= List of members of the Chamber of Deputies (Syria), 1943–1947 =

This is a list of deputies elected to the 3rd Chamber of Deputies, following the 1943 parliamentary election.

== Deputies ==
No.	Electoral district		Name	Religious affiliation	Party
1	Damascus and suburbs		Shukri al-Quwatli	Sunni Muslim	National Bloc
2	Damascus and suburbs		Said al-Ghazzi	Sunni Muslim	National Bloc
3	Damascus and suburbs		Nasuhi al-Bukhari	Sunni Muslim	Independent
4	Damascus and suburbs		Lutfi al-Haffar	Sunni Muslim	National Bloc
5	Damascus and suburbs		Jamil Mardam Bey	Sunni Muslim	National Bloc
6	Damascus and suburbs		Sabri al-Asali	Sunni Muslim	National Bloc
7	Damascus and suburbs		Abd al-Hamid al-Tabba	Sunni Muslim	
8	Damascus and suburbs		Khalid al-Azm	Sunni Muslim	Independent
9	Damascus and suburbs		Nasib al-Bakri	Sunni Muslim	National Bloc
10	Damascus and suburbs		Najib al-Rayyes	Sunni Muslim	National Bloc
11	Damascus and suburbs		Ahmad al-Sharabati	Sunni Muslim	National Bloc
12	Damascus and suburbs		Afif al-Sulh	Sunni Muslim	National Bloc
13	Damascus and suburbs		Nazrit Yaaqubian	Armenian Orthodox	
14	Damascus and suburbs		Na'im al-Antaki	Greek Orthodox	National Bloc
15	Damascus and suburbs		George Sahnawi	Roman Catholic	
16	Damascus and suburbs		Fares al-Khoury	Not represented minorities	National Bloc
17	Qalamoun		Abd al-Hakim al-Daas	Sunni Muslim	
18	Qalamoun		Mustafa Abd al-Mawla	Sunni Muslim	
19	Douma		Wadi al-Shishakli	Sunni Muslim	
20	Douma		Ali Dibu	Sunni Muslim	
21	Douma		Nasib al-Kilani	Sunni Muslim	
22	Wadi al-Ajam		Ahmad Awda	Sunni Muslim	
23	Golan		Faour al-Faour	Sunni Muslim	Independent
24	Golan		Izz al-Din Suleiman	Sunni Muslim	
25	Al-Zabadani		Jamil al-Shammat	Sunni Muslim	
26	Homs and suburbs		Mazhar Raslan	Sunni Muslim	National Bloc
27	Homs and suburbs		Adnan al-Atassi	Sunni Muslim	National Bloc
28	Homs and suburbs		Hilmi al-Atassi	Sunni Muslim	National Bloc
29	Homs and suburbs		Hani al-Sibai	Sunni Muslim	National Bloc
30	Homs and suburbs		Isa al-Yunis	Alawite Muslim	
31	Homs and suburbs		Abdullah Farkouh	Greek Orthodox	
32	Hama and suburbs		Ghalib al-Azm	Sunni Muslim	
33	Hama and suburbs		Najib al-Barazi	Sunni Muslim	National Bloc
34	Hama and suburbs		Raif al-Malqi	Sunni Muslim	National Bloc
35	Hama and suburbs		Akram al-Hourani	Sunni Muslim	Youth Party
36	Hama and suburbs		Farid Marhaj	Greek Orthodox	
37	Salamiyah		Emir Suleiman al-Ali	Ismaili Muslim	
38	Daraa		Muhammad al-Muflih al-Zoubi	Sunni Muslim	Independent
39	Daraa		Muzeid al-Mahamid	Sunni Muslim	
40	Izraa		Muhammad Khayr al-Hariri	Sunni Muslim	National Bloc
41	Izraa		Ahmad Faris al-Zoubi	Sunni Muslim	
42	Izraa		Ahmad al-Hussein	Sunni Muslim	
43	Aleppo City		Saadallah al-Jabiri	Sunni Muslim	National Bloc
44	Aleppo City		Abd al-Rahman al-Kayyali	Sunni Muslim	National Bloc
45	Aleppo City		Rushdi al-Kikhya	Sunni Muslim	National Bloc
46	Aleppo City		Nazim al-Qudsi	Sunni Muslim	National Bloc
47	Aleppo City		Wahbi al-Hariri	Sunni Muslim	Independent
48	Aleppo City		Ahmad Khalil al-Mudarris	Sunni Muslim	
49	Aleppo City		Sami Saim al-Dahr	Sunni Muslim	
50	Aleppo City		Ali al-Hayyani	Sunni Muslim	
51	Aleppo City		Moses Slatian	Armenian Orthodox	
52	Aleppo City		Hrag Papazian	Armenian Orthodox	
53	Aleppo City		Joseph Ilyan	Roman Catholic	National Bloc
54	Aleppo City		Mikhail Ilyan	Greek Orthodox	National Bloc
55	Aleppo City		Fathallah Asyun	Armenian Catholic	National Bloc
56	Aleppo City		Latif Ghanima	Syriac Catholics	National Bloc
57	Aleppo City		Azra Azraq	Jewish	
58	Aleppo City		Michel Rafi	Not represented minorities	
59	Mount Simeon		Hamki Muhammad al-Hamki	Sunni Muslim	
60	Mount Simeon		Muhammad Mahmoud al-Barakat	Sunni Muslim	National Bloc
61	Mount Simeon		Ali al-Yakan	Sunni Muslim	
62	Al-Bab		Abd al-Qadir Rahmu	Sunni Muslim	
63	Al-Bab		Muhammad al-Hajj Said Sukkar	Sunni Muslim	
64	Idlib		Hikmat al-Hakim	Sunni Muslim	National Bloc
65	Idlib		Wahid al-Dweidari	Sunni Muslim	
66	Idlib		Sadiq al-Muallim	Sunni Muslim	
67	Harem		Abd al-Qadir Barmada	Sunni Muslim	Independent
68	Manbij		Muhammad al-Ghanim	Sunni Muslim	
69	Manbij		Ibrahim al-Hasan al-Rabi	Sunni Muslim	
70	Jarabulus		Muhammad al-Uways	Sunni Muslim	
71	Maarat al-Numan		Hikmat al-Hiraki	Sunni Muslim	Independent
72	Azaz		Jamil Baqi	Sunni Muslim	
73	Azaz		Abd al-Rahman al-Hafiz	Sunni Muslim	
74	Jabal al-Akrad		Muhammad Ismail Zadeh	Sunni Muslim	
75	Jabal al-Akrad		Faiq Manan Ismail Zadeh	Sunni Muslim	
76	Jisr ash-Shughur		Najdat al-Najjari	Sunni Muslim	National Bloc
77	Ayn al-Arab		Mustafa Shahin	Sunni Muslim	
78	Deir ez-Zor and suburbs		Muhammad al-Ayish	Sunni Muslim	Independent
79	Deir ez-Zor and suburbs		Qasim al-Hunaydi	Sunni Muslim	
80	Deir ez-Zor and suburbs		Raghib al-Bashir	Sunni Muslim	
81	Raqqa		Hamid al-Khoja	Sunni Muslim	National Bloc
82	Raqqa		Barakat al-Ahmed al-Faraj	Sunni Muslim	
83	Raqqa		Muhammad Mujhim al-Bashir	Sunni Muslim	
84	Mayadin		Abboud al-Jadaan	Sunni Muslim	Independent
85	Mayadin		Turki al-Najras	Sunni Muslim	National Bloc
86	Abu Kamal		Uthman al-Muri	Sunni Muslim	
87	Al-Hasakah		Khalil Ibrahim Pasha	Sunni Muslim	
88	Al-Hasakah		Ali al-Zawba	Sunni Muslim	
89	Qamishli		Abd al-Baqi Nizam ad-Din	Sunni Muslim	National Bloc
90	Qamishli		Hasan Hajo	Sunni Muslim	
91	Qamishli		Said Muhammad	Sunni Muslim	
92	Qamishli		Said Ishaq	Syriac Orthodox	
93	Tigris		Abd al-Karim Mulla Sadiq	Sunni Muslim	
94	Suwayda		Hasan al-Atrash	Druze Muslim	Independent
95	Suwayda		Youssef al-Atrash	Druze Muslim	
96	Suwayda		Uqla al-Qutami	Minorities	
97	Suwayda		Saud al-Fawwaz	Tribes of Jabal al-Druze	
98	Salkhad		Ali Mustafa al-Atrash	Druze Muslim	
99	Shahba		Hasan Amir	Druze Muslim	
100	Latakia		Ali Saad Harun	Sunni Muslim	
101	Latakia		Muhammad Suleiman al-Ahmad	Alawite Muslim	National Bloc
102	Latakia		Wadi Saadeh	Greek Orthodox	
103	Al-Haffah		Nuri al-Haji	Sunni Muslim	
104	Al-Haffah		Salman al-Murshid	Alawite Muslim	
105	Jableh		Jamal Ali Adib	Alawite Muslim	National Bloc
106	Jableh		Ali Asad Ismail	Alawite Muslim	
107	Jableh		Bahjat Nassur	Alawite Muslim	
108	Baniyas		Ibrahim Salih Nasir	Alawite Muslim	
109	Masyaf		Muhammad Junayd	Sunni Muslim	
110	Tartus		Riyad Abd al-Razzaq	Sunni Muslim	National Bloc
111	Tartus		Hamed al-Mahmoud al-Hamed	Alawite Muslim	
112	Safita		Munir al-Abbas	Alawite Muslim	Independent
113	Safita		Youssef al-Hamed	Alawite Muslim	
114	Talkalakh		Said Darwish	Alawite Muslim	
115	Talkalakh		Ilyas Ubayd	Greek Orthodox	
116	Bedouin nomadic tribes	Damascus desert	Fawaz al-Shaalan	Sunni Muslim	
117	Bedouin nomadic tribes	Damascus desert	Tarrad al-Milhim	Sunni Muslim	
118	Bedouin nomadic tribes	Aleppo Desert	Nawwaf al-Salih	Sunni Muslim	
119	Bedouin nomadic tribes	Aleppo Desert	Shaish Abd al-Karim	Sunni Muslim	
120	Bedouin nomadic tribes	Tadmur desert	Rakan al-Murshid	Sunni Muslim	
121	Bedouin nomadic tribes	Deir ez-Zor desert	Mujhim bin Miheid	Sunni Muslim	
122	Bedouin nomadic tribes	Deir ez-Zor desert	Abd al-Aziz Kumayshish	Sunni Muslim	
123	Bedouin nomadic tribes	Jazira desert	Dahham al-Hadi	Sunni Muslim	
124	Bedouin nomadic tribes	Jazira desert	Mayzar Abd al-Muhsin	Sunni Muslim	

== By-elections ==
At the dissolution of the Chamber of Deputies in 1947, there were two vacancies: one in the Homs and suburbs electoral district, caused by the resignation of National Bloc member Mukarram al-Atassi, and one in the Damascus and suburbs electoral district, caused by the resignation of National Bloc member Afif al-Sulh. Given the proximity of the 1947 parliamentary election, by-elections were not called for these seats.

Electoral district	Date	Previous incumbent	Party	Winner	Party	Cause
Damascus and suburbs	Between 17 August and 19 October 1943	Shukri al-Quwatli	National Bloc	Fakhri al-Baroudi	National Bloc	Resigned after being elected President of the Republic on 18 August 1943.
Bedouin tribes (Damascus desert)	April 1946	Tarrad al-Milhim		Tamer al-Milhim		Death.
Homs and suburbs	16 or 17 October 1946	Hilmi al-Atassi	National Bloc	Mukarram al-Atassi	National Bloc	Hilmi al-Atassi died on 26 August 1946, in a plane crash.
Aleppo	23 or 24 October 1946	Michel Rafi		Dikran Jerejian	National Bloc	
