= List of members of the Chamber of Deputies (Syria), 1947–1949 =

This is a list of deputies elected to the 4th Chamber of Deputies, following the 1947 parliamentary election.

== Deputies ==
No.	Electoral district		Name	Religious affiliation	Party
1	Damascus – Centre and Suburbs		Jamil Mardam Bey	Muslim	Independent
2	Damascus – Centre and Suburbs		Zaki al-Khatib	Muslim	Independent
3	Damascus – Centre and Suburbs		Sami Kabbarah	Muslim	Independent
4	Damascus – Centre and Suburbs		Said al-Ghazzi	Muslim	Independent
5	Damascus – Centre and Suburbs		Muhammad Aqbiq	Muslim	
6	Damascus – Centre and Suburbs		Muhammad al-Mubarak	Muslim	Muslim Brotherhood
7	Damascus – Centre and Suburbs		Munir al-Ajlani	Muslim	Independent
8	Damascus – Centre and Suburbs		Nuri al-Ibish	Muslim	
9	Damascus – Centre and Suburbs		Nuri al-Hakim	Muslim	
10	Damascus – Centre and Suburbs		Ahmad al-Sharabati	Muslim	Independent
11	Damascus – Centre and Suburbs		Sabri al-Asali	Muslim	National Party
12	Damascus – Centre and Suburbs		Lutfi al-Haffar	Muslim	National Party
13	Damascus – Centre and Suburbs		Nasib al-Bakri	Muslim	People's Party
14	Damascus – Centre and Suburbs		Habib Kahala	Greek Orthodox	
15	Damascus – Centre and Suburbs		George Sahnawi	Roman Catholic	
16	Damascus – Centre and Suburbs		Farid Arslanian	Armenian Orthodox	
17	Damascus – Centre and Suburbs		Fares al-Khoury	Not represented minorities	People's Party
18	Damascus – Centre and Suburbs		Wahid Mizrahi	Jewish	
19	Douma		Fakhri al-Baroudi	Muslim	Independent
20	Douma		Farzat al-Mamluk	Muslim	
21	Douma		Younes al-Khanshour	Muslim	
22	Qalamoun		Ibrahim Tayfur	Muslim	
23	Qalamoun		Abd al-Salam Haydar	Muslim	
24	Al-Qutayfah		Muhammad Mahmoud Diab	Muslim	
25	Al-Zabadani		Faisal al-Asali	Muslim	Socialist Cooperation Party
26	Golan		Adil Arslan	Muslim	Independent
27	Golan		Faour al-Faour	Muslim	Independent
28	Wadi al-Ajam		Adil al-Ajlani	Muslim	
29	Wadi al-Ajam		Kamal al-Kinj	Druze Muslim	
30	Homs and suburbs		Hani al-Sibai	Muslim	People's Party
31	Homs and suburbs		Adnan al-Atassi	Muslim	People's Party
32	Homs and suburbs		Farhan al-Jandali	Muslim	People's Party
33	Homs and suburbs		Faydi al-Atassi	Muslim	People's Party
34	Homs and suburbs		Mahmoud Suwaydan	Muslim	
35	Homs and suburbs		Musallam al-Haddad	Greek Orthodox	People's Party
36	Homs and suburbs		Isa al-Siryani	Syriac Orthodox	People's Party
37	Homs and suburbs		Isa al-Yunis	Alawite Muslim	
38	Hama and suburbs		Akram al-Hourani	Muslim	Youth Party
39	Hama and suburbs		Abd al-Rahman al-Azm	Muslim	Independent
40	Hama and suburbs		Muhammad al-Sarraj	Muslim	People's Party
41	Hama and suburbs		Mahmoud al-Shaqfa	Muslim	
42	Hama and suburbs		Adib Nasur	Greek Orthodox	
43	Salamiyah		Suleiman al-Ali	Ismaili Muslim	
44	Daraa		Muhammad al-Muflih al-Zoubi	Muslim	Independent
45	Daraa		Mustafa al-Dukhan	Muslim	
46	Izraa		Muhammad Khayr al-Hariri	Muslim	National Party
47	Izraa		Muhammad Youssef Abu Rumiyyah	Muslim	
48	Al-Zawiya		Ahmad al-Hussein	Muslim	
49	Deir ez-Zor		Tawfiq al-Hunaydi	Muslim	
50	Deir ez-Zor		Raghib al-Bashir	Muslim	
51	Deir ez-Zor		Muhammad al-Ayish	Muslim	Independent
52	Deir ez-Zor		Muhammad Nuri al-Futayh	Muslim	
53	Mayadin		Salih al-Hureib	Muslim	
54	Mayadin		Abboud al-Jadaan	Muslim	Independent
55	Raqqa		Khalaf al-Hassan	Muslim	
56	Raqqa		Rashid al-Uwayd	Muslim	
57	Raqqa		Shawakh al-Ahmad al-Bursan	Muslim	
58	Raqqa		Abdul-Salam al-Ujeili	Muslim	
59	Abu Kamal		Uthman al-Muri	Muslim	
60	Al-Hasakah		Abd al-Aziz al-Maslat	Muslim	
61	Al-Hasakah		Lutfi al-Hajj Hussein	Muslim	
62	Qamishli		Hasan Hajo	Muslim	
63	Qamishli		Abd al-Baqi Nizam ad-Din	Muslim	People's Party
64	Qamishli		Abd al-Razzaq al-Hasu	Muslim	Independent
65	Qamishli		Ilyas Najjar	Syriac Orthodox	
66	Tigris		Abd al-Karim Mulla Sadiq	Muslim	
67	Aleppo City		Rushdi al-Kikhya	Muslim	People's Party
68	Aleppo City		Abdul-Wahab Hawmad	Muslim	People's Party
69	Aleppo City		Mustafa Barmada	Muslim	People's Party
70	Aleppo City		Nazim al-Qudsi	Muslim	People's Party
71	Aleppo City		Ahmad al-Rifai	Muslim	Independent
72	Aleppo City		Ahmad Qanbar	Muslim	People's Party
73	Aleppo City		Maarouf al-Dawalibi	Muslim	People's Party
74	Aleppo City		Wahbi al-Hariri	Muslim	Independent
75	Aleppo City		Joseph Ilyan	Roman Catholic	People's Party
76	Aleppo City		Rizqallah al-Antaki	Greek Orthodox	People's Party
77	Aleppo City		Abdullah Fattal	Armenian Orthodox	People's Party
78	Aleppo City		Latif Ghanima	Syriac Catholics	People's Party
79	Aleppo City		Louis Handiyeh	Armenian Catholic	
80	Aleppo City		Jibrayil Ghazal	Maronites	People's Party
81	Aleppo City		Dikran Jerejian	Not represented minorities	People's Party
82	Mount Simeon		Hamki Muhammad al-Hamki	Muslim	
83	Mount Simeon		Abd al-Aziz Hallaj	Muslim	People's Party
84	Mount Simeon		Muhammad al-Aswad	Muslim	People's Party
85	Mount Simeon		Muhammad Mahmoud al-Barakat	Muslim	People's Party
86	Idlib		Hikmat al-Hakim	Muslim	Independent
87	Idlib		Abd al-Hamid al-Dweidari	Muslim	People's Party
88	Idlib		Ghalib al-Ayyashi	Muslim	
89	Maarat al-Numan		Hikmat al-Hiraki	Muslim	Independent
90	Jisr ash-Shughur		Najdat al-Najjari	Muslim	National Party
91	Azaz		Anwar Ibrahim Qater	Muslim	
92	Azaz		Hasan al-Jabiri	Muslim	
93	Jabal al-Akrad		Khalil Sidu Mimi	Muslim	
94	Jabal al-Akrad		Aref al-Ghubari	Muslim	
95	Al-Bab		Asaad al-Darwish	Muslim	
96	Al-Bab		Abd al-Qadir Rahmu	Muslim	
97	Manbij		Abd al-Rahman al-Saegh	Muslim	
98	Manbij		Muhammad al-Ghanim	Muslim	
99	Jarabulus		Zaki al-Mudarris	Muslim	
100	Harem		Abd al-Qadir Barmada	Muslim	Independent
101	Harem		Rashad Barmada	Muslim	People's Party
102	Ayn al-Arab		Bozan Shahin	Muslim	
103	Ayn al-Arab		Mustafa Shahin	Muslim	
104	Latakia and its district		Asaad Harun	Muslim	National Party
105	Latakia and its district		Nadim Shuman	Muslim	
106	Latakia and its district		Muhammad Suleiman al-Ahmad	Alawite Muslim	National Party
107	Jableh		Jamal Ali Adib	Muslim	National Party
108	Jableh		Uthman Hasan Esber	Alawite Muslim	People's Party
109	Jableh		Aziz al-Kinj	Alawite Muslim	
110	Baniyas		Ibrahim Nasir al-Hakim	Alawite Muslim	
111	Tartus		Riyad Abd al-Razzaq	Muslim	National Party
112	Tartus		Anis Muhammad Ismail	Alawite Muslim	
113	Talkalakh		Muhammad Said Darwish Bilal	Alawite Muslim	
114	Talkalakh		Khalil al-Daas al-Jurjis	Greek Orthodox	
115	Safita		Ali Mulhim Raslan	Alawite Muslim	
116	Safita		Munir al-Abbas	Muslim	Independent
117	Safita		Shafiq Baytar	Orthodox	
118	Al-Haffah		Nuri Bazidu	Muslim	
119	Al-Haffah		Ahmad Ali Kamil	Alawite Muslim	Independent
120	Masyaf		Jihad al-Hawwash	Muslim	
121	Masyaf		Muhammad Junayd	Muslim	
122	Bedouin nomadic tribes	Syrian Desert	Fawaz al-Shaalan	Muslim	
123	Bedouin nomadic tribes	Syrian Desert	Tamer al-Milhim	Muslim	
124	Bedouin nomadic tribes	Jabal al-Druze tribes	Hayil al-Surur	Muslim	
125	Bedouin nomadic tribes	Tadmur desert	Rakan al-Murshid	Muslim	
126	Bedouin nomadic tribes	Aleppo – al-Hadidiyin	Nawwaf al-Salih	Muslim	
127	Bedouin nomadic tribes	Aleppo – al-Mawali	Abd al-Ibrahim	Muslim	
128	Bedouin nomadic tribes	Deir ez-Zor desert	Mujhim bin Miheid	Muslim	
129	Bedouin nomadic tribes	Deir ez-Zor desert	Abd al-Aziz Kuayshish	Muslim	
130	Bedouin nomadic tribes	Jazira	Munir Abd al-Muhsin	Muslim	
131	Bedouin nomadic tribes	Jazira	Dahham al-Hadi	Muslim	
Jabal al-Druze Governorate (Note: Due to unrest in Jabal al-Druze Governorate, elections there were repeatedly postponed, eventually being held on 4 January 1949.)
132	Suwayda		Jamil Abu Asali	Druze Muslim	
133	Suwayda		Daoud Hunaidi	Druze Muslim	
134	Suwayda		Uqla al-Qutami	Christian	
135	Salkhad		Hussein al-Shufi	Druze Muslim	
136	Shahba		Hamad Azzam	Druze Muslim	

== By-elections ==
Electoral district	Date	Previous incumbent	Party	Winner	Party	Cause
Bedouin nomadic tribes (Aleppo – al-Hadidiyin)	3 January 1949	Nawwaf al-Salih		Faisal Nawwaf al-Salih		Death.
