= List of members of the Chamber of Deputies (Syria), 1953–1954 =

This is a list of deputies elected to the 6th Chamber of Deputies, following the 1953 parliamentary election.

== Deputies ==
No.	Electoral district	Name	Party
1	Damascus	Munir Shura	Arab Liberation Movement
2	Damascus	Nuri al-Hakim	
3	Damascus	Muhyi al-Din Baqla	
4	Damascus	Hussein Kamal Hamza	
5	Damascus	Munir al-Habl	
6	Damascus	Maamun al-Kuzbari	Independent
7	Damascus	Fawzi al-Mufti	
8	Damascus	Faiz al-Ustaz	
9	Damascus	Youssef Jubran Lous	
10	Douma	Muhammad al-Jarrah	
11	Douma	Muhyi al-Din al-Shishakli	
12	Al-Nabek	Abd al-Rahim Ghazal	
13	Al-Zabadani	Mahmoud al-Tall	
14	Quneitra	Abd al-Rahman Ayyub	
15	Qatana	Ahmad Ouda	
16	Aleppo	Hani al-Rayis	
17	Aleppo	Hikmat Maslati	
18	Aleppo	Nafi' Saaim al-Dahr	
19	Aleppo	Wajih al-Jabri	
20	Aleppo	Nafi' Mujib al-Qudsi	
21	Aleppo	Grigor Ablighatian	
22	Aleppo	Philip Husni	
23	Aleppo	Victor Korneli	
24	Mount Simeon	Aladdin Ibrahim Pasha	
25	Mount Simeon	Ata al-Niyal	
26	Maarat al-Numan	Ghalib Abd Allah Balanah	
27	Idlib	Fahmi al-Hakim	
28	Idlib	Hikmat Fanri	
29	Harem	Ashraf Kayyali	
30	Al-Bab	Ahmad Shukri	
31	Al-Bab	Rahmu al-Shihabi	
32	Manbij	Asaad Baha al-Din al-Rifai	
33	Jarabulus	Mustafa Munir Ghannam	
34	Ayn al-Arab	Saad al-Din al-Ghuri	
35	Azaz	Safwat Amin Yakan	
36	Afrin	Faiq Manan Ismail Zadeh	
37	Afrin	Ahmad Jaafar Ismail Zadeh	
38	Jisr ash-Shughur	Najdat al-Najjari	
39	Latakia	Tawfiq Raif Harun	
40	Latakia	Ali al-Shamlat	
41	Jableh	Zaki Muhanna	
42	Jableh	Ahmad al-Kinj	
43	Baniyas	Mahmoud Ahmad Habib	
44	Tartus	Badr Marqabi	
45	Safita	Ahmad Fouad al-Abbas	
46	Safita	Ibrahim al-Khoury	
47	Al-Haffah	Nadim Ismail	
48	Deir ez-Zor	Taha Haddad	
49	Deir ez-Zor	Abd al-Razzaq al-Ayish	
50	Deir ez-Zor	Tawfiq Hinaydi	
51	Raqqa	Faisal al-Huwaydi	Independent
52	Raqqa	Hamid al-Khoja	Independent
53	Mayadin	Abd al-Majid Mashwah	
54	Abu Kamal	Abd al-Halim al-Dibs	
55	Homs	Munib Raslan	
56	Homs	Makram al-Jandali	
57	Homs	Sami Tayyara	Arab Liberation Movement
58	Homs	Muhammad al-Droubi	
59	Homs	Philip Farkouh	
60	Talkalakh	Abd al-Karim Dabbah al-Dandashi	Arab Liberation Movement
61	Talkalakh	Anwar Ilyas Ubayd	
62	Hama	Abd al-Hasib Addi	
63	Hama	Aref Qiyasa	
64	Hama	Ghalib al-Shishakli	
65	Hama	Nazim Marhaj	
66	Masyaf	Jihad al-Hawwash	
67	Salamiyah	Ali Haydar	
68	Al-Hasakah	Abd al-Aziz Hasan	Independent
69	Al-Hasakah	Said Hawash Jamil al-Maslat	
70	Qamishli and Derik	Akram Hajo	
71	Qamishli and Derik	Zaki Nizam al-Din	
72	Qamishli and Derik	Said Ishaq	
73	Daraa and al-Zawiya	Ahmad Muhammad al-Aswad	
74	Daraa and al-Zawiya	Abd al-Latif al-Miqdad	Independent
75	Izraa	Yasin Muhammad al-Hariri	
76	Suwayda	Muhammad Salih Abu Asali	
77	Salkhad	Jadallah Ahmad al-Ismi	
78	Shahba	Hasan Amir	
79	Tribes of Damascus Governorate	Nayef al-Shaalan	
80	Tribes of Homs Governorate	Rakan al-Murshid	
81	Tribes of Deir ez-Zor Governorate	Nuri bin Miheid	
82	Tribes of Al-Hasakah Governorate	Dahham al-Hadi	
