= List of members of the 1928 Syrian Constituent Assembly =

This is a list of deputies elected to the Constituent Assembly, following the 1928 election.

== Deputies ==
No.	Electoral district	Name	Party
1	Damascus	Taj al-Din al-Hasani	Independent
2	Damascus	Fawzi al-Ghazzi	National Bloc
3	Damascus	Ihsan al-Sharif	National Bloc
4	Damascus	Fakhri al-Baroudi	National Bloc
5	Damascus	Lutfi al-Haffar	National Bloc
6	Damascus	Zaki al-Khatib	National Bloc
7	Damascus	Fayez al-Khoury	National Bloc
8	Damascus	Youssef Leniado	Independent
9	Damascus	Ahmad al-Lahham	National Bloc
10	Damascus	Said al-Ghazzi	National Bloc
11	Damascus	Nasib al-Bakri	National Bloc
12	Damascus	Abd al-Qadir al-Khatib	
13	Damascus	George Sahnawi	
14	Damascus	Fawzi al-Bakri	National Bloc
15	Homs	Hashim al-Atassi	National Bloc
16	Homs	Mazhar Raslan	National Bloc
17	Homs	Shukri al-Jundi	National Bloc
18	Homs	Asaad al-Naqri	National Bloc
19	Hama	Husni al-Barazi	
20	Hama	Abdul Qader al-Keilani	National Bloc
21	Hama	Sabri Farah	National Bloc
22	Hauran	Ismail al-Hariri	
23	Hauran	Fadil al-Muhamid	
24	Hauran	Faris al-Zoubi	
25	Al-Qaryatayn	Ahmad al-Fayyad	
26	Wadi al-Ajam	Subhi al-Husaybi	
27	Al-Zabadani	Jamil al-Shammat	
28	Al-Nabek	Muhammad Khayr Aqil	
29	Jayrud	Muhammad Mahmoud Diab	
30	Douma	Wadi al-Shishakli	
31	Douma	Ahmad al-Khatib	
32	Golan	Izz al-Din Suleiman	
33	Salamiyah	Emir Tamer	
34	Aleppo	Ibrahim Hananu	
35	Aleppo	Saadallah al-Jabiri	National Bloc
36	Aleppo	Abd al-Rahman al-Kayyali	National Bloc
37	Aleppo	Ahmad al-Rifai	National Bloc
38	Aleppo	Abd al-Qadir al-Sarmini	National Bloc
39	Aleppo	Fathallah Asyun	National Bloc
40	Aleppo	Niqula Khanji	National Bloc
41	Aleppo	Mehran Yuzantian	
42	Aleppo	George Azar	
43	Aleppo	Latif Ghanima	National Bloc
44	Mount Simeon	Arif al-Jazzar	
45	Mount Simeon	Jamil Ibrahim Pasha	
46	Manbij	Mahmoud Nadim	National Bloc
47	Jarabulus	Mustafa Shahin	
48	Al-Bab	Abd al-Qadir Rahmu	
49	Kurd Dagh	Rashid Ismail	
50	Maarat al-Numan	Hikmat al-Hiraki	
51	Harem	Najib Barmada	Independent
52	Jisr ash-Shughur	Zaki al-Najjari	
53	Idlib	Nuri al-Asfari	
54	Idlib	Fouad Abd al-Karim	
55	Tribes of the Syrian Desert	Nuri al-Shaalan	
56	Tribes of Aleppo	Nawwaf al-Salih	
57	Antioch	Muhammad Al Yahya	
58	Antioch	Mustafa Thurayya Moses	
59	Antioch	Izz al-Din al-Shalabi	
60	Deir ez-Zor	N/A	
61	Deir ez-Zor	N/A	
62	Raqqa	N/A	
63	Raqqa	N/A	
64	Mayadin	N/A	
65	Abu Kamal	N/A	
66	Hasakah, Qamishli, and Tigris	N/A	
67	Hasakah, Qamishli, and Tigris	N/A	
68	Tribes of Deir ez-Zor	N/A	
