= 1937 Syrian supplementary elections =

- 25 September – 11 December 1937

All 21 seats in Latakia and Jabal al-Druze governorates

Special parliamentary elections to the Syrian Chamber of Deputies were held in 1937 to fill seats for the new electoral districts in Latakia (including Tartus at the time) and Jabal al-Druze (Suwayda) governorates.

== Background ==
In early September 1920, following the establishment of the French Mandate in Syria, the French divided the territories of Syria into smaller statelets. The Alawite State and Jabal Druze State were among the newly-created states. In 1936 (becoming effective in 1937), the two statelets were incorporated into the Syrian Republic as the governorates of Latakia and Jabal al-Druze. The Syrian parliamentary elections were already held in 1936, and thus there was a need to held special parliamentary elections to elect the deputies of the two newly-incorporated governorates.

== Electoral system ==
Elections were conducted under the Syrian electoral system in force at the time, with deputies elected from territorial electoral districts. Suffrage was limited and indirect in practice, with voting heavily influenced by local notables, clan leaders, and French authorities. Electoral competition was generally weak, and in some cases seats were uncontested.

== Latakia Governorate ==
Elections in Latakia Governorate were held in 25 September and October 1937. The governorate was assigned 16 seats. The elected deputies were as follows:

Electoral district	Name	Religious affiliation	Party
Latakia	Abd al-Qadir Shreiteh	Sunni	
Latakia	Ali Shihab	Alawite	
Latakia	Fayez Elias	Not represented minorities	
Sahyun	Salman al-Murshid	Alawite	
Sahyun	Omar al-Bitar	Sunni	
Masyaf	Muhammad Junayd	Alawite	
Masyaf	Muhammad Suleiman al-Ahmad	Alawite	National Bloc
Masyaf	Muhammad Hassan Asber	Alawite	
Masyaf	Janem Khaddour	Alawite	
Tartus	Mahmoud Abd al-Razzaq	Sunni	
Tartus	Muhammad al-Ismail	Alawite	
Safita	Munir al-Abbas	Alawite	
Safita	Amin al-Raslan	Alawite	
Safita	Jabra al-Hilu	Greek Orthodox	
Talkalakh	Shawkat al-Abbas	Alawite	
Talkalakh	Elias Gerges	Greek Orthodox	

== Jabal al-Druze Governorate ==
Elections in Jabal al-Druze Governorate were held in 29 November and 11 December 1937. The governorate was assigned 5 seats.

== See also ==
- 1936 Syrian parliamentary election
- Alawite State
- Jabal Druze State
