= Idlib (former People's Assembly electoral district) =

Former electoral district of Syria's national legislature

- Former electoral district for the People's Assembly
- Location of Idlib within Syria
- Governorate: Idlib
- Population: 1,501,000 (2011)
- Area: 6,097 km^{2}

Former electoral district
- Created: 1973
- Abolished: 2025
- Seats: List: 18 (1990–2025); 14 (1977–1990); 12 (1973–1977)
- Created from: List: Harem; Idlib; Idlib City; Jisr ash-Shughur; Maarat al-Numan
- Replaced by: List: Ariha; Harem; Idlib; Jisr ash-Shughur; Khan Shaykhun; Maarat al-Numan

Idlib (Arabic: إدلب) was an electoral district used to elect members of the Syrian People's Assembly between 1973 and 2025.

== Electoral system ==
The electoral system used to elect the People's Assembly was introduced in 1973 and remained in use until the assembly's dissolution in 2025. Each governorate formed a single, large electoral district, except for Aleppo Governorate, which was divided into two districts: the city of Aleppo and the rural districts of Aleppo Governorate. Within each district, seats were awarded on a block-vote basis, with the candidates receiving the largest number of votes taking all of the seats allocated to it, and the assembly was composed of representatives of two sectors, "workers and peasants" and "other sectors of the people", with the former guaranteed at least half of its seats nationally. The number of seats, and their distribution among districts, was left to the president of the republic to set by decree rather than being fixed in law; the total was raised from 186 to 195 in 1981 and from 195 to 250 in 1990, after which the distribution among the fifteen electoral districts was not changed.

All Syrian citizens aged 18 and over were entitled to vote, other than those under legal guardianship, those with a mental illness affecting their legal capacity, and those convicted of a felony or a "dishonourable" misdemeanour, while serving members of the armed forces and police were barred from voting and from standing as candidates; candidates were further required to be at least 25 years old and to have held Syrian nationality for at least five years, a period raised to ten under the 2011 and 2014 electoral laws. During the 2011 reform of the electoral law, the replacement of this system was discussed because of its weak representativeness, but the large-district, block-vote system was retained; the reform instead moved the administration of elections from the Ministry of Interior and provincial governors to an independent Supreme Judicial Committee for Elections, a structure carried over into a further law passed in 2014 that consolidated the rules for presidential, parliamentary and local-council elections into a single statute.

Beyond being considered unrepresentative — a majoritarian, large-district system of a kind rejected by most electoral systems worldwide — the system has also been criticised for the unevenness of its distribution of seats between governorates. Based on the number of registered voters at the 2012 election, the average was around 59,000 voters per seat nationally, but the ratio varied considerably: about 37,800 voters per seat in Damascus and 51,500 in Tartus, compared with 71,700 in Al-Hasakah and 69,500 in the rural districts of Aleppo Governorate, with no mechanism beyond a presidential decree governing the size of constituencies or the allocation of seats between them.

== Members ==
Elections	MPA (Party)	MPA (Party)	MPA (Party)	MPA (Party)	MPA (Party)	MPA (Party)	MPA (Party)	MPA (Party)	MPA (Party)	MPA (Party)	MPA (Party)	MPA (Party)	MPA (Party)	MPA (Party)	MPA (Party)	MPA (Party)	MPA (Party)	MPA (Party)
1973	Khalid al-Khader (N/A)	Nur al-Din Najm (N/A)	Muhammad Haj Hamud (N/A)	Muhammad Abd al-Rahman Anis (N/A)	Abd al-Karim al-Hilal (N/A)	Muhammad Salah al-Din Hawwa (N/A)	Abd al-Muti Abd al-Qadir (N/A)	Muhammad Istanbuli (N/A)	Fahmi al-Youssefi (N/A)	Adil Hussein (N/A)	Abd al-Aziz Diab (N/A)	Muhammad Nadhir Dweidri (N/A)	Muhammad Riyad Majni (N/A)	13 seats				
1977	Khalid al-Khader (N/A)	Ahmad al-Hajj Youssef (N/A)	Muhammad Kharboutli (N/A)	Muhammad Haj Ayyoub (N/A)	Nasr al-Yousef (N/A)	Ahmad Eid al-Ahmad (N/A)	Abd al-Muti Abd al-Qadir (N/A)	Muhammad Istanbuli (N/A)	Muhammad Latouf (N/A)	Ismail al-Yousefi (N/A)	Abd al-Aziz Diab (N/A)	Muhammad Nadhir Dweidri (N/A)	Muhammad Hisham Saifo (N/A)	Ala al-Din Hamama (N/A)	14 seats			
1981	Khalid al-Khader (N/A)	Mustafa al-Yousefi (N/A)	Muhammad Saleh Hajo (N/A)	Omar al-Rai (N/A)	Mahmoud Haj Ahmad (N/A)	Mustafa Latouf (N/A)	Tawfiq al-Ibrahim (N/A)	Mahdi Janem (N/A)	Munir Qatini (N/A)	Muhammad Shakib al-Taha (N/A)	Karim Sheikh Karim (N/A)	Muhammad Nadhir Dweidri (N/A)	Muhammad Kamal Hammadi (N/A)	Mustafa Sayyid Ahmad (N/A)	14 seats			
1986	Khalid al-Khader (N/A)	Ahmad Fawzi Hamidan (N/A)	Ikram al-Yousefi (N/A)	Omar al-Rai (N/A)	Mahmoud Haj Ahmad (N/A)	Mustafa Alloush (N/A)	Tawfiq al-Ibrahim (N/A)	Mahdi Janem (N/A)	Munir Qatini (N/A)	Muhammad Shakib al-Taha (N/A)	Karim Sheikh Karim (N/A)	Muhammad Nadhir Dweidri (N/A)	Abd al-Karim Manna (N/A)	Muhammad Naffakh (N/A)	14 seats			
1990	Khalid al-Khader (N/A)	Abd al-Razzaq al-Tanari (N/A)	Muhammad Fran (N/A)	Bashira Hamed (N/A)	Mahmoud Haj Ahmad (N/A)	Nahida Qassas (N/A)	Tawfiq al-Ibrahim (N/A)	Ahmad Salem (N/A)	Muhammad al-Sayyid (N/A)	Walid Sardini (N/A)	Muhammad Abd al-Rahman (N/A)	Muhammad Nadhir Dweidri (N/A)	Ahmad al-Gharib (N/A)	Ahmad Riyad (N/A)	Muhammad Nihad Mishantat (N/A)	Muhammad Latouf (N/A)	Riyad Naasan Agha (N/A)	Muhammad al-Abdallah (N/A)
1994	Khalid al-Khader (N/A)	Jamil Latta (N/A)	Abd al-Razzaq al-Hamou (N/A)	Bashira Hamed (N/A)	Mahmoud Haj Ahmad (N/A)	Muhammad Majid al-Ramadan (N/A)	Omar Hassani (N/A)	Abd al-Latif Shakir (N/A)	Muhammad Osama Halabi (N/A)	Khalidiya Kabtawi (N/A)	Nasr al-Yousef (N/A)	Muhammad Nadhir Dweidri (N/A)	Muhammad Rahhal (N/A)	Rifat Daqqa (N/A)	Muhammad Nihad Mishantat (N/A)	Muhammad Latouf (N/A)	N/A	N/A
1995 by-election	Khalid al-Khader (N/A)	Jamil Latta (N/A)	Abd al-Razzaq al-Hamou (N/A)	Bashira Hamed (N/A)	Mahmoud Haj Ahmad (N/A)	Muhammad Adib Najm (N/A)	Omar Hassani (N/A)	Abd al-Latif Shakir (N/A)	Muhammad Osama Halabi (N/A)	Khalidiya Kabtawi (N/A)	Nasr al-Yousef (N/A)	Muhammad Nadhir Dweidri (N/A)	Muhammad Rahhal (N/A)	Rifat Daqqa (N/A)	Muhammad Nihad Mishantat (N/A)	Muhammad Latouf (N/A)	N/A	N/A
1996 by-election	Khalid al-Khader (N/A)	Jamil Latta (N/A)	Abd al-Razzaq al-Hamou (N/A)	Bashira Hamed (N/A)	Mahmoud Haj Ahmad (N/A)	Muhammad Fuad Najm (N/A)	Omar Hassani (N/A)	Abd al-Latif Shakir (N/A)	Muhammad Osama Halabi (N/A)	Khalidiya Kabtawi (N/A)	Nasr al-Yousef (N/A)	Muhammad Nadhir Dweidri (N/A)	Muhammad Rahhal (N/A)	Rifat Daqqa (N/A)	Muhammad Nihad Mishantat (N/A)	Muhammad Latouf (N/A)	N/A	N/A
1998	Ali Hamdoun (N/A)	Nadia Hashem (N/A)	Ahmad Taleb (N/A)	Muhammad Soufi (N/A)	Hikmat Khattab (N/A)	Malek Awad (N/A)	Saeed Aliko (N/A)	Majd al-Din Issa (N/A)	Nafidha Nibal al-Muallem (N/A)	Abd al-Aziz al-Yousef (N/A)	Nasr al-Yousef (N/A)	Muhammad al-Omar (N/A)	Walid Abdallah (N/A)	Adnan Makhzoumi (N/A)	Muhammad Nihad Mishantat (N/A)	Ahmad Shafi Kayyali (Ba'ath)	Muhammad Jawish (N/A)	Najdat al-Yousef (N/A)
2003	Marwan al-Najm (N/A)	Abbas al-Faris (N/A)	Huda Hijazi (Ba'ath)	Sobhi al-Abdallah (Ba'ath)	Abd al-Qadir Hanas (N/A)	Ahmad Yousfi (N/A)	Ahmad al-Mubarak (Ba'ath)	Ihsan Mohsen (N/A)	Nafidha Nibal al-Muallem (N/A)	Abd al-Razzaq al-Yousef (Ind.)	Salah al-Din Ali al-Sheikh (N/A)	Safwan Qarbi (Ba'ath)	Abd al-Nasser Hamidan (N/A)	Muhammad Jamal Ghazzal (N/A)	Muhammad Nihad Mishantat (N/A)	Ahmad Shafi Kayyali (Ba'ath)	Muhammad Akram al-Jundi (Ind.)	Abd al-Basit al-Hishoum (N/A)
2007	Muhammad Sharhouli (Ba'ath)	Sameer Baydoun (Ba'ath)	Huda Hijazi (Ba'ath)	Sobhi al-Abdallah (Ba'ath)	Muhammad Zaher al-Yousefi (SUP)	Iman Khan Sheikhouni (Ba'ath)	Ahmad al-Mubarak (Ba'ath)	Ibrahim Haj Abd al-Aziz (Ba'ath)	Muhammad Muti Mouayyad (Until 2012: SUP; From 2012: ASUP)	Abd al-Razzaq al-Yousef (Ind.)	Muhammad al-Omar (Ind.)	Safwan Qarbi (Ba'ath)	Sobhi Hamida (Ba'ath)	Muhammad Salim Zakour (Ba'ath)	Muhammad Haj Hamida Beitar (SUP)	Muhammad Zuhair al-Yousef (Ba'ath)	Muhammad Akram al-Jundi (Ind.)	Samer Habal (Ind.)
2012	Zakwan Asi (DSUO)	Ahmad al-Hilal (Ba'ath)	Ahmed al-Faraj (Ba'ath)	Sobhi al-Abdallah (Ba'ath)	Ghassan al-Qanatri (Ba'ath)	Ahmad Qabbani (Ba'ath)	Ahmad al-Mubarak (Ba'ath)	Abdo Alo (Ba'ath)	Muhammad Muti Mouayyad (Until 2012: SUP; From 2012: ASUP)	Fatima Khamis (Ba'ath)	Faisal al-Mahmoud (Ba'ath)	Safwan Qarbi (Ba'ath)	Nahed al-Moallem (Ba'ath)	Sawsan Sayed Wahba (SSNP)	Abdul Razzaq al-Qatini (Ba'ath)	Abd al-Wahid Razzouq (Ba'ath)	Muhammad Hussein al-Hussein (Ind.)	Muhammad Riad Hasri (Ind.)
2012 by-election	Zakwan Asi (DSUO)	Ahmad al-Hilal (Ba'ath)	Ahmed al-Faraj (Ba'ath)	Sobhi al-Abdallah (Ba'ath)	Muhammad Zaher al-Yousefi (Ba'ath)	Ahmad Qabbani (Ba'ath)	Ahmad al-Mubarak (Ba'ath)	Abdo Alo (Ba'ath)	Muhammad Muti Mouayyad (Until 2012: SUP; From 2012: ASUP)	Fatima Khamis (Ba'ath)	Faisal al-Mahmoud (Ba'ath)	Safwan Qarbi (Ba'ath)	Nahed al-Moallem (Ba'ath)	Sawsan Sayed Wahba (SSNP)	Abdul Razzaq al-Qatini (Ba'ath)	Abd al-Wahid Razzouq (Ba'ath)	Muhammad Hussein al-Hussein (Ind.)	Muhammad Riad Hasri (Ind.)
2015 by-election	Zakwan Asi (DSUO)	Ahmad al-Hilal (Ba'ath)	Ahmed al-Faraj (Ba'ath)	Sobhi al-Abdallah (Ba'ath)	Muhammad Zaher al-Yousefi (Ba'ath)	Ahmad Qabbani (Ba'ath)	Ahmad al-Mubarak (Ba'ath)	Khaled al-Daher (Ba'ath)	Muhammad Muti Mouayyad (Until 2012: SUP; From 2012: ASUP)	Fatima Khamis (Ba'ath)	Faisal al-Mahmoud (Ba'ath)	Safwan Qarbi (Ba'ath)	Nahed al-Moallem (Ba'ath)	Sawsan Sayed Wahba (SSNP)	Abdul Razzaq al-Qatini (Ba'ath)	Abd al-Wahid Razzouq (Ba'ath)	Muhammad Hussein al-Hussein (Ind.)	Muhammad Riad Hasri (Ind.)
2016	Sameer al-Ismail (Ba'ath)	Ahmad al-Hilal (Ba'ath)	Shireen al-Youssef (Ba'ath)	Ghiyath al-Qatini (Ba'ath)	Muhammad Zaher al-Yousefi (Ba'ath)	Ahmad Qabbani (Ba'ath)	Muhammad Tarek Daabol (Ba'ath)	Khaled al-Daher (Ba'ath)	Zakwan Assi (SUP)	Fatima Khamis (Ba'ath)	Faisal al-Mahmoud (Ba'ath)	Safwan Qarbi (Ba'ath)	Nidal Hamidi (Ind.)	Muhammad Talal Houri (SSNP)	Jamal Masto (Ba'ath)	Abd al-Wahid Razzouq (Ba'ath)	Muhammad Hussein al-Hussein (Ind.)	Yahya Awad (Ba'ath)
2020	Sameer al-Ismail (Ba'ath)	Abd al-Karim al-Youssef (Ba'ath)	Shireen al-Youssef (Ba'ath)	Ghiyath al-Qatini (Ba'ath)	Muhammad Kirdoush (Ba'ath)	Ahmad al-Faraj (Ba'ath)	Muhammad Qassem Hamadeh (Ba'ath)	Adel al-Shayban (Ba'ath)	Wael Dali (Ba'ath)	Fatima Khamis (Ba'ath)	Naasan Hijazi (NCP)	Safwan Qarbi (Ba'ath)	Ahmad Aqrin (Ind.)	Ahmad Bustaji (SCP-U)	Jamal Masto (Ba'ath)	Khaled Harbeh (Ba'ath)	Maamoun al-Sayyid (Ba'ath)	Fouad Aldani (Ind.)
2024	Ahmad al-Mubarak (Ba'ath)	Asaad Jawhar (Ba'ath)	Mayada Jabbour (Ba'ath)	Abdul-Fattah al-Najjar (Ba'ath)	Fadel Zankalou (Ba'ath)	Ahmad al-Faraj (Ba'ath)	Fawzia Manna (Ba'ath)	Khaled al-Daher (Ba'ath)	Bayan Sheikh (Ba'ath)	Iyad Yousef (Ba'ath)	Hassan al-Hassani (Ba'ath)	Ahmad Naffakh (Ba'ath)	Ahmad Aqrin (Ind.)	Muhammad al-Keshto (Ba'ath)	Jamal Masto (Ba'ath)	Abdul-Salam al-Ahmad (Ba'ath)	Ibrahim Atef Houri (SSNP)	Muhammad Hussein al-Hussein (Ind.)
