= Hiraki =

Hiraki (written: 開 or 平木) is a Japanese surname. Notable people with the surname include:

- Daisaku Hiraki (平木 大作, born 1974), Japanese politician
- Kenjiro Hiraki (開 健次郎, born 1940), Japanese sport wrestler
- Kokona Hiraki (開 心那, born 2008), Japanese skateboarder
- Rika Hiraki (平木 理化, born 1971), Japanese table tennis player
- Ryuzo Hiraki (平木 隆三, 1931–2009), Japanese footballer and manager
- Yoshiki Hiraki (平木 良樹, born 1986), Japanese footballer

== See also ==
- Hiraki Station, a railway station in Miyama, Fukuoka Prefecture, Japan
