= Abdul Qader al-Keilani =

Syrian nationalist, Islamic scholar, and statesman (1874–1948)

Member of the Ottoman Parliament for Homs and Hama
- In office 1908–1918

Deputy from Hama to the Syrian National Congress
- In office 1919 – 17 July 1920

Minister of Agriculture
- In office 1928–1931

Personal details
- Born: 1874 Aleppo, Syria
- Died: 1948 (aged 73–74)
- Occupation: Political leader and Islamic scholar

Abdul Qader Husni al-Keilani al-Hasani (1874–1948) (Arabic: عبدالقادر حسني الكيلاني) was a Syrian nationalist, statesman and religious authority.

== Lineage and early Life ==
Sayed Abdul Qader was born in Aleppo in 1874 to the prominent Keilani family. The family descends from a famous religious figure and greatest saint of his time, Sayyid Abdul Qader al-Jilani al-Hasani (1078–1166 AD), the father and founder of the Keilani Sufi order (also called Qaderiya) which still has thousands of followers all over the Islamic world today. The family first appeared in Hama more than 800 years ago when a certain ancestor, Sayed Sayf al-Deen Yehya al-Keilani (died 1334 AD), a direct descendant of Sayyid Abdul Qadir al-Jilani, decided to reside in the city in 1285 AD, permanently moving from his original birthplace of Baghdad. Sayed Sayf al-Deen built homes for his family, a lodge and a bridge over the Orontes river, this section of the city later became known as "al-Keilaniah district", attesting to the influence and rich historical depth of this family in the city of Hama. Soon after, the Keilanis became the leading family of the town, owing not only to the historical and religious significance of their ancestor but also to the fact that they belonged to the Ashraf class, the recognized descendants of the Islamic prophet Muhammad. As such, they held the post of naqib al-ashraf (the head of the Ashraf group), a prestigious Islamic post that had been officially reorganized by the central government of the Islamic Empire. This position was handed down through the generations within the Keilani family in Hama. Members of the family also succeeded in gaining access to other important offices, such as that of the Mufti (the highest jurisconsult), the Qadi (the supreme Islamic Judge), and of course, they held on to their traditional leadership of the Sufi Qaderiyah sect, which prospered to a great extent during the Ottoman era. These offices were the highest in any Ottoman city, and in fact, there were instances when several Keilanis were appointed to all these positions at the same time. Many scholars who identified with the Hanafi school of Fiqh were produced by the family. The family glory had reached a remarkable stage in the 17th and 19th century.

Abdul Qader's father had died while he was a young child, and so he was raised by his maternal grandfather, Sayed Mohammad Ali al-Keilani, the Mufti of the city. He was educated locally studying under the scholars of his time, and like most of his relatives and ancestors, he followed the path of religious scholarship.

== Career ==
In the early 20th century he was elected to the local government council, and shortly after he was appointed as Mayor of Hama. Keilani immediately worked on projects that served the city well, including widening roads and building bridges. In 1908 he was elected to the Parliament of the Ottoman Empire (Majles al-Maboothan) representing the two sister cities of Homs and Hama, with Sayed Abdul Hameed al-Ziharawi, a counterpart form Homs. The parliament convened in Istanbul, the capital of the Ottoman Empire. There, Keilani had the chance to befriend famous Arab leaders and thinkers, who later led the Arab independence movements. Important figures such as prince Shakeeb Arsalan and prince Prince Faisal al-Hashemi were among these personalities.

At the time of his return to his home town, Syria was undergoing major changes. In 1917 the Turks withdrew from the Arab land in face of the advancing Arabian troops of Prince Faisal al-Hashemi. Shortly after, in 1919 Keilani was elected to the Syrian National Congress, the first Syrian parliament, as a deputy from Hama. On March 10, 1920, this constitutional assembly drafted the first Syrian/Arab constitution.

Upon dissolving the Congress by the French in 1920, Keilani returned to his hometown and worked to weaken the French mandate. In 1925 he was one of the leaders of the Hama revolution in which many of his cousins and their retainers had taken part. In October 1927, Keilani was among of the 15 top Syrian/Lebanese figures who convened in Beirut to discuss the situation of the country. The famous National Bloc was born out of that convention and was headed by one of Keilani's dearest friends, Hashem al-Atassi. This political group was committed to a free democratic and independent Syria, and quickly became the only negotiator for the Syrian side in the struggle for independence. Keilani was elected for the second time to the national assembly in April 1928 as a deputy from Hama, winning on the ticket of the newly formed National Bloc.

In February 1928, Keilani was chosen by Sheikh Taj al-Din al-Hasani to head the ministry of agriculture and trade in his newly formed government. Keilani accepted the post as the only National Bloc member in that cabinet. Some speculated that this was a ploy to distance Keilani from Hama where he had a growing base of popularity and influence and bring him closer to Damascus under the eyes of the French. In December 1931 he resigned in face of increasing difficulties his department was facing. He returned to Hama. That same year he was invited to Jerusalem to participate in the Islamic conference that was led by Shareef Hussein. In this conference, an agreement was established on issues of Islamic and Arabic unity, independence from French and British influence, and the support for the Palestinian cause.

In addition to his political roles, he was an Islamic scholar who never ceased to teach and lead prayers in the local mosque (Ibrahim al-Keilani) in which his ancestors traditionally had preached and lead the local community. He briefly headed the Qaderiyah sect after the death of its leader Sayed Abdul-Jabbar Keilani, and was also elected to lead the committee that organized the well-known Hama Spring Celebrations. Keilani died in Hama in 1948 and was survived by his children and grandchildren.

== Sources ==
- Family accounts, especially Miss Razan Keilani.
- Khoury, Philip Syria And The French Mandate . Princeton University Press, 1987
- Rida, Ali Qissat al-Kifah al-Watani fi Sourya (The Story of the National Struggle in Syria) 1979
- Jumaa, Suaa Asaad and Zaza, Hasan al-Hukoomat al-Sooriyah fi al-Qarn al-Isheen (The Syrian Governments in the Twentieth Century) Dar Ikrima, 2001.
- Reilly, James. A Small Town in Syria Peter Lang, 2002.
- Al-Keilani, Abdul Razzaq al-Sheikh Abdul Qader al-Jeilani Dar al-Qalam, Damascus, 1994
