= Fawzi al-Ghazzi =

Syrian politician

Fawzi al-Ghazzi (1891–1929) (Arabic: فوزي الغزي), was a Syrian politician known for being the creator of the Syrian constitution. Ghazzi was born in Damascus, and fought for the Turkish during World War I. After the Arab revolt, al-Ghazzi was appointed secretary of the Interior Ministry for the Arab Government. He was a staunch opposer to the French mandate of Syria, and was exiled to the island of Arwad for this. He was elected to the Syrian Parliament in the 1928 election, and became the chairman of the Constituent Assembly, which wrote the first Syrian Constitution. The constitution was approved by the Syrian Parliament on July 4, 1928. He was poisoned by his wife for unknown reasons.
