= Al-Haffah (Chamber of Deputies electoral district) =

Former electoral district of Syria's national legislature

- Former electoral district for the Chamber of Deputies

Former electoral district
- Created: 1937
- Abolished: 1963
- Seats: List: 2 (1937–1953; 1954–1963); 1 (1953–1954)
- Replaced by: Latakia

Al-Haffah (Arabic: الحفة) was an electoral district used to elect members of the Syrian Chamber of Deputies between 1928 and 1963. Al-Haffah was, until 1936, part of Alawite State and thus didn't participate in earlier Syrian parliamentary elections. Following the Alawite State’s incorporation into Syria, the first elections in The electoral district were held in late 1937.

== Electoral system ==
Under the 1928 electoral system, Syria adopted its first formal electoral law after the Ottoman period and under the French Mandate. Promulgated by arrêté No. 1889 of High Commissioner Ponsot, the system created a two-tier indirect electoral system. Male citizens over the age of 21 would elect secondary electors, at a ratio of one elector per hundred first-tier voters, who would then elect members of parliament. The number of seats was determined before every election based on the proportional population size of each electoral district, with seats allocated across religious communities according to their numerical share. The system was criticised for entrenching the influence of local notables, elites, and landowners, with limited direct popular participation.

In 1947, the government of Jamil Mardam Bey introduced a new direct electoral system. The system was applied for the first time in the 1947 elections and was amended twice, in 1954 and 1961. It remained in force through the 1961 elections and until the fall of the Second Republic in 1963.

Until 1949, the electorate consisted of Syrian men aged 20 and over. Following Husni al-Za'im's seizure of power, the voting age was lowered to 18 and women were granted the right to vote. The subsequent Hashim al-Atassi government retained the lower voting age but restricted women's suffrage to literate women only, without the right to stand for election. It was not until the 1954 elections, held under the 1950 constitution, that women of all educational backgrounds were granted equal rights to vote and stand for office.

== Deputies ==
Elections	Deputy (Party)	Deputy (Party)
1937	Salman al-Murshid (N/A)	Omar al-Bitar (N/A)
1943	Salman al-Murshid (N/A)	Nuri al-Haji (N/A)
1947	Nuri Bazidu (N/A)	Ahmad Ali Kamil (Independent)
1949	Nuri al-Hajji (N/A)	Ahmad Ali Kamil (Independent)
1953	Nadim Ismail (N/A)	1 seat
1954 (Mar) (Note: The parliament elected in 1949 was restored in March 1954 after the regime of Adib Shishakli was overthrown. Deputies resumed their seats until the end of the term in July.)	Ahmad Ali Kamil (Independent)	Nuri al-Hajji (N/A)
1954 (Oct)	Aziz Abbad (N/A)	Nuri al-Hajji (N/A)
1961	Muhammad Ali Kamil (Independent)	Nadim Mustafa Ismail (Independent)
