= Hikmat al-Hiraki =

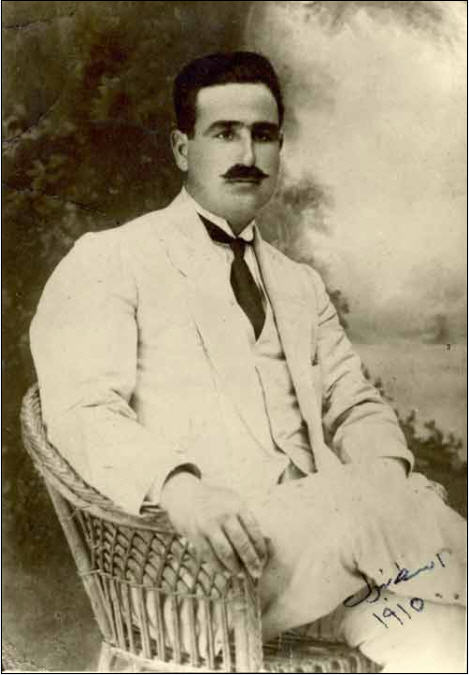
Hikmat Beik al-Hiraki, congressman and nationalist

Hikmat Beik al-Hiraki al-Husseini (1886–1969) (Arabic: حكمت بك الحراكي) was a Syrian nationalist, statesman and one of the original writers of the Syrian constitution.

Sayed Hikmat was born in Ma'arrat al-Numan in 1886 to the well-known notable Hiraki family. The family descends from a famous religious figure and pseudo-saint of his time, Sayed Abdullah al-Hiraki al-Husseini (died 1184 AD). Hikmat's father, Sayed Nawras Pasha al-Hiraki was a respected figure throughout the Syrian land who held the post of "Naqeeb al-Ashraf" of their home town. Naqeeb al-Ashraf was the head of the Ashraf class, descendants of the Islamic prophet Muhammad. This prestigious position was handed down through the generations within the Hiraki family in Ma'arrat al-Numan. Several scion of this family also held the post in the city of Homs.

Hiraki was educated locally and in Istanbul, the capital of the Ottoman Empire, where aristocratic Arab families typically sent their children for higher education. At the time of his return to his home town, Syria was undergoing major changes. In 1918 the Turks withdrew from the Arab land in face of the advancing Arabian troops of Prince Faisal al-Hashemi. Sami Beik al-Hiraki, the older brother of Hikmat Beik, was appointed district governor of Ma'arrat al-Numan by Prince Faisal. The two brothers received the Arabian troops and their leader, Nuri Pasha as-Said, at their home.

Shortly after, in 1919, Hiraki was elected to the Syrian National Congress, the first Syrian parliament, as a deputy from Ma'arrat al-Numan. On 10 March 1920 he was named one of the seven members of the constitutional committee that was charged with drafting the first Syrian constitution. Other members included Hashem al-Atassi, Wasfi al-Atassi, and Saadallah al-Jabiri. Within a few days, the members of this committee were able to review several existing constitutional documents form different countries, formulate a draft, debate the articles, and present the new constitution to the congress for ratification. The constitution declared Syria an independent constitutional monarchy under King Faisal al-Hashemi, and recognized no foreign claims in the country or international treaties that would jeopardize its independence. Hiraki had also inherited the post of "Naqeeb al-Ashraf" of Ma'arrat al-Numan from his ancestors.

Since the Syrian National Congress Hiraki was elected to most congressional assemblies throughout the 1920s, 1930s and 1940s, representing his home town. On 20 September 1941 the ministry of Supply was created. Hikmat al-Hiraki was installed as its first minister in the history of Syria in the cabinet of Hasan al-Hakim which lasted until 17 April 1942. Hiraki, however, outlasted the cabinet, and continued to serve as the minister of Public Works in the following two cabinets of Husni al-Barazi (ended on 8 January 1943), and then the cabinet of Jamil al-Ulshi (from 8 January to 15 March 1943).

Hiraki took part in struggle against the French. In 1945 he spent a great deal of his wealth to finance the uprising in the area of Hama and Ma'arrat al-Numan, in which many of his relatives had participated. He was famous for his generosity and hospitality. His house in Ma'arrat al-Numan was a famous bustling center in which national activists, leaders, politicians, and poets convened, and was even open for the poor and needy.

Hiraki died in 1969.
