= Abdul Qader Barmada =

Syrian politician

- عبدالقادر برمدا
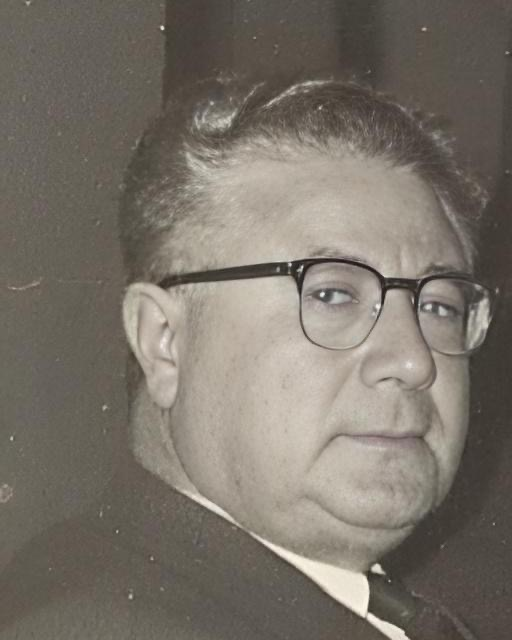
- Born: 1911; Harem, Syria, Ottoman Empire
- Died: December 18, 2000 (aged 88–89); Aleppo, Syria
- Citizenship: Syrian
- Occupation: Politician

Abdul Qader Barmada (Arabic: عبدالقادر برمدا; 1911 – 18 December 2000), was a Syrian agriculturalist and politician. He represented the Harem district in the Parliament of Syria and served as a member of parliament during the early years of Syrian independence. He was elected in 1943 and again in 1947. He was also involved in agricultural development and was one of the early Syrian agriculturalists to receive training in France. In 1963, following the Ba'athist coup, he was among former political figures placed under a ten-year period of civil isolation..
