= 1928 Syrian Constituent Assembly election =

- 10 April 1928 (first stage); 24 April 1928 (second stage)

All 68 seats in the Constituent Assembly 35 seats needed for a majority
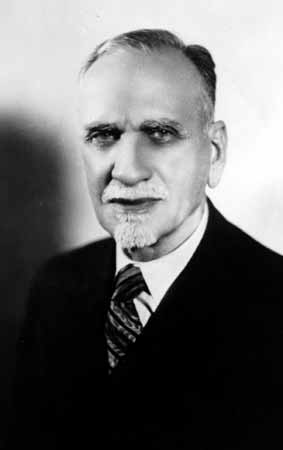

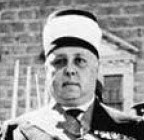
	First party	Second party
Leader	Hashim al-Atassi	Taj al-Din al-Hasani
Party	National Bloc	Pro-French independents
Elected Speaker
Hashim al-Atassi
National Bloc

Constituent Assembly elections were held in Syria on 10 and 24 April 1928. The elections were organised with the explicit aim of producing a constituent assembly tasked with drafting a permanent constitution for Syria under the French mandate. The elections resulted in a decisive victory for the National Bloc, despite extensive efforts by the French mandatory authorities and the pro-French government of Sheikh Taj al-Din al-Hasani to secure a more compliant assembly.

== Background ==
By 1928, France had administered Syria for eight years without producing a constitution — a delay that risked giving the League of Nations the impression that France was incapable of fulfilling its mandatory obligations. The conclusion of the Anglo-Iraqi Treaty of 1922 and the ending of the British Mandate over Iraq had enhanced Britain's international standing and relieved it of the costs of the mandate, drawing unfavourable comparisons with France's ongoing direct rule in Syria.

Syrian nationalists continued to reject the mandate, resist French authority, and demand that a freely elected constituent assembly draft a constitution, alongside the conclusion of a treaty with France. These pressures led High Commissioner Henri Ponsot to announce the formation of a new government tasked with preparing elections for April 1928.

Separately, the mandatory authority had also been under pressure because no prior understanding had been reached between the High Commissioner and Syrian nationalists on the key points of a future constitution or a future Franco-Syrian treaty.

== Pre-election measures ==
=== Formation of the al-Hasani government ===
On 15 February 1928, roughly four months before the elections, Ponsot formed the First Taj al-Din al-Hasani government. The mandatory authorities placed their hopes in this government to build an assembly fully supportive of their views on a future constitution and a future Franco-Syrian treaty, and to ensure the election of moderate deputies to the Constituent Assembly. Ponsot provided the government with funds and enlisted the help of his representative in Damascus, de La Louge, along with intelligence officers and officials from residencies in Damascus, Aleppo, Homs, Hama, and the districts, to secure the election of deputies who would accept the constitution France desired.

=== Ponsot's declaration ===
Alongside the announcement of the government's formation, Ponsot issued a declaration stating that elections would be held in Syria in preparation for electing a constituent assembly. He stated that the elections would be conducted according to established laws guaranteeing all parties freedom of vote, and that all restrictions on freedoms — inherited from the period of Great Syrian Revolt — would be lifted. He affirmed that the elected assembly would give Syria its final basic law, enacted "in complete and absolute freedom within the limits set by the international agreements for which the mandatory power is responsible before the League of Nations."

This declaration coincided with the lifting of martial law in the city and district of Damascus, which had been in force since 24 November 1925.

=== Partial amnesty ===
The High Commissioner issued a general amnesty prior to the elections. However, it excluded charges related to the Great Syrian Revolt and prominent Syrian and Lebanese nationalist leaders, among them Abd al-Rahman Shahbandar, Shukri al-Quwatli, Ihsan al-Jabiri, Sultan al-Atrash, Shakib Arslan, Fawzi al-Qawuqji, and others. Ponsot also published a "blacklist" of 64 individuals — including Shahbandar, al-Quwatli, and Sultan al-Atrash — who were barred from returning to Syria. As a result, the leaders of the armed resistance were unable to participate in the elections, and the partial amnesty failed to produce its intended effect on the Syrian public.

=== Formation of the National Bloc ===
In preparation for the elections, Syrian nationalists formed a new political grouping that brought together members of former pro-independence parties, and independent figures drawn largely from local notables. The new grouping took the name al-Kutla al-Wataniyya (the National Bloc) and went on to play a central role in Syria's political struggle for independence. The Bloc's members elected Hashim al-Atassi — the former president of the Syrian Congress from 1919 to 1920 and prime minister under King Faisal in 1920 — as leader of the Bloc.

Nationalist leaders also called on Syrians abroad, particularly in Egypt, to set aside internal divisions. Atassi issued a statement urging exiled compatriots to cease divisive propaganda and work together for their country's advancement.

== Electoral system ==
The elections were conducted under arrangements established by a High Commissioner’s arrêté dated 20 March 1928, which consolidated earlier electoral decrees for Damascus (arrêtés 2144 and 2145 of 1923), Aleppo, and Deir ez-Zor (arrêté 2844 of 1924). The electoral law retained the Ottoman-era two-stage system of indirect elections. In the first stage, voters in rural sub-districts and urban neighbourhoods elected secondary electors; in the second stage, these secondary electors chose the deputies to the Constituent Assembly. Electoral districts for the first stage corresponded to rural sub-districts and city quarters, while second-stage districts corresponded to districts (aqdiyya) and the cities of Damascus and Aleppo.

Representation was apportioned at the rate of one deputy for every 6,000 registered voters, with an additional seat granted where the remainder exceeded 3,000 voters. Districts with fewer than 3,000 voters could be grouped together for representation purposes. The law also established a confessional allocation system intended to ensure proportional representation of religious communities. Minority sects whose numbers were insufficient to obtain representation individually could be grouped together into a common minority constituency. Separate representation was also provided for Bedouin tribes, with designated deputies elected by tribal chiefs in Damascus, Aleppo, and Deir ez-Zor.

Voting in the first stage was restricted to male citizens aged at least 21 who had resided in their electoral district for a minimum of six months and possessed civil and political rights. Second-stage electors were required to be at least 25 years old, while candidates had to be literate, at least 30 years old, and registered as first-stage voters in the district in which they stood for election. Members of the armed forces, gendarmerie, and other security services were generally barred from voting while in active service and were ineligible to stand as candidates.

Voting was conducted by secret ballot and elections were decided by majority vote. First-stage elections used relative majority voting, with one secondary elector elected for every 100 first-stage voters. In second-stage elections, candidates were required to obtain an absolute majority if at least four-fifths of secondary electors participated; otherwise, a second ballot was held in which a relative majority sufficed.

== Campaign and controversies ==
On the eve of the elections, the National Bloc and Sheikh Taj al-Din reached an implicit alliance, agreeing to present a joint list of six government candidates and four Bloc candidates for the second round. However, when it became apparent that the French-backed government was using public services to secure its candidates in the preliminary elections, nationalist leaders accused Interior Minister Sa'id Muhasini and Sheikh Taj al-Din himself of bribing candidates and manipulating ballot boxes in the Damascus neighbourhoods of Souq Sarouja and al-Qaymariyya — where the National Bloc suffered setbacks at the ballot box.

On 12 April, Fawzi al-Ghazzi, a National Bloc candidate and popular local political figure, led large demonstrations against Taj al-Din and his government in Souq Sarouja and al-Shaghour, the traditional centre of resistance to French authority.

On 24 April, the final day of voting, Taj al-Din — who had placed himself at the top of all electoral lists — made strenuous efforts to buy votes in villages of the Ghouta district, which fell under the Damascus electoral district. Various sums were distributed, reportedly around £600 sterling according to the British Consul, presented ostensibly as compensation for damages suffered by those villages during the Great Syrian Revolt. The funds were transported and distributed by government vehicles.

In Damascus, Taj al-Din requested that Fawzi al-Bakri organise a group of armed men carrying clubs to ensure a "peaceful" election — an act that enraged National Bloc supporters, who despised al-Bakri for siding with Taj al-Din. Clashes broke out in Marjeh Square between al-Bakri's group and spontaneously organised Bloc youth, prompting gendarmerie intervention on the side of government supporters. Further disturbances occurred at polling stations in al-Shaghour and Bab Sharqi. Electoral fraud was later noted by several figures of that era, including Abd al-Rahman al-Kayyali in his book al-Marahil.

== Results ==
Despite the turmoil, the elections proceeded largely in favour of the National Bloc. In Damascus, most of the elected deputies were National Bloc members.

In Aleppo, the National Bloc also prevailed, though registered voter turnout reached only around 35%; ten deputies were elected and the Bloc won easily. National Bloc supporters were similarly returned in Homs and Hama, where turnout reached approximately 50%.

Although the results were not entirely clear-cut — being favourable to the nationalists in the cities and to moderates in the rural areas — the moderates in the assembly subsequently aligned with the nationalist positions, uniting around a clearly defined national programme.

== Aftermath ==
The Constituent Assembly convened in Damascus on 9 June 1928, and its members elected Hashim al-Atassi as its president. The members of the assembly worked rapidly, and on 11 August 1928, they approved in a first reading the text of the first constitution of the Syrian Republic.
