= 1936 Syrian parliamentary election =

- 14 November 1936 (first stage); 30 November 1936 (second stage)

All 85 seats in the Chamber of Deputies 43 seats needed for a majority
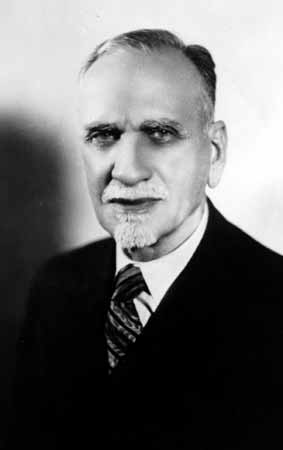
	First party
Leader	Hashim al-Atassi
Party	National Bloc
Prime Minister before election
Ata Bey al-Ayyubi
Independent
Elected Prime Minister
Jamil Mardam Bey
National Bloc

Parliamentary elections were held in Syria on 14 and 30 November 1936 under the French Mandate, resulting in a landslide victory for the National Bloc. The elections were held in accordance with the agreement between Hashim al-Atassi and High Commissioner Damien de Martel that had brought the general strike of 1936 to an end, under which the Constitution of 1930 was restored and parliamentary elections were organised. The outcome marked the first time a national Arab government came to power in Damascus through the ballot box, eighteen years after Faisal I had established the first Arab government in the city following the separation of the Arab provinces from the Ottoman Empire, and sixteen years after the fall of the Arab Kingdom of Syria and the imposition of the Mandate following the Battle of Maysalun.

== Background ==
The 1936 elections were the direct consequence of several overlapping developments: the general strike of 1936, the negotiation of the Franco-Syrian Treaty of Independence, and the restoration of the 1930 constitution.

The delegation that had negotiated the Franco-Syrian Treaty returned from Paris to scenes of popular jubilation in both Aleppo and Damascus, where celebrations in the capital lasted four days. Acting on the Atassi–de Martel agreement that had ended the general strike, the 1930 constitution was restored and legislative elections were called.

President Mohammad Ali al-Abid, recognising that Syria was entering a new era, submitted his resignation to parliament on 21 December 1936, six months before the expiry of his term of office.

== Electoral system ==
The elections were conducted according to the two-stage voting system established in 1928, with the first stage on 14 November and the second on 30 November 1936.

== Results ==
National Bloc candidates won an overwhelming majority of seats. In the first session of the new parliament, deputies elected Fares al-Khoury as President of the Chamber.

Following President al-Abid's resignation, the chamber proceeded to elect a new president. The parliament elected Hashim al-Atassi in the first round of voting, with 74 votes out of 82.

Upon assuming office, Atassi appointed Jamil Mardam Bey as Prime Minister. Within a few days, Mardam formed a cabinet of four ministers, which for the first time included a Ministry of Defence and a Ministry of Foreign Affairs. All four ministerial portfolios were placed in the hands of National Bloc members — two from Damascus and two from Aleppo. The first act of the new government was to sign the Franco-Syrian Treaty and refer it to parliament for ratification.
