= 1943 Syrian parliamentary election =

- 7 July 1943 (first stage); 26 July 1943 (second stage)

All 124 seats in the Chamber of Deputies 63 seats needed for a majority
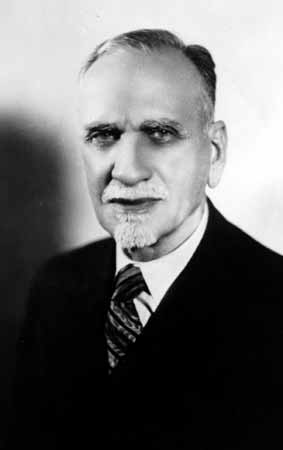
	First party
Leader	Hashim al-Atassi
Party	National Bloc
Seats won	Majority
Prime Minister before election
Ata Bey al-Ayyubi
Independent
Elected Prime Minister
Saadallah al-Jabiri
National Bloc

Parliamentary elections were held in Syria in July 1943 under the Free French administration, following the restoration of the Constitution of 1930. Conducted according to the voting system in use since 1928, the elections resulted in a decisive victory for the National Bloc, which secured a majority of seats in the parliament. The elections, together with the concurrent restoration of the Syrian and Lebanese constitutions, were welcomed throughout the Arab world and encouraged international recognition of Syria and Lebanon as independent states.

It was the fifth legislative election held in modern Syrian history, and the last under the French Mandate. Described at the time as "pivotal," the election gained widespread coverage in Arabic and international press, which framed it as "a new victory for democracy in Syria."

== Background ==
Following the Allied invasion of Syria and Lebanon in 1941, Free France issued a declaration of independence for Syria. However, the Syrian political class was deeply sceptical, having previously received similar promises from Léon Blum in 1936 and Henri Dentz in 1940. When Charles de Gaulle visited Syria in July 1941 to review arrangements for the country, he considered three approaches: restoring the institutions of 1936 (the presidency, government, and parliament); holding immediate elections; or reaffirming the principle of independence already granted whilst deferring its implementation until the end of the war and linking it to the signature of an alliance treaty between France and Syria.

De Gaulle set aside the option of immediate elections — favoured by General Georges Catroux, the newly appointed Delegate-General — out of concern that free elections held in the presence of a strong British military force in Syria would focus attention solely on independence. He preferred to contact the former Syrian authorities and attempted to restore the institutions of 1936. He met twice with former President Hashim al-Atassi — once in Homs, Atassi's home city, and once in Chtaura in the Bekaa Valley. Atassi and the other nationalist leaders did not oppose the restoration of the 1936 institutions in principle, but Atassi refused to sign a new treaty with France, as he could not prejudge Franco-Syrian relations after the war, and regarded the 1936 treaty as having passed its moment. Jamil Mardam Bey, the Prime Minister elected in 1936, offered the same response. Faced with a united Syrian political front, France was compelled, as it had been in 1928 and 1932, to turn to Sheikh Taj al-Din al-Hasani, with his reputation for pro-French sympathies. General Catroux appointed him Head of State on 16 September 1941. The principle of independence was reaffirmed, but the constitution was not restored and elections were postponed. As a gesture of goodwill, General Catroux reintegrated the Druze and Alawite territories into Syria on 12 December 1942.

The British criticised the Free French and accused them of undermining Allied morale throughout the Arab world on account of their Syrian policy. Through their regional representative General Edward Spears and Prime Minister Winston Churchill in London, the British pressed the Free French throughout 1942 to organise elections in Syria and Lebanon. De Gaulle was unmoved, wishing first to resolve the question of an alliance treaty. General Catroux met again with Atassi, who proved as unyielding as he had been with de Gaulle, once more refusing to settle Syria's future relations with France on the terms of the 1936 treaty, and agreeing to the arrangement only for the duration of the war.

In June 1942, British pressure resulted in the initiation of preparations to call for elections. However, the advance of German General Erwin Rommel in Libya and the fall of Tobruk on 21 June 1942 provided the French delegation an opportunity to postpone the matter indefinitely once again. During his visit to Syria and Lebanon between August and September 1942, De Gaulle stated that Syria and Lebanon were "not ready for independence" and that discussing elections was "premature."

Following the Battle of El Alamein in early November 1942, the diminishing German threat to the Suez Canal, combined with persistent internal and external pressure, prompted General Catroux to promise that elections would be held that same month.

Eventually, on a proposal from General Catroux, the French Committee of National Liberation decided, following its London meeting in 1942, to hold elections in Syria and Lebanon in the summer of 1943.

=== Death of Taj al-Din al-Hasani ===
On 17 January 1943, President Taj al-Din al-Hasani (1885–1943) died suddenly, having served as president since 16 September 1941. At the time, he was the most prominent pro-French political figure in Syria and the primary rival to the National Bloc following the assassination of Abd al-Rahman Shahbandar. His sudden death raised suspicions of British intelligence involvement—with claims suggesting it was caused by an overdose of medication—though the official report attributed it to a heart attack. Nonetheless, his passing broke the political stalemate.

General Catroux attempted to convince National Bloc leaders Hashim al-Atassi and Shukri al-Quwatli, individually, to assume the presidency and form a cabinet, but both attempts failed. Consequently, Catroux reached an agreement with the National Bloc—as virtually the only active political organization on the Syrian scene at the time—to hold elections supervised by a neutral cabinet, preempting potential popular escalation by the Bloc or British intervention imposing different terms.

=== Restoration of the constitution and caretaker government ===
Following the death of Taj al-Din al-Hasani in 1943, General Catroux restored the Constitution of 1930. In March 1943, shortly before his departure from his post as Delegate-General in Syria and Lebanon, he appointed a new interim government under Ata Bey al-Ayyubi, charged with preparing for the elections. Catroux issued a statement explaining that, in order to restore constitutional order, it would be necessary to reinstate the institutions of authority that had been in place in 1939, when the constitution was suspended, the parliament dissolved, and the president resigned. However, former President Atassi rejected this approach and called instead for fresh elections. In keeping with this spirit, the Ayyubi government was formed specifically to prepare for the forthcoming elections.

== Electoral system ==
The elections were conducted in accordance with the voting system in use since 1928.

== Results ==
The National Bloc won a majority of seats in the Damascus parliament. Two thirds of the successful deputies were among those who had been elected to the parliament of 1936. Fares al-Khoury was elected as president of the Chamber of Deputies.

According to Georges Catroux, voter turnout reached only 35% of the total electorate. Alongside the National Bloc, seats were won by blocs of independents, tribal representatives, and figures affiliated with the Mandate, who were known as the "Moderates." The parliament elected Shukri al-Quwatli as President of the Republic, who in turn tasked Saadallah al-Jabiri with forming the government. By mutual agreement, similar elections were held in Lebanon during the same period.
