= 1947 Syrian parliamentary election =

- 7 July 1947

All 127 seats in the Chamber of Deputies 64 seats needed for a majority
	First party	Second party	Third party
Party	Liberal	Independent	National Party
Seats won	53	50	24
Prime Minister before election
Jamil Mardam Bey
Elected Prime Minister
Jamil Mardam Bey

The 1947 Syrian parliamentary election was held on 7 July 1947, with a second round in some constituencies on 18 July, to elect members of the unicameral Chamber of Deputies, the predecessor to the People's Assembly. They were the first elections since the country's independence in 1946.

== Electoral system ==
A new electoral law was approved by Parliament in May 1947. This introduced a two-round system, with members elected from single-member constituencies by universal male suffrage. Any candidate that received more than 10% of the vote was allowed to contest the second round if no candidate had received an absolute majority. Ten seats were reserved for Bedouins, one of which was in Jabal al-Druze. The electoral law also required voting to be extended by a day if first round turnout in a constituency was less than 60%.

== Campaign ==
Prior to the elections, the National Bloc had split into two factions; the National Party of President Shukri al-Quwatli was formed in early 1947, with a group of Aleppo-based opponents of al-Quwatli forming another faction. Al-Quwatli's opponents and members of the newly formed Ba'ath Party contested the elections together under the Liberal Party (Hizb al-Ahrar) name.

Neither the National Party or its opponents produced a lengthy manifesto. The National Party was largely interested in protecting wealthy residents of Damascus, while the Aleppo-based opposition published a short manifesto proposing reforms in rural areas to raise the standard of living.

== Results ==
Party	Seats
Liberal Party	53
National Party	24
Independents	50
Total	127
Source: Moubayed

== Aftermath ==
Following the elections, Fares al-Khoury was elected Speaker and incumbent Prime Minister Jamil Mardam Bey was appointed to form a government by al-Quwatli. In 1948 the non-Ba'ath Party opposition members formed the People's Party.
