= List of Syrian by-elections =

This is an incomplete list of by-elections in Syria. By-elections in Syria occur to fill vacant seats in the Syrian Parliament.

== By-elections ==
=== 1932–1933 Chamber of Deputies ===
Electoral district	Date	Previous incumbent	Party	Winner	Party	Cause
Damascus and suburbs	1932	Muhammad Ali al-Abid	Independent			Resigned after being elected President of the Republic on 11 June 1932.

=== 1936–1939 Chamber of Deputies ===
Electoral district	Date	Previous incumbent	Party	Winner	Party	Cause
Homs and suburbs	1937	Hashim al-Atassi	National Bloc	Mukarram al-Atassi	National Bloc	Resigned after being elected President of the Republic on 22 December 1936.

=== 1943–1947 Chamber of Deputies ===
At the dissolution of the Chamber of Deputies in 1947, there were two vacancies: one in the Homs and suburbs electoral district, caused by the resignation of National Bloc member Mukarram al-Atassi, and one in the Damascus and suburbs electoral district, caused by the resignation of National Bloc member Afif al-Sulh. Given the proximity of the 1947 parliamentary election, by-elections were not called for these seats.

Electoral district	Date	Previous incumbent	Party	Winner	Party	Cause
Damascus and suburbs	Between 17 August and 19 October 1943	Shukri al-Quwatli	National Bloc	Fakhri al-Baroudi	National Bloc	Resigned after being elected President of the Republic on 18 August 1943.
Bedouin tribes (Damascus desert)	April 1946	Tarrad al-Milhim		Tamer al-Milhim		Death.
Homs and suburbs	16 or 17 October 1946	Hilmi al-Atassi	National Bloc	Mukarram al-Atassi	National Bloc	Hilmi al-Atassi died on 26 August 1946, in a plane crash.
Aleppo	23 or 24 October 1946	Michel Rafi		Dikran Jerejian	National Bloc	

=== 1947–1949 Chamber of Deputies ===
Electoral district	Date	Previous incumbent	Party	Winner	Party	Cause
Bedouin nomadic tribes (Aleppo – al-Hadidiyin)	3 January 1949	Nawwaf al-Salih		Faisal Nawwaf al-Salih		Death.

=== 1950–1951 Chamber of Deputies ===
Electoral district	Date	Previous incumbent	Party	Winner	Party	Cause
Azaz	December 1950	Nafi' Bakkar	People's Party	Nafi' Bakkar	People's Party	The 1949 election results for some polling stations in the Azaz electoral district were declared void, and a repeat election was called.
Daraa	December 1950	Abd al-Latif al-Miqdad		Muhammad al-Muflih al-Zoubi	Independent	The 1949 election results for some polling stations in the Daraa electoral district were declared void, and a repeat election was called.
Daraa	December 1950	Mustafa al-Dukhan		Muflih al-Mahamid		The 1949 election results for some polling stations in the Daraa electoral district were declared void, and a repeat election was called.
Tartus	December 1950	Anis Muhammad Ismail		Badi' Ismail	Independent	The election of Anis Muhammad Ismail in the 1949 election was declared void on 20 February 1950, and a repeat election was called.
Jableh	December 1950	Ibrahim al-Kinj		Uthman Hasan Esber	People's Party	The 1949 election results for the entire Jableh electoral district were declared void on 20 February 1950, and a repeat election was called.
Jableh	December 1950	Ali Asaad Ismail		Bahjat Nassur		The 1949 election results for the entire Jableh electoral district were declared void on 20 February 1950, and a repeat election was called.
Daraa	July 1951	Muhammad al-Muflih al-Zoubi	Independent	Muhammad al-Muflih al-Zoubi	Independent	The 1950 by-election results for some polling stations in the Daraa electoral district were declared void, and a repeat election was called.
Daraa	July 1951	Muflih al-Mahamid		Muflih al-Mahamid		The 1950 by-election results for some polling stations in the Daraa electoral district were declared void, and a repeat election was called.

=== 1954–1958 Chamber of Deputies ===
Electoral district	Date	Previous incumbent	Party	Winner	Party	Cause
Suwayda	February 1955	Fadlallah Jarbu		Fadlallah Jarbu		Election was invalidated by the Supreme Court on 5 December 1954.
Latakia City	25 and 26 February 1955	Muhammad Asaad Harun		Muhammad Asaad Harun		Election was invalidated by the Supreme Court on 13 December 1954.
Latakia City	25 and 26 February 1955	Nawfal Ilyas		Nawfal Ilyas		Election was invalidated by the Supreme Court on 13 December 1954.
Al-Zawiya	February 1955	Ahmad al-Hussein al-Muhammad		Ahmad al-Hussein al-Muhammad		Elections in some polling stations were invalidated by the Supreme Court on 26 December 1954.
The Ghoutas	February 1955	Muhammad Abu Khayr al-Qahwaji		Mazhar ash-Sharbaji	National Party	Election was invalidated by the Supreme Court on 26 January 1955.
Tigris	March 1955	Uwaynan al-Madlul		Uwaynan al-Madlul		Election was invalidated by the Supreme Court on 10 January 1955.
Al-Qutayfah	12 March 1955	Muhammad Mahmoud Diab		Muhammad Mahmoud Diab		Election was invalidated by the Supreme Court on 12 January 1955.
Izraa	March 1955	Muhammad Youssef Abu Rumiyya		Muhammad Youssef Abu Rumiyya		Elections in some polling stations were invalidated by the Supreme Court on 22 January 1955.
Manbij	11 March 1955	Diab al-Mashi	People's Party	Diab al-Mashi	People's Party	Election was invalidated by the Supreme Court on 27 January 1955.
Manbij	11 March 1955	Muhammad Shaykh Fasih al-Ghanim		Muhammad Shaykh Fasih al-Ghanim		Election was invalidated by the Supreme Court on 27 January 1955.
Tartus	25 and 26 March 1955	Badi' Ismail	Independent	Ismail Hussein		Election was invalidated by the Supreme Court on 30 January 1955.
Tartus	25 and 26 March 1955	Ali Yunus		Riyad Abd al-Razzaq	National Party	Election was invalidated by the Supreme Court on 30 January 1955.
Quneitra	25 and 26 March 1955	Faour al-Faour	Independent	Faour al-Faour	Independent	Elections in some polling stations were invalidated by the Supreme Court on 13 February 1955.
Quneitra	25 and 26 March 1955	Abd al-Razzaq al-Tahhan	Independent	Abd al-Razzaq al-Tahhan	Independent	Elections in some polling stations were invalidated by the Supreme Court on 13 February 1955.
Al-Hasakah	25 and 26 March 1955	Abd al-Aziz al-Maslat		Abd al-Aziz al-Maslat		Elections in some polling stations were invalidated by the Supreme Court on 14 February 1955.
Al-Hasakah	25 and 26 March 1955	Muhammad Lutfi al-Hajj Hussein		Muhammad Lutfi al-Hajj Hussein		Elections in some polling stations were invalidated by the Supreme Court on 14 February 1955.
Al-Hasakah	25 and 26 March 1955	Hawwash bin Jamil al-Maslat		Muhammad Ismail Ibrahim		Elections in some polling stations were invalidated by the Supreme Court on 14 February 1955.
Al-Hasakah	25 and 26 March 1955	Hagop Amsih Marshu		Hagop Amsih Marshu		Elections in some polling stations were invalidated by the Supreme Court on 14 February 1955.
The Ghoutas	April 1955	Hanna al-Kaswani		Hanna al-Kaswani		By-election in some polling stations were invalidated by the Supreme Court on 2 February 1955.
The Ghoutas	22 and 23 July 1955	Mazhar ash-Sharbaji	National Party	Mazhar ash-Sharbaji	National Party	By-election was invalidated by the Supreme Court on 20 June 1955.
Al-Qutayfah	14 August 1955	Muhammad Mahmoud Diab		Muhammad Mahmoud Diab		By-election was invalidated by the Supreme Court on 3 July 1955.
Tartus	2 September 1955	Riyad Abd al-Razzaq	National Party	Riyad Abd al-Razzaq	National Party	By-election in some polling stations was invalidated by the Supreme Court on 23 July 1955.
Tartus	9 October 1955	Ismail Hussein		Muhyi al-Din Murhij	National Party	By-election was invalidated by the Supreme Court on 23 July 1955.
Homs	November 1955	Suleiman al-Maasarani		Ahmad al-Hajj Yunis		Death.
Damascus	4 and 5 May 1957	Munir al-Ajlani	Independent	Riyad al-Malki	Ba'ath Party	The deputy was found guilty of treason and sentenced to death or life imprisonment as part of the aftermath of Operation Straggle, and thus lost his seat in the Chamber.
Homs	4 and 5 May 1957	Adnan al-Atassi	People's Party	Kamal Kalalib	Syrian Communist Party	The deputy was found guilty of treason and sentenced to death or life imprisonment as part of the aftermath of Operation Straggle, and thus lost his seat in the Chamber.
Suwayda	4 and 5 May 1957	Fadlallah Jarbu		Sayyah Abu Asali		The deputy was found guilty of treason and sentenced to death or life imprisonment as part of the aftermath of Operation Straggle, and thus lost his seat in the Chamber.
Tribes of Jabal al-Druze desert	4 and 5 May 1957	Hayil al-Surur		Dhaar al-Jumah	Ba'ath Party	The deputy was found guilty of treason and sentenced to death or life imprisonment as part of the aftermath of Operation Straggle, and thus lost his seat in the Chamber.
Aleppo	25 October 1957	Mikhail Ilyan	National Party	Antoine Hamed		The deputy was found guilty of treason and sentenced to death or life imprisonment as part of the aftermath of Operation Straggle, and thus lost his seat in the Chamber.
Suwayda	25 October 1957	Hasan al-Atrash	Independent	Salman al-Hunaidi	Ba'ath Party	The deputy was found guilty of treason and sentenced to death or life imprisonment as part of the aftermath of Operation Straggle, and thus lost his seat in the Chamber.
Masyaf	20 and 21 December 1957	Jihad al-Hawwash		Qahtan al-Hawwash	Ba'ath Party	

=== 1973–1977 People's Assembly ===
Electoral district	Date	Previous incumbent	Party	Winner	Party	Cause
Damascus	1974	Anwar Kamil		Youssef Kamil		Death.
Hama	1974	George Harika		Michel Risha		Death.
Damascus	1975	Jurji al-Khoury		Yassin Astah		Death.

=== 1977–1981 People's Assembly ===
Electoral district	Date	Previous incumbent	Party	Winner	Party	Cause
Suwayda	9 May 1980	Turki Shalhoub		Said al-Salman		Death.

=== 1981–1985 People's Assembly ===
Electoral district	Date	Previous incumbent	Party	Winner	Party	Cause
Quneitra	1984	Nur al-Din Kanj		Sami al-Saleh		Death.
Latakia	1984	Ahmad Darji		Mustafa Abd al-Halim		Death.
Homs	1984	Tawfiq al-Naqri		Khadr al-Youssef		Death.
Deir ez-Zor	1984	Rayyis al-Fayyad		Ahmad al-Fayyad		Death.
Homs	1985			Abd al-Khaliq Muhib al-Din		Death.

=== 1986–1990 People's Assembly ===
Electoral district	Date	Previous incumbent	Party	Winner	Party	Cause
Deir ez-Zor	29 April 1988	Abboud al-Hafl	Independent	Khalil al-Hafl	Independent	Death.
Aleppo	1988			Muhammad Mamoun Taloustan		Death.

=== 1990–1994 People's Assembly ===
Electoral district	Date	Previous incumbent	Party	Winner	Party	Cause
Daraa	1991	Dheeb al-Hariri		Ibrahim al-Issa		Death.
Aleppo	22 May 1992	Muhammad Fateh Hamwi		Grigor Ablighatian		Death.
Districts of Aleppo Governorate	1993	Hikmat Ibrahim		Mahmoud Abd al-Hadi		Death.
Daraa	28 January 1994	Muhammad Oqab		Qassem al-Rabdawi		Death.

=== 1994–1998 People's Assembly ===
Electoral district	Date	Previous incumbent	Party	Winner	Party	Cause
Tartus	19 May 1995	Yahya Khaddam		Mikhail Hajjar		Death.
Idlib	19 May 1995	Muhammad Majid al-Ramadan		Muhammad Adib Najm		Death.
Deir ez-Zor	14 July 1995	Abdallah Safif		Daoud al-Shaher		Death.
Suwayda	1 September 1995	Jamil al-Faqih		Kamal Ballan		Death.
Idlib	15 March 1996	Muhammad Adib Najm		Muhammad Fuad Najm		Death.
Tartus	21 June 1996	Muhammad Saleh		Wajih al-Sheikh		Death.
Damascus	20 December 1996	Elias Najmeh		Akram al-Khoury		Resigned after being appointed an ambassador.

=== 1998–2002 People's Assembly ===
Electoral district	Date	Previous incumbent	Party	Winner	Party	Cause
Districts of Aleppo Governorate	9 April 1999	Alaa al-Din Shaheima		Muhammad Sameh Jazmati		Death.
Aleppo	9 April 1999	Ali Taljebini		Walid Ikhlasi		Death.
Rif Dimashq	8 December 2000	Mustafa al-Tajjar		Jadallah Qaddour	Arab Socialist Movement	Death.
Homs	2001	Ibrahim Haswa		Mohammed Ghassan al-Masri		Death.
Damascus	2001	Muhammad Marwan Sheikho		Ghalib Aniz		Death.

=== 2003–2007 People's Assembly ===
Electoral district	Date	Previous incumbent	Party	Winner	Party	Cause
Aleppo	25 February 2005	Ahmad Berri		Majd al-Din Hawi		Death.
Latakia	5 March 2005	Jamil al-Assad	Ba'ath Party	Jaafar al-Khair	Ba'ath Party	Death.
Rif Dimashq	11 May 2005	Ahmad Khalil		Imad al-Azab		Resigned after being appointed governor of Rif Dimashq
Rif Dimashq	11 May 2005	Abd al-Rahman al-Ahmar	Independent	Mowaffaq al-Habashi	Independent	Death.
Rif Dimashq	27 September 2005	Atif al-Naddaf	Ba'ath Party	Nazih Abboud	Ba'ath Party	Resigned after being appointed governor of Idlib.
Deir ez-Zor	4 March 2006	Naji al-Sheikh Fares		Nayef al-Sheikh Fares		Death.

=== 2007–2012 People's Assembly ===
Electoral district	Date	Previous incumbent	Party	Winner	Party	Cause
Aleppo	7 September 2007	Abd al-Aziz al-Shami	Independent	Mohammed Anas al-Shami	Independent	Death.
Aleppo	7 September 2007	Hilal Zayn al-Din	Independent	Alaa Zayn al-Din	Independent	Death.
Deir ez-Zor	25 June 2008	Faisal al-Najras	Independent	Safouk al-Najras	Independent	Death.
Rif Dimashq	18 August 2008	Abdallah Sharha	ASU	Fayez al-Safadi	ASU	Death.
Deir ez-Zor	9 May 2009	Ramadan al-Khalaf	Independent	Ziad al-Khalaf	Independent	Death.
Damascus	11 May 2011	Huda al-Homsi	Ba'ath Party	Majda Qteit	Ba'ath Party	Resigned after being appointed an ambassador to Greece.
Districts of Aleppo Governorate	1 November 2009	Diab al-Mashi	Independent	Mohammed Khair al-Mashi	Independent	Death.
Damascus	27 December 2009	Muhammad Nabil al-Khatib	Ba'ath Party	Salah al-Din al-Sadat	Ba'ath Party	Resigned after being appointed head of the Central Authority for Supervision and Inspection.
Aleppo	20 April 2010	Abd al-Fattah Azzouz	Socialist Unionist	Thanaa Fakhr al-Din	ASU	Death.
Deir ez-Zor	2 May 2010	Faisal Sheikh Fayyad	Independent	Mahna Sheikh Fayyad	Independent	Death.
Aleppo	9 May 2010	Adnan al-Sukhni	Ba'ath Party	Muhammad Zaki Hakim	Ba'ath Party	Resigned after being appointed governor of Raqqa.

=== 2012–2016 People's Assembly ===
Electoral district	Date	Previous incumbent	Party	Winner	Party	Cause
Hama	1 December 2012	Nizar Musa	Ba'ath Party	Fadel Warda	Ba'ath Party	Resigned after being appointed governor of Tartus.
Idlib	1 December 2012	Ghassan al-Qanatri	Ba'ath Party	Mohammed Zaher al-Yousefi	Ba'ath Party	Resigned after being appointed governor of Deir ez-Zor.
Districts of Aleppo Governorate	1 December 2012	Ali al-Bish	Ba'ath Party	Abdel Wahhab al-Abd al-Hanan	Ba'ath Party	Defection
Districts of Aleppo Governorate	1 December 2012	Ikhlas Badawi	Ba'ath Party	Muhammad Deeb	Ba'ath Party	Defection
Al-Hasakah	1 December 2012	Sattam al-Dandah	Ba'ath Party	Saleh al-Huwaija	Ba'ath Party	Resigned after being appointed ambassador to Iraq.
Aleppo	9 February 2013	Abdullah Qairouz	SSNP	Mustafa Abu Souf	SSNP	Death.
Al-Hasakah	13 July 2013	Muhammad al-Hilu	Independent	Amira al-Ghanim	Independent	Removed from office by a vote in the People's Assembly.
Deir ez-Zor	2013	Turki al-Zayed al-Mustafa	Ba'ath Party	Jihad al-Shekheir	Independent	
Deir ez-Zor	7 January 2014	Mujhim al-Sahu	Ba'ath Party	Sattam al-Dandal	Ba'ath Party	Murdered by ISIS in 2013.
Damascus	16 March 2014	Wafaa Khalifah	Ba'ath Party	Maha Shbero	Ba'ath Party	Death.
Hama	27 December 2014	Waris al-Younis	Ba'ath Party	Khader al-Saleh	Ba'ath Party	Assassinated in October 2014.
Aleppo	17 January 2015	Mohammed Marwan Ulabi	Ba'ath Party	Mohammed Maher al-Muwaqqi	Ba'ath Party	Resigned after being appointed governor of Aleppo.
Homs	11 April 2015	Mohammed Zuhair Ghannoum	Independent	Saleh Maarouf	Ba'ath Party	
Districts of Aleppo Governorate	9 May 2015	Abdallah al-Shallash	Independent	Fares Jneidan	Independent	Death.
Tartus	4 July 2015	Samir Jawhara	Ba'ath Party	Bassem Ahmad	Ba'ath Party	Death.
Damascus	2015	Nader Baira	Ba'ath Party	Samir al-Jazaerli	Ba'ath Party	Removed by the Assembly, reportedly due to absence from meetings.
Damascus	2015	Qadri Jamil	People's Will Party	Tarif Qutrash	Independent	Removed by the Assembly, reportedly due to absence from meetings.
Rif Dimashq	2015	Mustafa Hammoud	DSUP	Ahmad Ahmad al-Dalati	Independent	Removed by the Assembly, reportedly due to absence from meetings.
Homs	2015	Abdo al-Najib	Independent	Ziad al-Talib	Independent	Removed by the Assembly, reportedly due to absence from meetings.
Districts of Aleppo Governorate	2015	Mohammed Arabo	Ba'ath Party	Omar al-Aroub	Ba'ath Party	Removed by the Assembly, reportedly due to absence from meetings.
Districts of Aleppo Governorate	2015	Mohammed Fadi al-Quraan	Ba'ath Party	Abd al-Razzaq Barakat	Ba'ath Party	Removed by the Assembly, reportedly due to absence from meetings.
Raqqa	2015	Imad Mohammed	Independent	Faisal Haji Omar	Independent	Removed by the Assembly, reportedly due to absence from meetings.
Al-Hasakah	2015	Saeed Elia	Ba'ath Party	Nidal Eshu	Ba'ath Party	Removed by the Assembly, reportedly due to absence from meetings.
Daraa	2015	Taiseer al-Jegheini	Independent	Ali al-Ghazali	Independent	Removed by the Assembly, reportedly due to absence from meetings.
Quneitra	2015	Saleh al-Tahan al-Naimi	Ba'ath Party	Mohammed al-Afish	Ba'ath Party	Removed by the Assembly, reportedly due to absence from meetings.
Idlib	14 November 2015	Abdo Alo	Ba'ath Party	Khaled al-Daher	Ba'ath Party	Removed by the Assembly.

=== 2016–2020 People's Assembly ===
Electoral district	Date	Previous incumbent	Party	Winner	Party	Cause
Districts of Aleppo Governorate	15 January 2017	Muhammad al-Hazwari	Ba'ath Party	Ahmad Saleh Ibrahim	Ba'ath Party	Resigned after being appointed governor of Hama.
Districts of Aleppo Governorate	18 February 2017	Fahmi al-Hassan	Independent	Qadri al-Hassan	Independent	Death.
Deir ez-Zor	30 December 2017	Hamadi al-Hassani	Ba'ath Party	Aytan al-Aytan	Ba'ath Party	Death.
Tartus	24 February 2018	Saer Ibrahim	Ba'ath Party	Qutaiba Badr	Ba'ath Party	Death.
Aleppo	14 April 2018	Abd al-Majid al-Kawakibi	Ba'ath Party	Muhammad Ammar Karman	Ba'ath Party	Resigned after being appointed governor of Deir ez-Zor.
Damascus	23 June 2018	Mohammad Jihad al-Laham	Ba'ath Party	Maan Ghanim	Ba'ath Party	Resigned after being appointed head of the Supreme Constitutional Court.
Raqqa	23 June 2018	Faisal Haji Omar	Independent	Muhammad al-Turki	Independent	Resignation
Homs	22 December 2018	Jamal Rabaa	Ba'ath Party	Muhammad Saleh al-Raee	Ba'ath Party	Death.
Hama	22 December 2018	Khader al-Saleh	Ba'ath Party	Basim al-Naameh	Ba'ath Party	Death.
Districts of Aleppo Governorate	19 October 2019	Ali al-Zeidan	Ba'ath Party	Ahmad al-Zeidan	Ba'ath Party	Death.
Idlib	11 January 2020	Ahmad Qabbani	Ba'ath Party	Election not held (Note: While initially scheduled to be held on 11 January 2020, the by-election was postponed due to COVID-19 restrictions, and ultimately never held before the 2020 parliamentary election.)		Death.

=== 2020–2024 People's Assembly ===
Electoral district	Date	Previous incumbent	Party	Winner	Party	Cause
Deir ez-Zor	12 December 2020	Taha al-Khalifah	Ba'ath Party	Yasser al-Salama	Ba'ath Party	Resignation
Homs	27 November 2021	Fadia Deeb	Ba'ath Party	Bassam al-Muhammad	Ba'ath Party	Resignation
Deir ez-Zor	13 March 2022	Adnan al-Jum'ah	Socialist Unionist	Bashar Shubat	Socialist Unionist	Death.
Damascus	2 July 2022	Noura Arisian	Independent	Ruba Mirza	Independent	Resigned after being appointed ambassador to Armenia.
Rif Dimashq	3 December 2022	Ahmad Jamil Ibrahim	Ba'ath Party	Muhammad Qaddour al-Ainiya	Ba'ath Party	Death.
Districts of Aleppo Governorate	3 December 2022	Fadel Kaadeh	Ba'ath Party	Adnan Shahadeh	Ba'ath Party	Death.
Damascus	29 April 2023	Basima Shater	Ba'ath Party	Muhammad Nabil al-Homsi	Ba'ath Party	Death.

=== 2024 People's Assembly ===
Electoral district	Date	Previous incumbent	Party	Winner	Party	Cause
Aleppo	25 January 2025 (Note: Originally scheduled for 7 December 2024, the elections were postponed and effectively cancelled following the suspension and subsequent dissolution of the People's Assembly by the Syrian caretaker government.)	Shadi Dibsi	Independent	Election not held		Removed by the People's Assembly due to acquiring a foreign citizenship.
Tartus	7 December 2024	Tony Hanna	Ba'ath Party	Election not held (Note: The elections were effectively cancelled following the suspension and subsequent dissolution of the People's Assembly by the Syrian caretaker government.)		Resigned after being appointed governor of Quneitra.
Damascus	21 December 2024	Muhammad Hamsho	Independent	Election not held		Removed by the People's Assembly due to acquiring a foreign citizenship.
Districts of Aleppo Governorate	25 January 2025 (Note: Originally scheduled for 21 December 2024, the elections were postponed and effectively cancelled following the suspension and subsequent dissolution of the People's Assembly by the Syrian caretaker government.)	Mohammed Khair al-Mashi	Independent	Election not held		Death.
Damascus	21 December 2024	Anas al-Khatib	Ba'ath Party	Election not held		Removed by the People's Assembly due to acquiring a foreign citizenship.
Damascus	21 December 2024	Mohammad Khaled Zbeidi	Ba'ath Party	Election not held		Removed by the People's Assembly due to acquiring a foreign citizenship.

== See also ==
- Elections in Syria
