= List of members of the People's Assembly (Syria), 1986–1990 =

This is a list of members elected to the 4th People's Assembly, following the 1986 parliamentary election.

== Members ==
No.	Electoral district	Sector	Name	Party
1	Damascus	A	Farouk Thuraya	
2	Damascus	A	Abd al-Razzaq Aqbiq	
3	Damascus	A	Hajar Sadiq	
4	Damascus	A	Muhammad Munir Rihawi	
5	Damascus	A	Muhammad Marwan Sheikho	
6	Damascus	A	Hani al-Rumani	
7	Damascus	A	Muhammad Khair Halabi	
8	Damascus	A	Nasr al-Din al-Bahra	
9	Damascus	B	Abd al-Qadir Qaddura	Ba'ath Party
10	Damascus	B	Muhammad Shakir Asaid	
11	Damascus	B	Ferial Muhayni	
12	Damascus	B	Hanan Najmeh	
13	Damascus	B	Muhammad Adib al-Khatib	
14	Damascus	B	Muhammad Hilal al-Saudi	
15	Damascus	B	Ali al-Turkmeni	
16	Damascus	B	Wissal Farha	
17	Damascus	B	Nur al-Din Habbal	
18	Damascus	B	Muhammad Abu al-Khair Abidin	
19	Damascus	B	Mahmoud Jabr	
20	Damascus	B	Zuhair Urabi	
21	Damascus	B	Muhammad Zuhair al-Awa	
22	Damascus	B	Muhammad Siyah al-Sarouji	
23	Rif Dimashq	A	Ahmad Qablan	
24	Rif Dimashq	A	Hassan Beiraqdar	
25	Rif Dimashq	A	Ruiyat Ofouf al-Yassin	
26	Rif Dimashq	A	Muhammad Shaddad	
27	Rif Dimashq	A	Muwaffaq al-Azab	
28	Rif Dimashq	A	Hilal Rizq	
29	Rif Dimashq	A	Widad Zarqa	
30	Rif Dimashq	A	Yassin al-Shalabi	
31	Rif Dimashq	B	Amin Hayrab	
32	Rif Dimashq	B	Salah Darwish	
33	Rif Dimashq	B	Karam al-Khoury	
34	Rif Dimashq	B	Majed Izzo Rahibani	
35	Rif Dimashq	B	Mustafa Slakho	
36	Rif Dimashq	B	Mustafa Awwad al-Rifai	
37	Rif Dimashq	B	Youssef Jaidani	
38	Aleppo	A	Muhammad Fateh Hamwi	
39	Aleppo	A	Darwish Darwish	
40	Aleppo	A	Ahmad Tawfiq Qarna	
41	Aleppo	A	Ahmad al-Labid	
42	Aleppo	A	Ali Basmaji	
43	Aleppo	A	Layla al-Turkmani	
44	Aleppo	B	Malak Martini	
45	Aleppo	B	Adnan Ismail	
46	Aleppo	B	Jurji Azar	
47	Aleppo	B	Farajallah Mousalli	
48	Aleppo	B	Muhammad Adel Jamous	
49	Aleppo	B	Muhammad Dhafer Khairallah	
50	Aleppo	B	Ali Rida	
51	Aleppo	B	Abdallah Mousalli	
52	Aleppo	B	Muhammad Raed Beiraqdar	
53	Aleppo	B	Grigor Ablighatian	
54	Districts of Aleppo Governorate	A	Sobhi Kanno	
55	Districts of Aleppo Governorate	A	Ibrahim al-Othman	
56	Districts of Aleppo Governorate	A	Ali Hamadeh	
57	Districts of Aleppo Governorate	A	Ahmad Shawqi Kallou	
58	Districts of Aleppo Governorate	A	Issa al-Zamel	
59	Districts of Aleppo Governorate	A	Abd al-Razzaq Abd al-Majid	
60	Districts of Aleppo Governorate	A	Sami al-Shihabi	
61	Districts of Aleppo Governorate	A	Abd al-Rahman Nima	
62	Districts of Aleppo Governorate	A	Jassem al-Ibrahim	
63	Districts of Aleppo Governorate	A	Muhammad Naji Darwish	
64	Districts of Aleppo Governorate	A	Diab al-Mashi	Independent
65	Districts of Aleppo Governorate	A	Taha Ghabash	
66	Districts of Aleppo Governorate	A	Ismail al-Nasser	
67	Districts of Aleppo Governorate	B	Rifat Bilal	
68	Districts of Aleppo Governorate	B	Omar al-Ibrahim	
69	Districts of Aleppo Governorate	B	Abd al-Majid Loulak	
70	Districts of Aleppo Governorate	B	Muhammad al-Hassan	
71	Districts of Aleppo Governorate	B	Wahid Abu Ras	
72	Districts of Aleppo Governorate	B	Ahmad al-Said	
73	Districts of Aleppo Governorate	B	Battal Battal	
74	Districts of Aleppo Governorate	B	Ali Attar	
75	Districts of Aleppo Governorate	B	Ali al-Ibrahim	
76	Districts of Aleppo Governorate	B	Ahmad Mukhtar	
77	Districts of Aleppo Governorate	B	Ismat Ghabari	
78	Districts of Aleppo Governorate	B	Farouq al-Jasim	
79	Homs	A	Mahmoud Marouf	
80	Homs	A	Abd al-Hadi Asaad	
81	Homs	A	Said Farzat	
82	Homs	A	Saadallah al-Naqri	
83	Homs	A	Hikmat al-Khouli	
84	Homs	A	Mahmoud al-Diab	
85	Homs	A	Abd al-Aziz al-Mulhim	Ba'ath Party
86	Homs	A	Abd al-Karim al-Marai	
87	Homs	A	Kamal al-Shaghouri	
88	Homs	B	Muhammad Ghazi Tayyara	
89	Homs	B	Ibrahim Ibrahim	
90	Homs	B	Shakir Barghouth	
91	Homs	B	Muhammad Amin al-Hassami	
92	Homs	B	Hiyam al-Soufi	
93	Homs	B	Sabaa al-Sabaa	
94	Homs	B	Maurice Salibi	Syrian Communist Party
95	Homs	B	Abd al-Majid Tarabulsi	
96	Homs	B	Wael al-Bunni	
97	Hama	A	Ibrahim Zaarour	
98	Hama	A	Amin al-Bakir	
99	Hama	A	Ahmad al-Hadid	
100	Hama	A	Ahmad al-Ahmad	
101	Hama	A	Khalil Mahfoud	
102	Hama	A	Ghasoun Murad Agha	
103	Hama	A	Michel Richa	
104	Hama	A	Mahmoud Khairbek	
105	Hama	A	Muhammad al-Abboud	
106	Hama	A	Youssef al-Khalifa	
107	Hama	B	Walid Hamdoun	Ba'ath Party
108	Hama	B	Ahmad al-Ali	
109	Hama	B	Ahmad al-Khattab	
110	Hama	B	Hassan Ghali	
111	Hama	B	Hikmat Fardawi	
112	Hama	B	Munawwer Makhlouta	
113	Hama	B	Muhammad Habbal	
114	Latakia	A	Farid Janauro	
115	Latakia	A	Rafiq Darwish	
116	Latakia	A	Mustafa Abd al-Halim	
117	Latakia	A	Wafaa Snain	
118	Latakia	A	Tawfiq Ibrahim	
119	Latakia	A	Tawfiq Darwish	
120	Latakia	A	Ibrahim al-Lawza	
121	Latakia	B	Ahmad Abu Musa	
122	Latakia	B	Jamil al-Assad	Ba'ath Party
123	Latakia	B	Karim al-Shaibani	
124	Latakia	B	Adnan Khuzeim	
125	Latakia	B	Mahmoud Ajil	
126	Latakia	B	Muhammad Saad	
127	Idlib	A	Ahmad Fawzi Hamidan	
128	Idlib	A	Ikram al-Yousefi	
129	Idlib	A	Khalid al-Khader	
130	Idlib	A	Omar al-Rai	
131	Idlib	A	Karim Sheikh Karim	
132	Idlib	A	Muhammad Shakib al-Taha	
133	Idlib	A	Mustafa Alloush	
134	Idlib	A	Munir Qatini	
135	Idlib	A	Muhammad Nadhir al-Dweidri	
136	Idlib	B	Tawfiq al-Ibrahim	
137	Idlib	B	Abd al-Karim Manna	
138	Idlib	B	Mahmoud Haj Ahmad	
139	Idlib	B	Mahdi Janem	
140	Idlib	B	Muhammad Naffakh	
141	Tartus	A	Izz al-Din Nasser	
142	Tartus	A	Muhammad Ghassan Tayyara	
143	Tartus	A	Sharif Hassan	
144	Tartus	A	Youssef Youssef	
145	Tartus	A	Ahmad Hassan	Ba'ath Party
146	Tartus	B	Mahmoud Diyoub	
147	Tartus	B	Mustafa Najm	
148	Tartus	B	Muhammad Zugheibi	
149	Tartus	B	Nawal al-Muhammad	
150	Tartus	B	Najm al-Din al-Saleh	
151	Raqqa	A	Mustafa al-Ayed	
152	Raqqa	A	Mazlouh al-Ali	
153	Raqqa	A	Najwa al-Ajeili	
154	Raqqa	B	Ismail Abd al-Ghani	
155	Raqqa	B	Faisal Alwani	
156	Raqqa	B	Ali al-Ali	
157	Deir ez-Zor	A	Ibtisam al-Taha al-Husseini	
158	Deir ez-Zor	A	Tariq Safif	
159	Deir ez-Zor	A	Fayyad Murair	
160	Deir ez-Zor	A	Ghassan al-Abd al-Rajab	
161	Deir ez-Zor	A	Mujhim al-Muhammad al-Dandil	
162	Deir ez-Zor	A	Jarad al-Khalaf	
163	Deir ez-Zor	B	Badi' al-Hazzaa al-Ali	
164	Deir ez-Zor	B	Abd al-Jabbar al-Mardoud	
165	Deir ez-Zor	B	Ahmad al-Fayyad	
166	Deir ez-Zor	B	Ammash Jdeia	Ba'ath Party
167	Deir ez-Zor	B	Abboud al-Hafl	Independent
168	Al-Hasakah	A	Mahmoud al-Hassan	Ba'ath Party
169	Al-Hasakah	A	Muhammad al-Ali	
170	Al-Hasakah	A	Suleiman al-Janaa	
171	Al-Hasakah	A	Ahmad al-Abdallah	
172	Al-Hasakah	A	Abd al-Majid Hassan	
173	Al-Hasakah	A	Malak Hanna	
174	Al-Hasakah	B	Muhammad Haitham Dweihi	
175	Al-Hasakah	B	Khalaf al-Azzawi	
176	Al-Hasakah	B	Sameera Jibrail	
177	Al-Hasakah	B	Abd al-Wahhab al-Issa	
178	Al-Hasakah	B	Abd al-Rahman Issa	
179	Daraa	A	Dheeb al-Hariri	
180	Daraa	A	Awda al-Qassis	
181	Daraa	A	Mahmoud al-Nabulsi	
182	Daraa	A	Youssef al-Khalil	
183	Daraa	B	Mahmoud al-Zoubi	Ba'ath Party
184	Daraa	B	Fawziya al-Qatifan	
185	Daraa	B	Muhammad Zabout	
186	Daraa	B	Ahmad al-Masalmeh	
187	Suwayda	A	Salam al-Yassin	
188	Suwayda	A	Sharif Hudayfa	
189	Suwayda	A	Yahya Amer	
190	Suwayda	B	Hassan Jarbu	
191	Suwayda	B	Fendi al-Atrash	
192	Quneitra	A	Aref Haj Youssef	
193	Quneitra	A	Shakib Abu Jabal	
194	Quneitra	B	Marai Asaad al-Abboud	
195	Quneitra	B	Yassin Sweid	

== By-elections ==
Electoral district	Date	Previous incumbent	Party	Winner	Party	Cause
Deir ez-Zor	29 April 1988	Abboud al-Hafl	Independent	Khalil al-Hafl	Independent	Death.
Aleppo	1988			Muhammad Mamoun Taloustan		Death.
