= List of members of the People's Assembly (Syria), 1977–1981 =

This is a list of members elected to the 2nd People's Assembly, following the 1977 parliamentary election.

== Members ==
No.	Electoral district	Sector	Name	Party
1	Damascus	A	Mahmoud Hadid	Ba'ath Party
2	Damascus	A	Muhammad Thabit Muhayni	
3	Damascus	A	Muhammad Hisham al-Sati	
4	Damascus	A	Muhammad Said al-Hamwi	
5	Damascus	A	Abd al-Razzaq Aqbiq	
6	Damascus	A	Mahmoud Salama	
7	Damascus	A	Mahmoud Bakri Aloussi	
8	Damascus	A	Ibrahim Bakkari	
9	Damascus	B	Muhammad Marwan Sheikho	
10	Damascus	B	Muhammad Ali al-Halabi	Ba'ath Party
11	Damascus	B	Khaldoun al-Maleh	
12	Damascus	B	Muhammad al-Amadi	
13	Damascus	B	Zuhair Urabi	
14	Damascus	B	Hajar Sadiq	
15	Damascus	B	Ghassan Shalhoub	
16	Damascus	B	Hasan Jumaa	
17	Damascus	B	Rida Esfahani	
18	Damascus	B	Tahsin al-Safadi	
19	Damascus	B	Youssef Khoury	
20	Damascus	B	Muhammad Saleha	
21	Damascus	B	Muhammad Hadi Aqbiq	
22	Damascus	B	Safwan al-Qudsi	Arab Socialist Union Party
23	Rif Dimashq	A	Muhammad Eid Ajana	
24	Rif Dimashq	A	Diyaa al-Hajj Ali	
25	Rif Dimashq	A	Mustafa al-Arr	
26	Rif Dimashq	A	Muhammad Khair Soufan	
27	Rif Dimashq	A	Omar al-Saqqa	
28	Rif Dimashq	A	Aziz Karbouj	
29	Rif Dimashq	A	Mahmoud Khattab	
30	Rif Dimashq	A	Hassan Houriyeh	
31	Rif Dimashq	B	Muhammad Wafiq Arnous	
32	Rif Dimashq	B	Ahmad Qablan	
33	Rif Dimashq	B	Sobhi Ayoun	
34	Rif Dimashq	B	Salah Darwish	
35	Rif Dimashq	B	Ahmad Dibin	
36	Rif Dimashq	B	Abd al-Majid al-Tajjar	
37	Rif Dimashq	B	Ali Melhem	
38	Aleppo	A	Abd al-Wahhab al-Hassan	
39	Aleppo	A	Hussein Abu Amsha	
40	Aleppo	A	Sobhi Sheikhouni	
41	Aleppo	A	Ali Teljebini	
42	Aleppo	A	Abboud Haddad	
43	Aleppo	A	Rajab al-Manla	
44	Aleppo	B	Muhammad Adel Jamous	
45	Aleppo	B	Muhammad Dhafer Khairallah	
46	Aleppo	B	Tarif Kayyali	
47	Aleppo	B	Ali Rida	
48	Aleppo	B	Ahmad Hawi	
49	Aleppo	B	Nader Mohsen	
50	Aleppo	B	Omar al-Sibai	Syrian Communist Party
51	Aleppo	B	Abdallah Mousalli	
52	Aleppo	B	Albert Hanna Abdallah	
53	Aleppo	B	Grigor Ablighatian	
54	Districts of Aleppo Governorate	A	Diab al-Mashi	Independent
55	Districts of Aleppo Governorate	A	Muhammad al-Muhammad al-Jassem	
56	Districts of Aleppo Governorate	A	Muhammad Nour Jneidan	
57	Districts of Aleppo Governorate	A	Ahmad Tajer	
58	Districts of Aleppo Governorate	A	Taha al-Ghabash	
59	Districts of Aleppo Governorate	A	Muhammad Murad	
60	Districts of Aleppo Governorate	A	Mustafa al-Hajj Mousa	
61	Districts of Aleppo Governorate	A	Rashid Muhammad	
62	Districts of Aleppo Governorate	A	Othman Diri	
63	Districts of Aleppo Governorate	A	Wahid Abu Ras	
64	Districts of Aleppo Governorate	A	Wahid Mustafa	
65	Districts of Aleppo Governorate	A	Hamdo al-Najjar	
66	Districts of Aleppo Governorate	A	Hammadin Hammadin	
67	Districts of Aleppo Governorate	B	Muhammad al-Abdallah al-Jumaa	
68	Districts of Aleppo Governorate	B	Ismat Ghabari	
69	Districts of Aleppo Governorate	B	Ahmad al-Shihabi	
70	Districts of Aleppo Governorate	B	Omar al-Ibrahim Muhammad	
71	Districts of Aleppo Governorate	B	Ali Hussein al-Ali	
72	Districts of Aleppo Governorate	B	Ibrahim al-Othman	
73	Districts of Aleppo Governorate	B	Khalil al-Khalil	
74	Districts of Aleppo Governorate	B	Muhammad Fawzi Ibrahim	
75	Districts of Aleppo Governorate	B	Ahmad Disho	
76	Districts of Aleppo Governorate	B	Mahmoud Kallou	
77	Districts of Aleppo Governorate	B	Muhammad Sheikh Ismail	
78	Districts of Aleppo Governorate	B	Muhammad Hamdi al-Arab	
79	Homs	A	Idris Abbas	
80	Homs	A	Abd al-Razzaq Ayyoub	
81	Homs	A	Ali Idris	
82	Homs	A	Marwan al-Saleh	
83	Homs	A	Adham al-Rajab	
84	Homs	A	Nur al-Din Khaddour	
85	Homs	A	Nazih Said	
86	Homs	A	Abd al-Aziz al-Mulhim	Ba'ath Party
87	Homs	A	Ghalib al-Najib	
88	Homs	B	Ali Abbas	
89	Homs	B	Shaban Shahin	
90	Homs	B	Shakir Barghout	
91	Homs	B	Mikit Anini	
92	Homs	B	Mahmoud Mallouk	
93	Homs	B	Maurice Salibi	Syrian Communist Party
94	Homs	B	Muhammad Abu al-Nour Tayyara	
95	Homs	B	Abd al-Majid Tarabulsi	
96	Homs	B	Tawfiq al-Naqri	
97	Hama	A	Ibrahim Haydar	
98	Hama	A	Khalil Mahfoud	
99	Hama	A	Rashid Issa	
100	Hama	A	Abd al-Karim Maat al-Ismail	
101	Hama	A	Abd al-Mu'in Fatraoui	
102	Hama	A	Mustafa Shakoush	
103	Hama	A	Mustafa Halabiya	
104	Hama	A	Mahmoud Khairbek	
105	Hama	A	Muhammad Jumaa Taftanazi	
106	Hama	A	Yahya Ardouk	
107	Hama	B	Hamed Hassan	
108	Hama	B	Souad al-Sheikh Bakkour	
109	Hama	B	Abd al-Ilah Hawwat	
110	Hama	B	Aziz Yaqub	
111	Hama	B	Ali Nabhan	
112	Hama	B	Abd al-Majid al-Zaeem	
113	Hama	B	Irfan Alloush	
114	Latakia	A	Tawfiq Darwish	
115	Latakia	A	Nasr Saqour	
116	Latakia	A	Ahmad Madaniyya	
117	Latakia	A	Muhammad Jaafar	
118	Latakia	A	Hassan Abu Zaid	
119	Latakia	A	Mahmoud Ajil	
120	Latakia	A	Ahmad Darji	
121	Latakia	B	Jamil al-Assad	Ba'ath Party
122	Latakia	B	Ghazi Khadra	
123	Latakia	B	Suleiman Saqr	
124	Latakia	B	Faisal Summaq	
125	Latakia	B	Ahmad Abu Musa	
126	Latakia	B	Abdallah Zaitoun	
127	Idlib	A	Khalid al-Khader	
128	Idlib	A	Muhammad Istanbuli	
129	Idlib	A	Ahmad al-Hajj Youssef	
130	Idlib	A	Muhammad Kharboutli	
131	Idlib	A	Muhammad Haj Ayyoub	
132	Idlib	A	Abd al-Muti Abd al-Qadir	
133	Idlib	A	Nasr al-Yousef	
134	Idlib	A	Ahmad Eid al-Ahmad	
135	Idlib	A	Muhammad Latouf	
136	Idlib	B	Muhammad Nadhir Dweidri	
137	Idlib	B	Ismail al-Yousefi	
138	Idlib	B	Abd al-Aziz Diab	
139	Idlib	B	Muhammad Hisham Saifo	
140	Idlib	B	Ala al-Din Hamama	
141	Tartus	A	Muhammad Mayhoub	
142	Tartus	A	Aziz Suleiman	
143	Tartus	A	Issa Khaddour	
144	Tartus	A	Marwan al-Hamwi	
145	Tartus	A	Issa al-Khoury	
146	Tartus	B	Muhsen Bilal	Ba'ath Party
147	Tartus	B	Sulafa Deeb	
148	Tartus	B	Hamid al-Mahmoud	
149	Tartus	B	Najm al-Din al-Saleh	
150	Tartus	B	Muharram Tayyara	
151	Raqqa	A	Ismail Ubaid	
152	Raqqa	A	Ibrahim al-Hunaidi	
153	Raqqa	A	Mustafa al-Ayed	
154	Raqqa	B	Abd al-Razzaq al-Othman	
155	Raqqa	B	Abd al-Razzaq al-Huwaidi	
156	Raqqa	B	Mustafa al-Abdallah al-Alawi	
157	Deir ez-Zor	A	Mohsen al-Mazid	
158	Deir ez-Zor	A	Hassan al-Ashish	
159	Deir ez-Zor	A	Jarad al-Khalaf	
160	Deir ez-Zor	A	Zoubaa al-Akala	
161	Deir ez-Zor	A	Faisal al-Najras	
162	Deir ez-Zor	A	Suleiman al-Hassan	
163	Deir ez-Zor	B	Abboud al-Hafl	
164	Deir ez-Zor	B	Shukriya Abd al-Ghani	
165	Deir ez-Zor	B	Fawzi al-Qanbar	
166	Deir ez-Zor	B	Jumaa al-Abdoun	
167	Deir ez-Zor	B	Rayyis al-Fayyad	
168	Al-Hasakah	A	Abd al-Latif al-Ali	
169	Al-Hasakah	A	Muhammad al-Ali	
170	Al-Hasakah	A	Muhammad al-Hawar	
171	Al-Hasakah	A	Maktaa Twaisan	
172	Al-Hasakah	A	Yassin al-Khalaf	
173	Al-Hasakah	A	Hussein al-Omar	
174	Al-Hasakah	B	Abd al-Aziz al-Nuaimi	
175	Al-Hasakah	B	Farah al-Taan	
176	Al-Hasakah	B	Yaqub Halawaji	
177	Al-Hasakah	B	Abboud Khalif Majoul	
178	Al-Hasakah	B	Boghos Siraj	
179	Daraa	A	Shahira Fallouh	
180	Daraa	A	Shafiq Wahdan	
181	Daraa	A	Muhammad al-Rashid Abazaid	
182	Daraa	A	Mahmoud Abu Rumiya al-Saadi	
183	Daraa	B	Ibrahim al-Zoubi	
184	Daraa	B	Said Suleiman	
185	Daraa	B	Muhammad Said Twaisan	
186	Daraa	B	Nayef al-Taani	
187	Suwayda	A	Shibli Nasr	
188	Suwayda	A	Nayef al-Halabi	
189	Suwayda	A	Jamal Abd al-Din	
190	Suwayda	B	Turki Shalhub	
191	Suwayda	B	Asaad Harb	
192	Quneitra	A	Aref Hamdan	
193	Quneitra	A	Mahmoud Maryoud	
194	Quneitra	B	Fuad Deeb	
195	Quneitra	B	Ismail al-Said	

== By-elections ==
Electoral district	Date	Previous incumbent	Party	Winner	Party	Cause
Suwayda	9 May 1980	Turki Shalhoub		Said al-Salman		Death.
