= List of members of the People's Assembly (Syria), 1990–1994 =

This is a list of members elected to the 5th People's Assembly, following the 1990 parliamentary election.

== Members ==
No.	Electoral district	Sector	Name	Party
1	Damascus	A	Muhammad Misbah Baghdadi	
2	Damascus	A	Farouk Thuraya	
3	Damascus	A	Bashira Tawakkalna	
4	Damascus	A	Wissal Farha	
5	Damascus	A	Abd al-Qadir Qaddura	Ba'ath Party
6	Damascus	A	Abd al-Razzaq Aqbiq	
7	Damascus	A	Muhammad Marwan Sheikho	
8	Damascus	A	Ahmad Haidar	
9	Damascus	A	Basil Dahdouh	
10	Damascus	A	Mahmoud Salama	
11	Damascus	B	Muhammad Amin Abu al-Shamat	
12	Damascus	B	Ahmad al-Ghafri	
13	Damascus	B	Elias Najmeh	
14	Damascus	B	Muhammad Shakir Asaid	
15	Damascus	B	Ali al-Turkmeni	
16	Damascus	B	Muhammad Fuad al-Asha	
17	Damascus	B	Abdallah Talaba	
18	Damascus	B	Ferial Muhayni	
19	Damascus	B	Amal Dakkak	
20	Damascus	B	Muhammad Munir Rihawi	
21	Damascus	B	Badi' Fallaheh	
22	Damascus	B	Baha al-Din al-Hassan	Independent
23	Damascus	B	Muhammad Ihsan Sanqar	
24	Damascus	B	Mahmoud Jabr	
25	Damascus	B	Mahmoud Alousi	
26	Damascus	B	Muhammad Mamoun al-Homsi	
27	Damascus	B	Muhyi al-Din Jumaa	
28	Damascus	B	Muhammad Zuhair al-Awa	
29	Damascus	B	Colette Khoury	Independent
30	Rif Dimashq	A	Hamdan Khashini	
31	Rif Dimashq	A	Zakiya Masarra	
32	Rif Dimashq	A	Hilal Rizq	
33	Rif Dimashq	A	Mahmoud al-Buqaai	
34	Rif Dimashq	A	Muhammad Shaddad	
35	Rif Dimashq	A	Zaher Abu Khalif	
36	Rif Dimashq	A	Muhammad Akram Zeidan	
37	Rif Dimashq	A	Hind Hatitani	
38	Rif Dimashq	A	Aziz Karbouj	
39	Rif Dimashq	A	Omar Aybour	
40	Rif Dimashq	B	Abd al-Hafiz al-Qalsh	
41	Rif Dimashq	B	Amin Hayrab	
42	Rif Dimashq	B	Youssef Jaidani	
43	Rif Dimashq	B	Abdo Qasim	
44	Rif Dimashq	B	Mustafa Awwad al-Rifai	
45	Rif Dimashq	B	Ali Qabalan	
46	Rif Dimashq	B	Abd al-Rahman al-Ahmar	
47	Rif Dimashq	B	Muhammad Abd al-Azim	
48	Rif Dimashq	B	Emile al-Anini	
49	Aleppo	A	Ahmad Tawfiq Qarna	
50	Aleppo	A	Ahmad al-Labid	
51	Aleppo	A	Darwish Darwish	
52	Aleppo	A	Muhammad Fateh Hamwi	
53	Aleppo	A	Manar Nattour	
54	Aleppo	A	Ahmad Muwalidi	
55	Aleppo	A	Muhammad Ali Shuwayhina	
56	Aleppo	B	Hussein Kaaka	
57	Aleppo	B	Ala al-Din Zaitoun	
58	Aleppo	B	Ahmad Eido	
59	Aleppo	B	Layla al-Turkmani	
60	Aleppo	B	Omar Wasfi Martini	
61	Aleppo	B	Muhammad Marwan Saqqal	
62	Aleppo	B	Mustafa Sukari	
63	Aleppo	B	Jurji Azar	
64	Aleppo	B	Ahmad Badr al-Din Hassoun	Independent
65	Aleppo	B	Muhammad Adel Jamous	
66	Aleppo	B	Muhammad Adel Houri	
67	Aleppo	B	Abd al-Aziz al-Shami	
68	Aleppo	B	Ibrahim Azzouz	
69	Districts of Aleppo Governorate	A	Muhammad al-Hussein al-Ibrahim	
70	Districts of Aleppo Governorate	A	Nur al-Huda Ahmad Khallu	
71	Districts of Aleppo Governorate	A	Hassan Haji Mahmoud	
72	Districts of Aleppo Governorate	A	Abd al-Hamid al-Dibo	
73	Districts of Aleppo Governorate	A	Muhammad Aqil Hussein Agha	
74	Districts of Aleppo Governorate	A	Wahid Abu Ras	
75	Districts of Aleppo Governorate	A	Jassem al-Ibrahim	
76	Districts of Aleppo Governorate	A	Issa al-Zamel	
77	Districts of Aleppo Governorate	A	Muhammad Qazan	
78	Districts of Aleppo Governorate	A	Sami al-Shihabi	
79	Districts of Aleppo Governorate	A	Ibrahim Othman	
80	Districts of Aleppo Governorate	A	Othman Suleiman	
81	Districts of Aleppo Governorate	A	Medhat Mulla Qol Aghasi	
82	Districts of Aleppo Governorate	A	Hikmat Ibrahim	
83	Districts of Aleppo Governorate	A	Diab al-Mashi	Independent
84	Districts of Aleppo Governorate	A	Muhammad Said Youssef	
85	Districts of Aleppo Governorate	A	Husni Hassan	
86	Districts of Aleppo Governorate	B	Muhammad Rahhal	
87	Districts of Aleppo Governorate	B	Muhammad al-Hassan	
88	Districts of Aleppo Governorate	B	Abd al-Razzaq Hamdou al-Sheihan	
89	Districts of Aleppo Governorate	B	Ahmad al-Said	
90	Districts of Aleppo Governorate	B	Mustafa al-Ali	
91	Districts of Aleppo Governorate	B	Salem Karim al-Hamada	
92	Districts of Aleppo Governorate	B	Abd al-Rahman Nasser	
93	Districts of Aleppo Governorate	B	Battal Battal	
94	Districts of Aleppo Governorate	B	Ahmad Issa Muhammad	
95	Districts of Aleppo Governorate	B	Junaid Tajer	
96	Districts of Aleppo Governorate	B	Fadel Kanno	
97	Districts of Aleppo Governorate	B	Youssef Youssef Tarboush	
98	Districts of Aleppo Governorate	B	Abd al-Hamid al-Ghabari	Independent
99	Districts of Aleppo Governorate	B	Abd al-Rahman Aibo	
100	Districts of Aleppo Governorate	B	Mustafa al-Muhammad	
101	Homs	A	Marwan Houriyeh	
102	Homs	A	Mahmoud al-Diab	
103	Homs	A	Elias al-Lati	
104	Homs	A	Huda al-Kurdi	
105	Homs	A	Mustafa al-Issa	
106	Homs	A	Haydar Abbas	
107	Homs	A	Jumaa al-Hamoud	
108	Homs	A	Abd al-Aziz al-Mulhim	Ba'ath Party
109	Homs	A	Nazih Said	
110	Homs	A	Mahmoud al-Fadous	Independent
111	Homs	A	Ahmad Darbouli	
112	Homs	B	Hikmat al-Khouli	
113	Homs	B	Muhammad Yasser al-Saqqa	
114	Homs	B	Mahmoud Marouf	
115	Homs	B	Muhammad Ghazi Tayyara	
116	Homs	B	Mashhour Gharibeh	
117	Homs	B	Muhammad al-Aqraa	
118	Homs	B	Omar Bakkour	
119	Homs	B	Shahadeh Mayhoub	Independent
120	Homs	B	Ali al-Khoudour	
121	Homs	B	Ahmad al-Khalid	Independent
122	Homs	B	Saleh Tlass	
123	Homs	B	Bahjat Rajoub	
124	Hama	A	Hussein Murshid Hussein	
125	Hama	A	Fatima al-Saqqa	
126	Hama	A	Amin al-Bakir	
127	Hama	A	Michel Richa	
128	Hama	A	Fatima al-Jaha	
129	Hama	A	Mustafa Issa	
130	Hama	A	Ahmad al-Asaad	
131	Hama	A	Mahmoud Hammoud	
132	Hama	A	Ibrahim Haydar	
133	Hama	A	Hussein Muhammad al-Hussein	
134	Hama	A	Abd al-Karim al-Ismail	Independent
135	Hama	A	Mazoud al-Jassem	
136	Hama	A	Mujib Salama	
137	Hama	B	Walid Hamdoun	
138	Hama	B	Walid Jad'an	
139	Hama	B	Muhammad Shams al-Din Qanout	
140	Hama	B	Ahmad al-Ali	
141	Hama	B	Muhammad Adnan Suleiman	
142	Hama	B	Ibrahim Zaarour	
143	Hama	B	Hassan Sabbahi	
144	Hama	B	Louay al-Hilu	
145	Hama	B	Ahmad al-Khattab	
146	Latakia	A	Tawfiq Ibrahim	
147	Latakia	A	Rafiq Darwish	
148	Latakia	A	Suhail Kanaan	
149	Latakia	A	Layla Ghalawenji	
150	Latakia	A	Tawfiq Darwish	
151	Latakia	A	Mahmoud Ajil	
152	Latakia	A	Mustafa Abd al-Halim	
153	Latakia	A	Bahjat Saad	
154	Latakia	A	Ibrahim al-Lawza	
155	Latakia	B	Jamil al-Assad	Ba'ath Party
156	Latakia	B	Ahmad Abu Musa	
157	Latakia	B	Muhammad Saad	
158	Latakia	B	Adnan Khuzeim	
159	Latakia	B	Sari Haddad	
160	Latakia	B	Basil Youssef	
161	Latakia	B	Muhammad Ali Nasser	
162	Latakia	B	Fayez Othman	
163	Idlib	A	Abd al-Razzaq al-Tanari	
164	Idlib	A	Muhammad Nadhir Dweidri	
165	Idlib	A	Muhammad Fran	
166	Idlib	A	Bashira Hamed	
167	Idlib	A	Tawfiq al-Ibrahim	
168	Idlib	A	Nahida Qassas	
169	Idlib	A	Ahmad Salem	
170	Idlib	A	Mahmoud Haj Ahmad	
171	Idlib	A	Khalid al-Khader	
172	Idlib	A	Muhammad al-Sayyid	
173	Idlib	A	Walid Sardini	
174	Idlib	A	Muhammad Abd al-Rahman	
175	Idlib	B	Ahmad al-Gharib	
176	Idlib	B	Ahmad Riyad	
177	Idlib	B	Muhammad Nihad Mishantat	
178	Idlib	B	Muhammad Latouf	
179	Idlib	B	Riyad Naasan Agha	
180	Idlib	B	Muhammad al-Abdallah	
181	Tartus	A	Abd al-Latif Mahrez	
182	Tartus	A	Nadim al-Kanj	
183	Tartus	A	Izz al-Din al-Nasser	
184	Tartus	A	Muhammad Ghassan Tayyara	
185	Tartus	A	Abd al-Munim Bayasi	
186	Tartus	A	Yahya al-Khaddam	
187	Tartus	B	Jamila Ali	
188	Tartus	B	Muhammad Zugheibi	
189	Tartus	B	Suleiman Khaddour	
190	Tartus	B	Najm al-Din al-Saleh	
191	Tartus	B	Nazih Bashour	
192	Tartus	B	Ali Dawoud	
193	Tartus	B	Mohsen Imran	
194	Raqqa	A	Abd al-Fattah al-Jumaa	
195	Raqqa	A	Mustafa al-Ayed	
196	Raqqa	A	Muhammad Anwar al-Dibs	
197	Raqqa	A	Abd al-Razzaq al-Eid	
198	Raqqa	B	Ismail Abd al-Ghani	
199	Raqqa	B	Zakariya al-Hassan	
200	Raqqa	B	Najwa al-Ajeili	
201	Raqqa	B	Muhammad al-Qammash	
202	Deir ez-Zor	A	Zahra al-Jassem	
203	Deir ez-Zor	A	Fayyad Murair	
204	Deir ez-Zor	A	Abd al-Jabbar al-Mardoud	
205	Deir ez-Zor	A	Ahmad al-Hammad	
206	Deir ez-Zor	A	Ghassan al-Abd al-Rajab	
207	Deir ez-Zor	A	Najm al-Abdallah	
208	Deir ez-Zor	A	Jassem al-Assad	
209	Deir ez-Zor	A	Abd al-Aziz al-Hamada	
210	Deir ez-Zor	B	Nawaf al-Bashir	
211	Deir ez-Zor	B	Zuhair al-Hamdi	
212	Deir ez-Zor	B	Ahmad al-Fayyad	
213	Deir ez-Zor	B	Riyad al-Abdallah	
214	Deir ez-Zor	B	Khalil al-Hafl	Independent
215	Deir ez-Zor	B	Hamad Sheikh al-Jilayat	
216	Al-Hasakah	A	Mahmoud al-Fadel	
217	Al-Hasakah	A	Hamad al-Suhaian	
218	Al-Hasakah	A	Ahmad al-Abdallah	
219	Al-Hasakah	A	Ibrahim Abdallah	
220	Al-Hasakah	A	Mahmoud al-Hassan	Ba'ath Party
221	Al-Hasakah	A	Mahmoud Dawoud	
222	Al-Hasakah	A	Fuad Aliko	
223	Al-Hasakah	A	Mahmoud al-Boursan	
224	Al-Hasakah	B	Elias Abd Laki	
225	Al-Hasakah	B	Sameera Jibrail	
226	Al-Hasakah	B	Muhammad Haitham Dweihi	
227	Al-Hasakah	B	Kamal Darwish	
228	Al-Hasakah	B	Abd al-Hamid Haj Mousa	
229	Al-Hasakah	B	Bashir Saadi	
230	Daraa	A	Mahmoud al-Zoubi	Ba'ath Party
231	Daraa	A	Najah Mahamid	
232	Daraa	A	Dheeb al-Hariri	
233	Daraa	A	Awda al-Qassis	
234	Daraa	A	Youssef Abu Roumiya al-Saadi	Independent
235	Daraa	B	Abd al-Fattah al-Ibrahim	
236	Daraa	B	Abd al-Fattah al-Labbad	
237	Daraa	B	Muhammad Oqab	
238	Daraa	B	Ghassan Abazaid	
239	Daraa	B	Shafiq al-Hariri	
240	Suwayda	A	Muhanna al-Tawil	
241	Suwayda	A	Muayyad Subh	
242	Suwayda	A	Salam al-Yassin	
243	Suwayda	A	Abdallah al-Atrash	
244	Suwayda	B	Kamal Amer	Independent
245	Suwayda	B	Hassan Jarbu	
246	Quneitra	A	Abd al-Majid al-Faouri	
247	Quneitra	A	Shakib Abu Jabal	
248	Quneitra	A	Radwan al-Tahhan	
249	Quneitra	B	Mohsen Ali	
250	Quneitra	B	Aref Haj Youssef	

== By-elections ==
Electoral district	Date	Previous incumbent	Party	Winner	Party	Cause
Daraa	1991	Dheeb al-Hariri		Ibrahim al-Issa		Death.
Aleppo	22 May 1992	Muhammad Fateh Hamwi		Grigor Ablighatian		Death.
Districts of Aleppo Governorate	1993	Hikmat Ibrahim		Mahmoud Abd al-Hadi		Death.
Daraa	28 January 1994	Muhammad Oqab		Qassem al-Rabdawi		Death.
