= List of members of the People's Assembly (Syria), 1973–1977 =

This is a list of members elected to the 1st People's Assembly, following the 1973 parliamentary election.

== Members ==
No.	Electoral district	Sector	Name	Party
1	Damascus	A	Mahmoud Hadid	Ba'ath Party
2	Damascus	A	Maamun al-Khayyat	
3	Damascus	A	Muhammad Said al-Hamawi	
4	Damascus	A	Muhammad Sayyah al-Suruji	
5	Damascus	A	Muhammad Arabi Sahyun	
6	Damascus	A	Mahmoud Bakri Aloussi	
7	Damascus	A	Haydar Mardini	
8	Damascus	A	Youssef Nimr	
9	Damascus	B	Mahmoud al-Ayyubi	Ba'ath Party
10	Damascus	B	Muhammad Marwan Sheikho	
11	Damascus	B	Muhammad Ali al-Halabi	Ba'ath Party
12	Damascus	B	Muhammad Zuhayr al-Awa	
13	Damascus	B	Hajar Sadiq	
14	Damascus	B	Anwar Kamil	
15	Damascus	B	Muhammad Adnan Kilani	
16	Damascus	B	Riyad al-Abid	
17	Damascus	B	Hasan Jumaa	
18	Damascus	B	Tahsin al-Safadi	
19	Damascus	B	Ghassan Shalhub	
20	Damascus	B	Khalid Bakdash	Syrian Communist Party
21	Damascus	B	Hani al-Rumani	
22	Damascus	B	Jurji al-Khoury	
23	Rif Dimashq	A	Suleiman Musa	
24	Rif Dimashq	A	Diyaa Ali	
25	Rif Dimashq	A	Yasin Rabaa	
26	Rif Dimashq	A	Hammud Diab	
27	Rif Dimashq	A	Abdu al-Shaqi	
28	Rif Dimashq	A	Mahmoud Khattab	
29	Rif Dimashq	A	Aziz Karbouj	
30	Rif Dimashq	A	Muhammad Youssef	
31	Rif Dimashq	B	Ahmad Qablan	
32	Rif Dimashq	B	Muhammad Wafiq Arnous	
33	Rif Dimashq	B	Muhammad al-Masri	
34	Rif Dimashq	B	Bushra Kanafani	
35	Rif Dimashq	B	Ahmad Dabin	
36	Rif Dimashq	B	Abd al-Majid al-Tajjar	
37	Rif Dimashq	B	Muhammad Subhi Taha	
38	Aleppo		Abd al-Majid Nasir	
39	Aleppo		Muhammad Subhi Sheikhuni	
40	Aleppo		Muhammad Fateh Hamwi	
41	Aleppo		Surur Yazji	
42	Aleppo		Leon Ghazal	
43	Aleppo		Abdul Karim Azizi	
44	Aleppo		Ibrahim al-Salqini	
45	Aleppo		Muhammad Adel Jamous	
46	Aleppo		Muhammad Adil Haj Murad	
47	Aleppo		Muhammad Bahjat Maslati	
48	Aleppo		Muhammad Zayn al-Abidin Khairallah	
49	Aleppo		Badr al-Din Quja	
50	Aleppo		Omar al-Sibai	Syrian Communist Party
51	Aleppo		Muhammad Adib Nahwi	
52	Aleppo		Abdallah Mousalli	
53	Aleppo		Ahmad Hafyan	
54	Districts of Aleppo Governorate		Ahmad Dashu	
55	Districts of Aleppo Governorate		Muhammad Said al-Hakim	
56	Districts of Aleppo Governorate		Hasan al-Ghannam	
57	Districts of Aleppo Governorate		Mustafa Hamoush	
58	Districts of Aleppo Governorate		Abd al-Razzaq Abdi	
59	Districts of Aleppo Governorate		Mahmoud al-Jaffal	
60	Districts of Aleppo Governorate		Muhammad Assani	
61	Districts of Aleppo Governorate		Zakariya Ali	
62	Districts of Aleppo Governorate		Muhammad al-Muhammad al-Jasim	
63	Districts of Aleppo Governorate		Diab al-Mashi	Independent
64	Districts of Aleppo Governorate		Ibrahim Abdul Hanan Zamil	
65	Districts of Aleppo Governorate		Wahid Mustafa	
66	Districts of Aleppo Governorate		Ismail al-Youssefi	
67	Districts of Aleppo Governorate		Abdul Qadir Nana	
68	Districts of Aleppo Governorate		Zakariya al-Darir	
69	Districts of Aleppo Governorate		Muhammad Fahim al-Razuq	
70	Districts of Aleppo Governorate		Muhammad Khayr Alitu	
71	Districts of Aleppo Governorate		Abdullah Dirgham	
72	Districts of Aleppo Governorate		Muhammad Faiq Haj Muhammad Hasan	
73	Districts of Aleppo Governorate		Kanu Ahmad	
74	Districts of Aleppo Governorate		Ismat Ghabari	
75	Districts of Aleppo Governorate		Mahmoud Fayez al-Labni	
76	Districts of Aleppo Governorate		Farouq al-Jasim	
77	Homs		Abd al-Latif Ismail	
78	Homs		Ali Idris	
79	Homs		Abd al-Aziz al-Shafi	
80	Homs		Ali Haydar	
81	Homs		Mahmoud al-Ramadan	
82	Homs		Afif Khuzam	
83	Homs		Bissam al-Fayyad	
84	Homs		Ali Hilal	
85	Homs		Ahmad Talib	
86	Homs		Tawfiq al-Naqri	
87	Homs		Abd al-Nafi' al-Sibai	
88	Homs		Said al-Sutli	
89	Homs		Fuad Yazji	
90	Homs		Muhammad Mahmoud	
91	Homs		Adnan al-Musalli	
92	Homs		Muhammad Nuri al-Rifai	
93	Homs		Philip Kaba	
94	Homs		Muhammad Diya Malluhi	
95	Hama		Hussein Muhammad al-Hussein	
96	Hama		George Harika	
97	Hama		Ibrahim Haydar	
98	Hama		Muhammad Jumaa Taftanazi	
99	Hama		Muhammad Eid Latmini	
100	Hama		Mahmoud Khairbek	
101	Hama		Mustafa al-Hamud	
102	Hama		Rashid Issa	
103	Hama		Abd al-Salam al-Qasim	
104	Hama		Muhammad Wahud	
105	Hama		Abd al-Ilah Hawwat	
106	Hama		Fayez Issa	
107	Hama		Munawwer Makhlouta	
108	Hama		Ali Nabhan	
109	Hama		Yahya Ardouk	
110	Hama		Mahmoud Arwani	
111	Latakia		Ahmad Adhima	
112	Latakia		Jurji Khoury	
113	Latakia		Abd al-Khalq Hajuz	
114	Latakia		Abdullah Banshi	
115	Latakia		Abd al-Karim Ammar	
116	Latakia		Mahmoud Ajil	
117	Latakia		Mahmoud Musa	
118	Latakia		Ahmad Khaddur	
119	Latakia		Jamil al-Assad	Ba'ath Party
120	Latakia		Salma Najib	
121	Latakia		Ghazi Khadra	
122	Latakia		Muhammad Naasan Deeb	
123	Latakia		Muhammad Kahila	
124	Idlib		Khalid al-Khader	
125	Idlib		Nur al-Din Najm	
126	Idlib		Muhammad Haj Hamud	
127	Idlib		Muhammad Abd al-Rahman Anis	
128	Idlib		Abd al-Karim al-Hilal	
129	Idlib		Muhammad Salah al-Din Hawwa	
130	Idlib		Abd al-Muti Abd al-Qadir	
131	Idlib		Muhammad Istanbuli	
132	Idlib		Fahmi al-Youssefi	
133	Idlib		Adil Hussein	
134	Idlib		Abd al-Aziz Diab	
135	Idlib		Muhammad Nadhir Dweidri	
136	Idlib		Muhammad Riyad Majni	
137	Tartus		Mahmoud Hasan	
138	Tartus		Iskandar Ataki	
139	Tartus		Issa Khaddour	
140	Tartus		Ali Ahmad Ali	
141	Tartus		Michel Jurjus	
142	Tartus		Ali al-Zaza	
143	Tartus		Sarem Youssef	
144	Tartus		Muharram Tayyara	
145	Tartus		Ahmad Harfush	
146	Tartus		Hanaa al-Hamwi	
147	Raqqa		Jasim al-Muhaymid al-Huwaydi	
148	Raqqa		Umar al-Hajj Abd	
149	Raqqa		Muhammad Salah al-Sukhni	
150	Raqqa		Khalid al-Hamud	
151	Raqqa		Hussein Hamid al-Ajili	
152	Deir ez-Zor		Abd Allah al-Rawi	
153	Deir ez-Zor		Hasan al-Umr al-Ali	
154	Deir ez-Zor		Anam Abdullah al-Hijr	
155	Deir ez-Zor		Adnan al-Juma	
156	Deir ez-Zor		Suleiman Uthman al-Akla	
157	Deir ez-Zor		Rayyis al-Fayyad	
158	Deir ez-Zor		Qusay al-Sheikh	
159	Deir ez-Zor		Abd al-Aziz Ayash	
160	Deir ez-Zor		Fu'ad al-Yasin	
161	Deir ez-Zor		Sallum al-Abdullah	
162	Al-Hasakah		Khidr al-Ali	
163	Al-Hasakah		Hussein al-Judan	
164	Al-Hasakah		Muhammad al-Ali	
165	Al-Hasakah		Othman Muhammad	
166	Al-Hasakah		Mahmoud al-Fadil	
167	Al-Hasakah		Hanna Jurjur	
168	Al-Hasakah		Farid Barsum	
169	Al-Hasakah		Abdullah al-Suwailih	
170	Al-Hasakah		Khalaf al-Azzawi	
171	Al-Hasakah		Suleiman Hajju	
172	Daraa		Ibrahim al-Ali	
173	Daraa		Mahmoud Abu Rumiya al-Saadi	
174	Daraa		Shafiq Wahdan	
175	Daraa		Muhammad al-Rashid Abazaid	
176	Daraa		Said Suleiman	
177	Daraa		Youssef al-Shuli	
178	Daraa		Ahmad al-Muhamid	
179	Suwayda		Jamil Gharz al-Din	
180	Suwayda		Nayef al-Halabi	
181	Suwayda		Jamal Heneidi	
182	Suwayda		Hussein Abu Assaf	
183	Suwayda		Moudha al-Mulhim	
184	Quneitra		Khalid al-Khalid	
185	Quneitra		Saleh al-Tahhan	
186	Quneitra		Ali Anhar Ahmad	
187	Quneitra		Sami al-Saleh	

== By-elections ==
Electoral district	Date	Previous incumbent	Party	Winner	Party	Cause
Damascus	1974	Anwar Kamil		Youssef Kamil		Death.
Hama	1974	George Harika		Michel Risha		Death.
Damascus	1975	Jurji al-Khoury		Yassin Astah		Death.
