= List of members of the People's Assembly (Syria), 1994–1998 =

This is a list of members elected to the 6th People's Assembly, following the 1994 parliamentary election.

== Members ==
No.	Electoral district	Sector	Name	Party
1	Damascus	A	Najwa Qassab Hassan	
2	Damascus	A	Abd al-Razzaq Aqbiq	
3	Damascus	A	Farouk Thuraya	
4	Damascus	A	Muhammad Misbah Baghdadi	
5	Damascus	A	Amal Dakkak	
6	Damascus	A	Abd al-Qadir Qaddura	Ba'ath Party
7	Damascus	A	Nabil Dawoud	Independent
8	Damascus	A	Muhammad Marwan Sheikho	
9	Damascus	A	Basil Dahdouh	
10	Damascus	A	Muhammad Yasser Nahlawi	
11	Damascus	B	Muhammad Shakir Asaid	
12	Damascus	B	Misbah Ghaiba	
13	Damascus	B	Elias Najmeh	
14	Damascus	B	Muhammad Fathi Qanawati	
15	Damascus	B	Mahmoud Qassouma	
16	Damascus	B	Jalal al-Din Idlibi	
17	Damascus	B	Ali al-Turkmeni	
18	Damascus	B	Ferial Muhayni	
19	Damascus	B	Muhammad Adnan al-Khatib	
20	Damascus	B	Wissal Farha	
21	Damascus	B	Riad Seif	Independent
22	Damascus	B	Muhammad Mamoun al-Homsi	
23	Damascus	B	Hashem al-Aqqad	Independent
24	Damascus	B	Baha al-Din al-Hassan	Independent
25	Damascus	B	Muhammad Ihsan Sanqar	
26	Damascus	B	Badi' Fallaheh	
27	Damascus	B	Basil Hamwi	
28	Damascus	B	Adnan al-Dakhakhni	Independent
29	Damascus	B	Colette Khoury	Independent
30	Rif Dimashq	A	Hilal Rizq	
31	Rif Dimashq	A	Omar al-Shalt	
32	Rif Dimashq	A	Zaher Abu Khalif	
33	Rif Dimashq	A	Hamdan Khashini	
34	Rif Dimashq	A	Hind Jijaan	
35	Rif Dimashq	A	Sabah Awad	
36	Rif Dimashq	A	Elias Murad	
37	Rif Dimashq	A	Muhammad Diab	
38	Rif Dimashq	A	Mahmoud Diab	
39	Rif Dimashq	A	Ali Khadra	
40	Rif Dimashq	B	Muhammad Khair al-Samal	
41	Rif Dimashq	B	Saleh al-Qadri	
42	Rif Dimashq	B	Abd al-Hafiz al-Qalsh	
43	Rif Dimashq	B	Abd al-Karim al-Khouli	
44	Rif Dimashq	B	Mustafa al-Tajjar	
45	Rif Dimashq	B	Ali Qabalan	
46	Rif Dimashq	B	Abd al-Rahman al-Ahmar	
47	Rif Dimashq	B	Ahmad al-Turk	
48	Rif Dimashq	B	Ali Melhem	
49	Aleppo	A	Rashid Akhterini	
50	Aleppo	A	Ahmad Tawfiq Qarna	
51	Aleppo	A	Ahmad Sameer al-Taqi	
52	Aleppo	A	Hassan Ghazi Turkmani	
53	Aleppo	A	Sameer Salem	
54	Aleppo	A	Simon Ibrahim	
55	Aleppo	A	Abd al-Aziz al-Shami	
56	Aleppo	B	Ahmad Qazzaz	
57	Aleppo	B	Ahmad Ayoud	
58	Aleppo	B	Farouk Ibram	
59	Aleppo	B	Jurji Azar	
60	Aleppo	B	Ferial Sattal	
61	Aleppo	B	Hussein Kaaka	
62	Aleppo	B	Muhammad Aqqad	
63	Aleppo	B	Nadia Ghazi	
64	Aleppo	B	Ahmad Badr al-Din Hassoun	Independent
65	Aleppo	B	Abdallah Mousalli	
66	Aleppo	B	Muhammad Adel Jamous	
67	Aleppo	B	Muhammad Saleh al-Mallah	Independent
68	Aleppo	B	Mahmoud Berri	
69	Districts of Aleppo Governorate	A	Abd al-Qadir Turka	
70	Districts of Aleppo Governorate	A	Issa al-Zamel	
71	Districts of Aleppo Governorate	A	Abd al-Hayy Khalid	
72	Districts of Aleppo Governorate	A	Zakariya Radwan Fakhouri	
73	Districts of Aleppo Governorate	A	Othman Sheikh Hussein	
74	Districts of Aleppo Governorate	A	Muhammad al-Sattam	
75	Districts of Aleppo Governorate	A	Zakariya al-Hassan	
76	Districts of Aleppo Governorate	A	Sami al-Shihabi	
77	Districts of Aleppo Governorate	A	Jassem al-Ibrahim	
78	Districts of Aleppo Governorate	A	Wahid Abu Ras	
79	Districts of Aleppo Governorate	A	Ahmad Khatib	
80	Districts of Aleppo Governorate	A	Abdallah Hamra	
81	Districts of Aleppo Governorate	A	Abdallah al-Shallash	
82	Districts of Aleppo Governorate	A	Muhammad Nour Jneidan	
83	Districts of Aleppo Governorate	A	Husni Hussein Haj Hamada	
84	Districts of Aleppo Governorate	A	Diab al-Mashi	Independent
85	Districts of Aleppo Governorate	A	N/A	
86	Districts of Aleppo Governorate	B	Fatinah al-Ahmad	
87	Districts of Aleppo Governorate	B	Manar Nattour	
88	Districts of Aleppo Governorate	B	Ahmad al-Said	
89	Districts of Aleppo Governorate	B	Muhammad al-Hassan	
90	Districts of Aleppo Governorate	B	Tariq Qandil	
91	Districts of Aleppo Governorate	B	Abd al-Rahman Abriq	
92	Districts of Aleppo Governorate	B	Battal Battal	
93	Districts of Aleppo Governorate	B	Muhammad Ismat Omar	
94	Districts of Aleppo Governorate	B	Abd al-Fattah Makhlouf	
95	Districts of Aleppo Governorate	B	Fadel Kanno	
96	Districts of Aleppo Governorate	B	Tariq Marai	
97	Districts of Aleppo Governorate	B	Aql al-Ibrahim	
98	Districts of Aleppo Governorate	B	Abd al-Hamid al-Ghabari	Independent
99	Districts of Aleppo Governorate	B	Muhammad Ibrahim	
100	Districts of Aleppo Governorate	B	Muhammad Mamoun Taloustan	
101	Homs	A	Taqi al-Younes	
102	Homs	A	Ali Buaiti	
103	Homs	A	Ibtisam Razzouq	
104	Homs	A	Abd al-Rahim Fadel	
105	Homs	A	Muhammad Ghassan al-Sibai	
106	Homs	A	Khadr al-Naim	
107	Homs	A	Mustafa al-Issa	
108	Homs	A	Abd al-Aziz al-Mulhim	Ba'ath Party
109	Homs	A	Mahmoud al-Fadous	Independent
110	Homs	A	Fuad Salama	
111	Homs	A	Taha al-Maghribi	
112	Homs	B	Muhammad Yasser al-Saqqa	
113	Homs	B	Shaban Shahin	
114	Homs	B	Adnan Khuzaam	
115	Homs	B	Ibrahim Haswa	
116	Homs	B	Salma Ayyash	
117	Homs	B	Mataniyus Asfoura	
118	Homs	B	Jumaa al-Hamoud	
119	Homs	B	Ahmad al-Sheikh	Independent
120	Homs	B	Tahir Ayyoub	
121	Homs	B	Ahmad Tarraf	
122	Homs	B	Shahadeh Mayhoub	Independent
123	Homs	B	Youssef al-Nasser	
124	Hama	A	Amin Asfar	
125	Hama	A	Jawid Salama	
126	Hama	A	Khalil Mahfoud	
127	Hama	A	Jamila Fallaheh	
128	Hama	A	Ahmad al-Ahmad	
129	Hama	A	Younes Salami	
130	Hama	A	Hussein Muhammad al-Hussein	
131	Hama	A	Hassan Hassan	
132	Hama	A	Mustafa Issa	
133	Hama	A	Abd al-Karim al-Ismail	Independent
134	Hama	A	Ibrahim Khalil	
135	Hama	A	Mustafa Abd al-Rahman	
136	Hama	A	Abd al-Wahhab Sultan	
137	Hama	B	Walid Hamdoun	
138	Hama	B	Hassan Sabbahi	
139	Hama	B	Mamoun al-Jarf	
140	Hama	B	Souad al-Sheikh Bakkour	Ba'ath Party
141	Hama	B	Adnan Kizawi	
142	Hama	B	Ghassan Othman	
143	Hama	B	Yassin Waqqaf	
144	Hama	B	Abd al-Qadir Mustafa	
145	Hama	B	Ahmad al-Amouri	
146	Latakia	A	Haifa Saqr	
147	Latakia	A	Jamila Shreiki	
148	Latakia	A	Rafiq Darwish	
149	Latakia	A	Tawfiq Darwish	
150	Latakia	A	Abd al-Karim Badawi	
151	Latakia	A	Fuad Mathbout	
152	Latakia	A	Anan Shabou	
153	Latakia	A	Ibrahim al-Lawza	
154	Latakia	A	Suhail Shahadeh	
155	Latakia	B	Jamil al-Assad	Ba'ath Party
156	Latakia	B	Ahmad Abu Musa	
157	Latakia	B	Muhammad Saad	
158	Latakia	B	Suhail Kanaan	
159	Latakia	B	Fuad Zoubari	
160	Latakia	B	Omar Hazim	
161	Latakia	B	Bahjat Saad	
162	Latakia	B	Fayez Othman	
163	Idlib	A	Jamil Latta	
164	Idlib	A	Abd al-Razzaq al-Hamou	
165	Idlib	A	Muhammad Majid al-Ramadan	
166	Idlib	A	Omar Hassani	
167	Idlib	A	Muhammad Nadhir Dweidri	
168	Idlib	A	Abd al-Latif Shakir	
169	Idlib	A	Muhammad Osama Halabi	
170	Idlib	A	Khalid al-Khader	
171	Idlib	A	Khalidiya Kabtawi	
172	Idlib	A	Mahmoud Haj Ahmad	
173	Idlib	A	Nasr al-Yousef	
174	Idlib	A	N/A	
175	Idlib	B	Muhammad Nihad Mishantat	
176	Idlib	B	Muhammad Latouf	
177	Idlib	B	Bashira Hamed	
178	Idlib	B	Muhammad Rahhal	
179	Idlib	B	Rifat Daqqa	
180	Idlib	B	N/A	
181	Tartus	A	Suleiman Muhammad	
182	Tartus	A	Amal Mardash	
183	Tartus	A	Abdallah Hussein	
184	Tartus	A	Muhammad Ghassan Tayyara	
185	Tartus	A	Yahya al-Khaddam	
186	Tartus	A	Kharfan al-Heifi	
187	Tartus	B	Nadim al-Kanj	
188	Tartus	B	Ramadan Atiya	
189	Tartus	B	Muhammad Saleh	
190	Tartus	B	Mahmoud Youssef	
191	Tartus	B	Najm al-Din al-Saleh	
192	Tartus	B	Nazih Bashour	
193	Tartus	B	N/A	
194	Raqqa	A	Ismail al-Ali	
195	Raqqa	A	Mustafa al-Ayed	
196	Raqqa	A	Najwa al-Ajeili	
197	Raqqa	A	Shaban al-Hamoud al-Khalaf	
198	Raqqa	B	Abd al-Razzaq al-Zaher	
199	Raqqa	B	Ibrahim al-Ajil	
200	Raqqa	B	Ismail Abd al-Ghani	
201	Raqqa	B	Muhammad al-Huwaidi	Independent
202	Deir ez-Zor	A	Abdallah Safif	
203	Deir ez-Zor	A	Zahra al-Jassem	
204	Deir ez-Zor	A	Ahmad al-Hammad	
205	Deir ez-Zor	A	Abd al-Jabbar al-Mardoud	
206	Deir ez-Zor	A	Abd al-Majid al-Marzouq	
207	Deir ez-Zor	A	Naji al-Sheikh Fares	
208	Deir ez-Zor	A	Faisal al-Sheikh Fayyad al-Nasser	
209	Deir ez-Zor	A	Fateh al-Zawi	
210	Deir ez-Zor	B	Ahmad al-Fayyad	
211	Deir ez-Zor	B	Ahmad al-Muhammad	
212	Deir ez-Zor	B	Ramzi Muhammad Ghazi	
213	Deir ez-Zor	B	Ammash Jdeia	Ba'ath Party
214	Deir ez-Zor	B	Khalil al-Hafl	Independent
215	Deir ez-Zor	B	Faisal al-Najras	Independent
216	Al-Hasakah	A	Youssef Ahmad	Ba'ath Party
217	Al-Hasakah	A	Munifa Darwish	
218	Al-Hasakah	A	Hamed al-Jassem	
219	Al-Hasakah	A	Muhammad al-Ali	
220	Al-Hasakah	A	Mahmoud al-Hassan	Ba'ath Party
221	Al-Hasakah	A	Muhammad Haitham Dweihi	
222	Al-Hasakah	A	Muhammad Abd al-Rahman	
223	Al-Hasakah	A	Mahmoud al-Boursan	
224	Al-Hasakah	B	Fawaz al-Daqouri	
225	Al-Hasakah	B	Ibrahim Abdallah	
226	Al-Hasakah	B	Abd al-Ahad Safar	
227	Al-Hasakah	B	Hamad al-Zaher	
228	Al-Hasakah	B	Muhammad al-Musallat al-Melhem	Independent
229	Al-Hasakah	B	Ziya Malak Ismail	Independent
230	Daraa	A	Ali Abd al-Karim	
231	Daraa	A	Awda al-Qassis	
232	Daraa	A	Ahmad Bahjat al-Hariri	
233	Daraa	A	Farouk al-Hamadi	
234	Daraa	A	Youssef Abu Roumiya al-Saadi	Independent
235	Daraa	B	Mahmoud al-Zoubi	Ba'ath Party
236	Daraa	B	Muhammad Jamil Muharib	
237	Daraa	B	Najah Mahamid	
238	Daraa	B	Nabil al-Miqdad	
239	Daraa	B	Farouq al-Dukhan	
240	Suwayda	A	Ghazi Nawfal	
241	Suwayda	A	Jamil al-Faqih	
242	Suwayda	A	Ahmad al-Zughair	
243	Suwayda	A	Abdallah al-Atrash	Independent
244	Suwayda	B	Rashrash Falahout	
245	Suwayda	B	Kamal Amer	Independent
246	Quneitra	A	Abd al-Majid al-Faouri	
247	Quneitra	A	Shakib Abu Jabal	
248	Quneitra	A	Muhyi al-Din al-Omar	
249	Quneitra	B	Sharaf al-Din Abaza	
250	Quneitra	B	Khalid Hassan al-Abboud	

== By-elections ==
Electoral district	Date	Previous incumbent	Party	Winner	Party	Cause
Tartus	19 May 1995	Yahya Khaddam		Mikhail Hajjar		Death.
Idlib	19 May 1995	Muhammad Majid al-Ramadan		Muhammad Adib Najm		Death.
Deir ez-Zor	14 July 1995	Abdallah Safif		Daoud al-Shaher		Death.
Suwayda	1 September 1995	Jamil al-Faqih		Kamal Ballan		Death.
Idlib	15 March 1996	Muhammad Adib Najm		Muhammad Fuad Najm		Death.
Tartus	21 June 1996	Muhammad Saleh		Wajih al-Sheikh		Death.
Damascus	20 December 1996	Elias Najmeh		Akram al-Khoury		Resigned after being appointed an ambassador.
