= List of members of the People's Assembly (Syria), 1981–1985 =

This is a list of members elected to the 3rd People's Assembly , following the 1981 parliamentary election.

== Members ==
No.	Electoral district	Sector	Name	Party
1	Damascus	A	Abd al-Razzaq Aqbiq	
2	Damascus	A	Yassin Atika	
3	Damascus	A	Yassin Otabashi	
4	Damascus	A	Ali al-Turkmeni	
5	Damascus	A	Mahmoud Salama	
6	Damascus	A	Muhammad al-Buzum	
7	Damascus	A	Rajab Izzo al-Baba	
8	Damascus	A	Abdo Tama	
9	Damascus	B	Ahmad Aladdin Abidin	
10	Damascus	B	Abd al-Qadir Qaddura	Ba'ath Party
11	Damascus	B	Nur al-Din Habbal	
12	Damascus	B	Hanan Najmeh	
13	Damascus	B	Hajar Sadiq	
14	Damascus	B	Ferial Muhayni	
15	Damascus	B	Muhammad Samih Skaff	
16	Damascus	B	Muhammad Shakir Asaid	
17	Damascus	B	Muhammad Hilal al-Saudi	
18	Damascus	B	Muhammad Marwan Sheikho	
19	Damascus	B	Ghassan Shalhoub	
20	Damascus	B	Tahsin al-Safadi	
21	Damascus	B	Hani al-Rumani	
22	Damascus	B	Zuhair Urabi	
23	Rif Dimashq	A	Hassan Beiraqdar	
24	Rif Dimashq	A	Ruiyat Ofouf al-Yassin	
25	Rif Dimashq	A	Okasha al-Qadri	
26	Rif Dimashq	A	Muhammad Shaddad	
27	Rif Dimashq	A	Hilal Rizq	
28	Rif Dimashq	A	Muwaffaq al-Azab	
29	Rif Dimashq	A	Widad Zarqa	
30	Rif Dimashq	A	Yassin al-Shalabi	
31	Rif Dimashq	B	Ahmad Diyab	Ba'ath Party
32	Rif Dimashq	B	Said Bakkar	
33	Rif Dimashq	B	Salah Darwish	
34	Rif Dimashq	B	Karam al-Khoury	
35	Rif Dimashq	B	Muhammad Nazim Qaddour	
36	Rif Dimashq	B	Mustafa Slakho	
37	Rif Dimashq	B	Youssef Jaidani	
38	Aleppo	A	Darwish Darwish	
39	Aleppo	A	Ahmad al-Labid	
40	Aleppo	A	Muhammad Fateh Hamwi	
41	Aleppo	A	Ali Kassado	
42	Aleppo	A	Mahmoud Shuwayhina	
43	Aleppo	A	Abboud Haddad	
44	Aleppo	B	Muhammad Zuhair Masharqa	
45	Aleppo	B	Malak Martini	
46	Aleppo	B	Adnan Eid	
47	Aleppo	B	Jurji Azar	
48	Aleppo	B	Muhammad Nuri Antabi	
49	Aleppo	B	Abdallah Mousalli	
50	Aleppo	B	Ali Rida	
51	Aleppo	B	Muhammad Adel Jamous	
52	Aleppo	B	Grigor Ablighatian	
53	Aleppo	B	Muhammad Dhafer Khairallah	
54	Districts of Aleppo Governorate	A	Mustafa Hamoush	
55	Districts of Aleppo Governorate	A	Wahid Abu Ras	
56	Districts of Aleppo Governorate	A	Muhammad Murad	
57	Districts of Aleppo Governorate	A	Abd al-Razzaq Abd al-Majid	
58	Districts of Aleppo Governorate	A	Ahmad al-Shihabi	
59	Districts of Aleppo Governorate	A	Taha Ghabash	
60	Districts of Aleppo Governorate	A	Muhammad Khair Khallu	
61	Districts of Aleppo Governorate	A	Mahmoud al-Jaffal	
62	Districts of Aleppo Governorate	A	Ali Attar	
63	Districts of Aleppo Governorate	A	Issa al-Zamel	
64	Districts of Aleppo Governorate	A	Diab al-Mashi	Independent
65	Districts of Aleppo Governorate	A	Sobhi Kanno	
66	Districts of Aleppo Governorate	A	Ibrahim al-Othman	
67	Districts of Aleppo Governorate	B	Ahmad Shawqi Kallou	
68	Districts of Aleppo Governorate	B	Ali al-Ibrahim	
69	Districts of Aleppo Governorate	B	Ismat Ghabari	
70	Districts of Aleppo Governorate	B	Hammad al-Qadi	
71	Districts of Aleppo Governorate	B	Battal Battal	
72	Districts of Aleppo Governorate	B	Abd al-Majid Loulak	
73	Districts of Aleppo Governorate	B	Ahmad Bakur	
74	Districts of Aleppo Governorate	B	Omar al-Ibrahim	
75	Districts of Aleppo Governorate	B	Farouq al-Jasim	
76	Districts of Aleppo Governorate	B	Mamoun Taloustan	
77	Districts of Aleppo Governorate	B	Ahmad Disho	
78	Districts of Aleppo Governorate	B	Abdallah Shukri	
79	Homs	A	Muhammad Ghazi Tayyara	
80	Homs	A	Ismail al-Qasim	
81	Homs	A	Mahmoud al-Diab	
82	Homs	A	Tamim Issa	
83	Homs	A	Abd al-Hadi al-Assad	
84	Homs	A	Nazih Said	
85	Homs	A	Abd al-Aziz al-Mulhim	Ba'ath Party
86	Homs	A	Ali Haydar	
87	Homs	A	Ahmad Talib	
88	Homs	B	Hiyam al-Soufi	
89	Homs	B	Shaban Shahin	
90	Homs	B	Ibrahim al-Jaour	
91	Homs	B	Ibrahim Ibrahim	
92	Homs	B	Sabaa al-Sabaa	
93	Homs	B	Munif Shukri	
94	Homs	B	Said Farzat	
95	Homs	B	Tawfiq al-Naqri	
96	Homs	B	Kamal al-Shaghouri	
97	Hama	A	Muhammad Eid Latmini	
98	Hama	A	Ahmad al-Ahmad	
99	Hama	A	Asaad al-Mustafa	
100	Hama	A	Hassan Ghali	
101	Hama	A	Mahmoud Khairbek	
102	Hama	A	Mustafa Shakoush	
103	Hama	A	Michel Richa	
104	Hama	A	Marwan al-Ibrahim	
105	Hama	A	Ghasoun Murad Agha	
106	Hama	A	Khalil Mahfoud	
107	Hama	B	Walid Hamdoun	
108	Hama	B	Adib Youssef	
109	Hama	B	Hikmat Fardawi	
110	Hama	B	Hamed Hassan	
111	Hama	B	Munawwer Makhlouta	
112	Hama	B	Mohsen Maalla	
113	Hama	B	Abd al-Wahhab Sattam Saffaf	
114	Latakia	A	Tawfiq Darwish	
115	Latakia	A	Rafiq Darwish	
116	Latakia	A	Farid Janauro	
117	Latakia	A	Ibrahim al-Lawza	
118	Latakia	A	Omar Ashour	
119	Latakia	A	Mahmoud Ajil	
120	Latakia	A	Ahmad Darji	
121	Latakia	B	Jamil al-Assad	Ba'ath Party
122	Latakia	B	Tawfiq Ibrahim	
123	Latakia	B	Adnan Khuzeim	
124	Latakia	B	Ghazi Khadra	
125	Latakia	B	Ahmad Abu Musa	
126	Latakia	B	Wafaa Snain	
127	Idlib	A	Mustafa al-Yousefi	
128	Idlib	A	Muhammad Saleh Hajo	
129	Idlib	A	Omar al-Rai	
130	Idlib	A	Mahmoud Haj Ahmad	
131	Idlib	A	Mustafa Latouf	
132	Idlib	A	Tawfiq al-Ibrahim	
133	Idlib	A	Khalid al-Khader	
134	Idlib	A	Mahdi Janem	
135	Idlib	A	Munir Qatini	
136	Idlib	B	Muhammad Shakib al-Taha	
137	Idlib	B	Muhammad Nadhir Dweidri	
138	Idlib	B	Karim Sheikh Karim	
139	Idlib	B	Muhammad Kamal Hammadi	
140	Idlib	B	Mustafa Sayyid Ahmad	
141	Tartus	A	Youssef Mardash	
142	Tartus	A	Muhammad Hashim Ali	
143	Tartus	A	Ali Salim Ibrahim	
144	Tartus	A	Muhammad Ghassan Tayyara	
145	Tartus	A	Muhammad Tawfiq Hassan	
146	Tartus	B	Mohsen Muhammad Bilal	
147	Tartus	B	Waheeb Salim Tannous	
148	Tartus	B	Nawal al-Muhammad	
149	Tartus	B	Najm al-Din al-Saleh	
150	Tartus	B	Muhammad Ghassan Othman	
151	Raqqa	A	Ismail Abd al-Ghani	
152	Raqqa	A	Jasim al-Mousa	
153	Raqqa	A	Mustafa al-Ayed	
154	Raqqa	B	Khalaf al-Darwish	
155	Raqqa	B	Abd al-Razzaq al-Huwaidi	
156	Raqqa	B	Ghazi al-Hussein	
157	Deir ez-Zor	A	Ghassan al-Abd al-Rajab	
158	Deir ez-Zor	A	Nuri al-Sayyah	
159	Deir ez-Zor	A	Abd al-Qahhar Ubaid	
160	Deir ez-Zor	A	Abd al-Karim Abboud	
161	Deir ez-Zor	A	Jarad al-Khalaf	
162	Deir ez-Zor	A	Abboud al-Hafl	
163	Deir ez-Zor	B	Ibtisam al-Taha al-Husseini	
164	Deir ez-Zor	B	Rayyis al-Fayyad	
165	Deir ez-Zor	B	Walid Shuaibi	
166	Deir ez-Zor	B	Jassem al-Bashir	
167	Deir ez-Zor	B	Fayyad Murair	
168	Al-Hasakah	A	Daoud Soumi	
169	Al-Hasakah	A	Nasser al-Amadi	
170	Al-Hasakah	A	Mahmoud al-Hassan	Ba'ath Party
171	Al-Hasakah	A	Mazen Sabbagh	
172	Al-Hasakah	A	Omar Daoud	
173	Al-Hasakah	A	Suleiman al-Jinaa	
174	Al-Hasakah	B	Sameera Jibrail	
175	Al-Hasakah	B	Ahmad al-Abdallah	
176	Al-Hasakah	B	Abd al-Karim Kadda	
177	Al-Hasakah	B	Khalaf al-Azzawi	
178	Al-Hasakah	B	Abd al-Wahhab al-Issa	
179	Daraa	A	Dheeb al-Hariri	
180	Daraa	A	Awda al-Qassis	
181	Daraa	A	Muhammad Oqab	
182	Daraa	A	Youssef al-Jabawi	
183	Daraa	B	Mahmoud al-Zoubi	Ba'ath Party
184	Daraa	B	Ahmad al-Masalmeh	
185	Daraa	B	Muhammad Zabout	
186	Daraa	B	Youssef Mahamid	
187	Suwayda	A	Assad Masoud	
188	Suwayda	A	Turki al-Qintar	
189	Suwayda	A	Fendi al-Atrash	
190	Suwayda	B	Adel Abu Asali	
191	Suwayda	B	Fadlallah Nasser al-Din	
192	Quneitra	A	Adel Haj Ahmad	
193	Quneitra	A	Muhammad Ghazi Jarida	
194	Quneitra	B	Nur al-Din Kanj	
195	Quneitra	B	Yassin Sweid	

== By-elections ==
Electoral district	Date	Previous incumbent	Party	Winner	Party	Cause
Quneitra	1984	Nur al-Din Kanj		Sami al-Saleh		Death.
Latakia	1984	Ahmad Darji		Mustafa Abd al-Halim		Death.
Homs	1984	Tawfiq al-Naqri		Khadr al-Youssef		Death.
Deir ez-Zor	1984	Rayyis al-Fayyad		Ahmad al-Fayyad		Death.
Homs	1985			Abd al-Khaliq Muhib al-Din		Death.
