= List of members of the People's Assembly (Syria), 2024 =

This is a list of members elected to the 4th People's Assembly, following the 2024 parliamentary election.

== Composition ==
Party		Members		
Party		Elected in 2024	At dissolution	Difference
NPF	Ba'ath Party	169 / 250 (68%)	166 / 250 (66%)	▼3
NPF	Arab Socialist Union Party	4 / 250 (2%)	4 / 250 (2%)	Steady
NPF	Syrian Social Nationalist Party	3 / 250 (1%)	3 / 250 (1%)	Steady
NPF	Communist (Unified)	3 / 250 (1%)	3 / 250 (1%)	Steady
NPF	National Covenant Party	2 / 250 (0.8%)	2 / 250 (0.8%)	Steady
NPF	Communist (Bakdash)	1 / 250 (0.4%)	1 / 250 (0.4%)	Steady
NPF	Democratic Socialist Unionist Party	1 / 250 (0.4%)	1 / 250 (0.4%)	Steady
NPF	Arab Democratic Union Party	1 / 250 (0.4%)	1 / 250 (0.4%)	Steady
NPF	Socialist Unionist Party	1 / 250 (0.4%)	1 / 250 (0.4%)	Steady
Independent		65 / 250 (26%)	62 / 250 (25%)	▼3
Vacant		0	6 / 250 (2%)	▲6

== Members ==
No.	Electoral district	Sector	Name	Party
1	Damascus	A	Raedah Waqaf	Ba'ath Party
2	Damascus	A	Ahd al-Kanj	Ba'ath Party
3	Damascus	A	Firas al-Azab	Ba'ath Party
4	Damascus	A	Muhammad Hadi Mashhadiyah	Ba'ath Party
5	Damascus	A	Ahmad al-Issa	Ba'ath Party
6	Damascus	A	Muhammad Thaer al-Johari	Ba'ath Party
7	Damascus	A	Nabil Dawoud	Independent
8	Damascus	A	Ghaleb Aniz	Independent
9	Damascus	A	Muhammad Akram al-Ajlani	Independent
10	Damascus	A	Nuha Mahayri	Independent
11	Damascus	B	Sameer al-Jazaerli	Ba'ath Party
12	Damascus	B	Alaa Zaza	Ba'ath Party
13	Damascus	B	Elias Shahhoud	Ba'ath Party
14	Damascus	B	Anwar al-Zeer	Ba'ath Party
15	Damascus	B	Inas Zarzoor	Ba'ath Party
16	Damascus	B	Khalil Wannous	Ba'ath Party
17	Damascus	B	Muhammad Khaled Zbeidi	Ba'ath Party
18	Damascus	B	Raed al-Aqqad	DSUP
19	Damascus	B	Elias al-Munayyir	Communist (Unified)
20	Damascus	B	Anas al-Khatib	Ba'ath Party
21	Damascus	B	Muhammad Hamsho	Independent
22	Damascus	B	Fahd Mahmoud	Independent
23	Damascus	B	Muhammad Nadhir al-Haffar	Independent
24	Damascus	B	Muhammad Omar al-Kheimi	Independent
25	Damascus	B	Muhammad Mazen Hassan	Independent
26	Damascus	B	Bashar al-Khani	Independent
27	Damascus	B	Heba Khodra	Independent
28	Damascus	B	Jamil Murad	Independent
29	Damascus	B	Bilal al-Naal	Independent
30	Rif Dimashq	A	Hikmat al-Azab	Ba'ath Party
31	Rif Dimashq	A	Abd al-Rahman al-Khatib	Ba'ath Party
32	Rif Dimashq	A	Nabil Darwish	Ba'ath Party
33	Rif Dimashq	A	Reema al-Rifai	Ba'ath Party
34	Rif Dimashq	A	Haifaa Jumaa	Ba'ath Party
35	Rif Dimashq	A	Yousef al-Hassan	Ba'ath Party
36	Rif Dimashq	A	Fadi Abu Qash	Ba'ath Party
37	Rif Dimashq	A	Shehadeh Abu Hamed	Ba'ath Party
38	Rif Dimashq	A	Faisal al-Raqqad	Ba'ath Party
39	Rif Dimashq	A	Muhammad Khair al-Nader	Independent
40	Rif Dimashq	B	Ali Saadat	Ba'ath Party
41	Rif Dimashq	B	Hassan al-Jabhaji	Ba'ath Party
42	Rif Dimashq	B	Mujahid Ismail	Ba'ath Party
43	Rif Dimashq	B	Osama Mustafa	Ba'ath Party
44	Rif Dimashq	B	Rimon Hilal	Ba'ath Party
45	Rif Dimashq	B	Ahmad Hijazi	Ba'ath Party
46	Rif Dimashq	B	Fahd Is'haq	ASU
47	Rif Dimashq	B	Ziad Khallouf	Independent
48	Rif Dimashq	B	Abdul-Latif Daboura	Independent
49	Aleppo	A	Samer Hallaq	Ba'ath Party
50	Aleppo	A	Abd al-Hamid Seirafi	Ba'ath Party
51	Aleppo	A	Jamal Nasleh	Ba'ath Party
52	Aleppo	A	Ghassan Sakit	Ba'ath Party
53	Aleppo	A	Mariette Khoury	Ba'ath Party
54	Aleppo	A	Hassan Kaakeh	Independent
55	Aleppo	A	Shadi Dibsi	Independent
56	Aleppo	B	Abd al-Munim al-Sawa	Ba'ath Party
57	Aleppo	B	Salloum al-Salloum	Ba'ath Party
58	Aleppo	B	Abdo Mousalli	Ba'ath Party
59	Aleppo	B	Ziad Tabbakh	Ba'ath Party
60	Aleppo	B	Faisal Azzouz	Ba'ath Party
61	Aleppo	B	Fatima Khalak	Ba'ath Party
62	Aleppo	B	Ahmad Hadleh	ASU
63	Aleppo	B	Al Hassan Berri	Independent
64	Aleppo	B	Hussein Kharboutli	Independent
65	Aleppo	B	Ziad Muhammad al-Hariri	Independent
66	Aleppo	B	Muhammad Amer Hamwi	Independent
67	Aleppo	B	Maria Manouk	Independent
68	Aleppo	B	Maher Hajjar	Independent
69	Districts of Aleppo Governorate	A	Muhammad al-Asaad	Ba'ath Party
70	Districts of Aleppo Governorate	A	Qussay al-Thaljah	Ba'ath Party
71	Districts of Aleppo Governorate	A	Qais al-Muhammad	Ba'ath Party
72	Districts of Aleppo Governorate	A	Saba Shalo	Ba'ath Party
73	Districts of Aleppo Governorate	A	Sheikh Ibrahim al-Bakkouri	Ba'ath Party
74	Districts of Aleppo Governorate	A	Nawal al-Areef	Ba'ath Party
75	Districts of Aleppo Governorate	A	Ahmad al-Zaidan	Ba'ath Party
76	Districts of Aleppo Governorate	A	Mustafa al-Marii	Ba'ath Party
77	Districts of Aleppo Governorate	A	Hussein al-Hammadin	Ba'ath Party
78	Districts of Aleppo Governorate	A	Salah al-Ali	Ba'ath Party
79	Districts of Aleppo Governorate	A	Hussein Hassoun	Ba'ath Party
80	Districts of Aleppo Governorate	A	Qassem Hassan	Ba'ath Party
81	Districts of Aleppo Governorate	A	Obeid al-Obeid al-Issa	Independent
82	Districts of Aleppo Governorate	A	Fares Jneidan	Independent
83	Districts of Aleppo Governorate	A	Muhammad Subhi Sheikh al-Daia	Independent
84	Districts of Aleppo Governorate	A	Omar al-Hassan	Independent
85	Districts of Aleppo Governorate	A	Muhammad Khair al-Mashi	Independent
86	Districts of Aleppo Governorate	B	Alan Bakr	Ba'ath Party
87	Districts of Aleppo Governorate	B	Abdul-Aziz al-Assaf	Ba'ath Party
88	Districts of Aleppo Governorate	B	Abdul-Razzaq Barakat	Ba'ath Party
89	Districts of Aleppo Governorate	B	Eid al-Suweis	Ba'ath Party
90	Districts of Aleppo Governorate	B	Taha al-Hajj Ali	Ba'ath Party
91	Districts of Aleppo Governorate	B	Yasser Kaadeh	Ba'ath Party
92	Districts of Aleppo Governorate	B	Muhammad al-Hassan al-Rabee	Ba'ath Party
93	Districts of Aleppo Governorate	B	Jibran al-Jomaa	Ba'ath Party
94	Districts of Aleppo Governorate	B	Abdul-Hakim al-Wardah	Ba'ath Party
95	Districts of Aleppo Governorate	B	Muhammad Abdullah	Communist (Bakdash)
96	Districts of Aleppo Governorate	B	Mujib al-Rahman al-Dandan	Independent
97	Districts of Aleppo Governorate	B	Raslan al-Ali al-Raslan	Independent
98	Districts of Aleppo Governorate	B	Adnan al-Hamad	Independent
99	Districts of Aleppo Governorate	B	Abd al-Ilah al-Abdou	Independent
100	Districts of Aleppo Governorate	B	Muhammad Nizar Darwish Meido	Independent
101	Homs	A	Maalla al-Khader	Ba'ath Party
102	Homs	A	Shehadeh Matar	Ba'ath Party
103	Homs	A	Abd al-Hamid al-Naqri	Ba'ath Party
104	Homs	A	Hazem al-Nasser	Ba'ath Party
105	Homs	A	Mayouf al-Dhiab	Ba'ath Party
106	Homs	A	Ali al-Assaf	Ba'ath Party
107	Homs	A	Nizar al-Farra	Ba'ath Party
108	Homs	A	Ahmad al-Ali	Ba'ath Party
109	Homs	A	Raef Ali	Ba'ath Party
110	Homs	A	Nasser al-Nasser	Independent
111	Homs	A	Afeef Dallo	Independent
112	Homs	B	Muhammad Khaled Maani	Ba'ath Party
113	Homs	B	Youssef al-Salamah	Ba'ath Party
114	Homs	B	Sayil Dawoud	Ba'ath Party
115	Homs	B	Aref al-Sheikh	Ba'ath Party
116	Homs	B	Mundhir Ibrahim	Ba'ath Party
117	Homs	B	Ahed al-Sukkari	Ba'ath Party
118	Homs	B	Asia Ayoub	Ba'ath Party
119	Homs	B	Jamal Ali Suleiman	ASU
120	Homs	B	Jack al-Shami	SSNP
121	Homs	B	Firas al-Salloum	Independent
122	Homs	B	Wael Mulhem	Independent
123	Homs	B	Hani Oudeh	Independent
124	Hama	A	Ikhlas Farran	Ba'ath Party
125	Hama	A	Maher Qawarma	Ba'ath Party
126	Hama	A	Hammam Dibyat	Ba'ath Party
127	Hama	A	Mustafa Khalil	Ba'ath Party
128	Hama	A	Yahya al-Asfar	ADUP
129	Hama	A	Ali Abboud	Ba'ath Party
130	Hama	A	Fadi al-Abbas	Ba'ath Party
131	Hama	A	Muhammad Sharabi	Ba'ath Party
132	Hama	A	Mustafa al-Mustafa	Ba'ath Party
133	Hama	A	Saeed al-Awadh	Ba'ath Party
134	Hama	A	Ali al-Amouri	Independent
135	Hama	A	Abd al-Karim al-Ismail	Independent
136	Hama	A	Orouba Mahfoud	Independent
137	Hama	B	Ayman Malandi	Ba'ath Party
138	Hama	B	Ghazwan al-Salmoni	Ba'ath Party
139	Hama	B	Issa Wassouf	Ba'ath Party
140	Hama	B	Issam Sabbahi	Ba'ath Party
141	Hama	B	Ali Barakat	Ba'ath Party
142	Hama	B	Hassan al-Qassem	Ba'ath Party
143	Hama	B	Abdul-Aziz Othman	National Covenant
144	Hama	B	Yousef al-Asfar	Independent
145	Hama	B	Mahdi al-Ali	Independent
146	Latakia	A	Ammar al-Assad	Ba'ath Party
147	Latakia	A	Iskandar Haddad	Ba'ath Party
148	Latakia	A	Rafiq al-Alouni	Ba'ath Party
149	Latakia	A	Ayman Ahmad	Ba'ath Party
150	Latakia	A	Eva Hor	Ba'ath Party
151	Latakia	A	Yousef Shahin	Ba'ath Party
152	Latakia	A	Haitham Omran	Ba'ath Party
153	Latakia	A	Sobhi Abbas	Independent
154	Latakia	A	Rassem Masri	Independent
155	Latakia	B	Jihad Barakat	Ba'ath Party
156	Latakia	B	Razaan Murtada	Ba'ath Party
157	Latakia	B	Ayham Jreikos	Ba'ath Party
158	Latakia	B	Ahmad Hamidoush	Ba'ath Party
159	Latakia	B	Amer Ghareeb	Ba'ath Party
160	Latakia	B	Bashir Ghalawunji	ASU
161	Latakia	B	Zein al-Abidin Abbas	Independent
162	Latakia	B	Nabil Elias	Independent
163	Idlib	A	Ahmad al-Mubarak	Ba'ath Party
164	Idlib	A	Ahmad al-Faraj	Ba'ath Party
165	Idlib	A	Asaad Jawhar	Ba'ath Party
166	Idlib	A	Mayada Jabbour	Ba'ath Party
167	Idlib	A	Abdul-Fattah al-Najjar	Ba'ath Party
168	Idlib	A	Fadel Zankalou	Ba'ath Party
169	Idlib	A	Fawzia Manna	Ba'ath Party
170	Idlib	A	Khaled al-Daher	Ba'ath Party
171	Idlib	A	Bayan Sheikh	Ba'ath Party
172	Idlib	A	Iyad Yousef	Ba'ath Party
173	Idlib	A	Hassan al-Hassani	Ba'ath Party
174	Idlib	A	Ahmad Aqrin	Independent
175	Idlib	B	Ahmad Naffakh	Ba'ath Party
176	Idlib	B	Muhammad al-Keshto	Ba'ath Party
177	Idlib	B	Abdul-Salam al-Ahmad	Ba'ath Party
178	Idlib	B	Jamal Masto	Ba'ath Party
179	Idlib	B	Ibrahim Atef Houri	SSNP
180	Idlib	B	Muhammad Hussein al-Hussein	Independent
181	Tartus	A	Siham al-Othman	Ba'ath Party
182	Tartus	A	Bassel Issa	Ba'ath Party
183	Tartus	A	Modar al-Aji	Ba'ath Party
184	Tartus	A	Younes Hamdoush	Ba'ath Party
185	Tartus	A	Ahmad Ali	Ba'ath Party
186	Tartus	A	Alaa Muhammad	Independent
187	Tartus	B	Qutaiba Badr	Ba'ath Party
188	Tartus	B	Fadi Abbas	Ba'ath Party
189	Tartus	B	Ahmad Fahl	Ba'ath Party
190	Tartus	B	Tony Hanna	Ba'ath Party
191	Tartus	B	Bayan Othman	Ba'ath Party
192	Tartus	B	Mahmoud Afif	Communist (Unified)
193	Tartus	B	Sanan Dargam	Independent
194	Raqqa	A	Ahmad Anayzan Ahmad	Ba'ath Party
195	Raqqa	A	Rasha al-Jureijib	Ba'ath Party
196	Raqqa	A	Ghazwan al-Ali	Ba'ath Party
197	Raqqa	A	Jamal al-Hussein	Independent
198	Raqqa	B	Nidal al-Alou	Ba'ath Party
199	Raqqa	B	Muhammad al-Fadous	Communist (Unified)
200	Raqqa	B	Raed al-Hanidi	Ba'ath Party
201	Raqqa	B	Ahmad al-Khalaf	Independent
202	Deir ez-Zor	A	Ahmad al-Shattat	Ba'ath Party
203	Deir ez-Zor	A	Sumer Zahir	Ba'ath Party
204	Deir ez-Zor	A	Feras al-Jaham	Ba'ath Party
205	Deir ez-Zor	A	Maisara al-Ahmad	Ba'ath Party
206	Deir ez-Zor	A	Ahmad al-Naser	Ba'ath Party
207	Deir ez-Zor	A	Ali Haj Khalifeh	Ba'ath Party
208	Deir ez-Zor	A	Yasser al-Salama	Ba'ath Party
209	Deir ez-Zor	A	Khalifa Hamd	Independent
210	Deir ez-Zor	B	Maram al-Askar	Ba'ath Party
211	Deir ez-Zor	B	Bashar al-Mutlaq	Ba'ath Party
212	Deir ez-Zor	B	Khaled al-Kamsh	National Covenant
213	Deir ez-Zor	B	Bashir al-Jarrad	Ba'ath Party
214	Deir ez-Zor	B	Ibrahim al-Shaher	Ba'ath Party
215	Deir ez-Zor	B	Madloul al-Aziz	Independent
216	Al-Hasakah	A	Abdullah al-Salmo	Ba'ath Party
217	Al-Hasakah	A	Khaled al-Hussein al-Hammadeh	Ba'ath Party
218	Al-Hasakah	A	Ali al-Jadha'an	Ba'ath Party
219	Al-Hasakah	A	Abboud al-Shawakh	Ba'ath Party
220	Al-Hasakah	A	Hassan Salloumi	Ba'ath Party
221	Al-Hasakah	A	Bashar Suleiman	Ba'ath Party
222	Al-Hasakah	A	Alaa al-Din al-Hamad	Independent
223	Al-Hasakah	A	Sattam al-Jarbou	Independent
224	Al-Hasakah	B	Hammouda Sabbagh	Ba'ath Party
225	Al-Hasakah	B	Muhammad Amin Musallat	Ba'ath Party
226	Al-Hasakah	B	Rihab al-Mustafa	Socialist Unionist
227	Al-Hasakah	B	Khaled al-Atiyah	Ba'ath Party
228	Al-Hasakah	B	Nour Durrah	Ba'ath Party
229	Al-Hasakah	B	Hassan al-Musallat	Independent
230	Daraa	A	Shukri al-Jundi	Ba'ath Party
231	Daraa	A	Manaf al-Fallah	Ba'ath Party
232	Daraa	A	Ahmad al-Jamous	Ba'ath Party
233	Daraa	A	Ahmad al-Suwaidan	Ba'ath Party
234	Daraa	A	Farouq al-Hamadi	Independent
235	Daraa	B	Mahrez al-Nasrallah	SSNP
236	Daraa	B	Yaseen al-Zamel	Ba'ath Party
237	Daraa	B	Faiza al-Adhbah	Ba'ath Party
238	Daraa	B	Abdul-Nasser al-Hariri	Ba'ath Party
239	Daraa	B	Yahya al-Mafaalani	Independent
240	Suwayda	A	Khaled Karbaj	Ba'ath Party
241	Suwayda	A	Nidal al-Ali	Ba'ath Party
242	Suwayda	A	Waseem Ezz al-Din	Ba'ath Party
243	Suwayda	A	Nashaat al-Atrash	Independent
244	Suwayda	B	Hekmat Abu Ghazi	Ba'ath Party
245	Suwayda	B	Mueen Nasr	Independent
246	Quneitra	A	Jamil al-Ghoutani	Ba'ath Party
247	Quneitra	A	Awad al-Ali	Ba'ath Party
248	Quneitra	A	Raafat Bakkar	Independent
249	Quneitra	B	Shadi Saleh	Ba'ath Party
250	Quneitra	B	Walid al-Darwish	Independent

== By-elections ==
Electoral district	Date	Previous incumbent	Party	Winner	Party	Cause
Aleppo	25 January 2025 (Note: Originally scheduled for 7 December 2024, the elections were postponed and effectively cancelled following the suspension and subsequent dissolution of the People's Assembly by the Syrian caretaker government.)	Shadi Dibsi	Independent	Election not held		Removed by the People's Assembly due to acquiring a foreign citizenship.
Tartus	7 December 2024	Tony Hanna	Ba'ath Party	Election not held (Note: The elections were effectively cancelled following the suspension and subsequent dissolution of the People's Assembly by the Syrian caretaker government.)		Resigned after being appointed governor of Quneitra.
Damascus	21 December 2024	Muhammad Hamsho	Independent	Election not held		Removed by the People's Assembly due to acquiring a foreign citizenship.
Districts of Aleppo Governorate	25 January 2025 (Note: Originally scheduled for 21 December 2024, the elections were postponed and effectively cancelled following the suspension and subsequent dissolution of the People's Assembly by the Syrian caretaker government.)	Mohammed Khair al-Mashi	Independent	Election not held		Death.
Damascus	21 December 2024	Anas al-Khatib	Ba'ath Party	Election not held		Removed by the People's Assembly due to acquiring a foreign citizenship.
Damascus	21 December 2024	Mohammad Khaled Zbeidi	Ba'ath Party	Election not held		Removed by the People's Assembly due to acquiring a foreign citizenship.
