= Maurice Salibi =

Syrian communist politician

Maurice Salibi (Arabic: موريس صليبي), a Syrian communist politician, who served as general secretary of the Syrian Communist Party for a brief period in 1968.

A lawyer by profession, Salibi hailed from the Christian minority. Salibi represented the second generation of leaders of the Syrian Communist Party. He was a prominent figure of the party in Homs in the 1940s. During three years he served as an envoy of the party to Europe, working at the World Peace Council in Prague and Vienna.

In 1968, the party leader Khalid Bakdash suffered a heart attack and was flown to Moscow for medical treatment. In Bakdash's absence Salibi was elected new party general secretary in September 1968. However, after the election a series of meetings of party leaders were held (in which the Soviet embassy in Damascus participated), and the election of Salibi was annulled. Salibi resigned from the post, and Yusuf Faisal was elected new provisional general secretary. A few months later Bakdash returned and reassumed his role as general secretary of the party. Salibi retained his seat in the party Central Committee, though.

When the Syrian Communist Party was divided in two in 1986, Salibi sided with Yusuf Faisal's faction. He remained a Politburo member of the Faisal-led Communist Party.
