= Jamil al-Assad =

Syrian politician (1932–2004)

- جميل الأسد

Personal details
- Born: 1932
- Died: 15 December 2004 (aged 71–72)
- Party: Ba'ath Party
- Children: 3
- Parent: Ali al-Assad (father)
- Relatives: Hafez al-Assad (brother); Rifaat al-Assad (brother); Yarub Ghazi (son-in-law)
- Occupation: Politician

Jamil al-Assad (Arabic: جميل الأسد; 1932 – 15 December 2004) was a younger brother of the late Syrian president Hafez al-Assad, and the uncle of former Syrian President Bashar al-Assad. He served in the People's Assembly of Syria from 1971 until his death in 2004. He was also commander of a minor militia.

== Activities ==
While both his brothers, Hafez and Rifaat al-Assad, enforced secularism, Jamil was said to be deeply religious. During the 1980s, Jamil actively supported conversion to Shiism in the Latakia Mountains, especially among members of the Alawite community. He sent groups of Alawites to study Twelver Shiism in Iran. They made the Shiite creed common among their fellow Alawites upon their return to Syria. Jamil also built husayniyyas in the mountains, where before there had been only Alawite shrines. In order to make Shiism more acceptable there he appointed a Shiite sheikh to head the Alawite al-Zahra Mosque in the city of Baniyas. He also allowed Iranian officials to enter Syria to realize conversions to Shiism.

In the 1980s, he set up a Latakia-based foundation (al-Murtada), which helped fellow Alawite Muslims to go on the Hajj pilgrimage to Mecca. The foundation is also said to have tried to convert Sunni Muslim bedouins to the Alawi faith, angering the secular ruling Baath Party in Syria. Whether true or not, the rumours caused friction with the majority Sunni population. Al-Murtada is also said to have had a militia wing, made up of Alawi Muslims, which was armed and equipped by Rifaat al-Assad's powerful internal security division, the Defense Companies. These gangs, called shabiha, involved in all kinds of mafia-style violence and corruption. Al-Murtada was banned by Hafez al-Assad in 1983. On the other hand, shabiha still exists.

Jamil's son Fawaz headed commando forces stationed in Latakia that were not under the command of the regular armed forces, but they were constructed as counterweights to the power of the regular military. Jamil al-Assad was put under house arrest in 1981 after an unsuccessful challenge to his brother, Hafez al-Assad.

When Rifaat Assad attempted in 1984 to exploit the failing health of Hafez, using the Defense Companies to stage a failed coup d'état, this cast doubt on Jamil in the eyes of Hafez. Some of his assets are reported to have been confiscated in retaliation, but there is little doubt he remained a very wealthy man.

Jamil was reported to have been sent into exile due to accusations of corruption to France at the end of 1996 or at the beginning of 1997.

Jamil headed the national security committee in Parliament later in his life. Unlike Rifaat, Jamil openly supported the succession to the presidency of Hafez al-Assad's son, Bashar. Jamil and his son, Fawaz, had quite a bit of real estate and commercial enterprises. Jamil reportedly spent most of later years in Europe. However, unlike Rifaat al-Assad, he was permitted to return periodically to Syria at his leisure. He was present at Hafez's funeral.

== Personal life ==
His sons are Mundhir (born 1961) and Fawaz (born 1962). One of his daughters married to Yarob Kanaan, a son of Ghazi Kanaan.

His eldest son, Mundhir, was arrested in 2005 at the Beirut Airport while entering Lebanon. He was reported to have been involved in arms smuggling to the Iraqi insurgents. In 2011, the EU placed sanctions on him for "being involved with the Shabbiha militia in the repression of protestors during the Syrian Civil War". The same sanctions were also placed on Fawaz Assad in 2011 by the European Union for "his involvement with the Shabbiha militia in the repression of protesters during the Syrian Civil War".

== Death ==
Jamil al-Assad died on 15 December 2004 at age 72 at a French hospital where he had been treated for about a month.

== See also ==
- al-Assad family
