= Quneitra (former People's Assembly electoral district) =

Former electoral district of Syria's national legislature

- Former electoral district for the People's Assembly
- Location of Quneitra within Syria
- Governorate: Quneitra
- Population: 105,124 (2021)

Former electoral district
- Created: 1973
- Abolished: 2025
- Seats: List: 5 (1990–2025); 4 (1973–1990)
- Created from: List: Al-Zawiya; Quneitra
- Replaced by: List: Fiq; Quneitra

Quneitra (Arabic: القنيطرة) was an electoral district used to elect members of the Syrian People's Assembly between 1973 and 2025.

== Electoral system ==
The electoral system used to elect the People's Assembly was introduced in 1973 and remained in use until the assembly's dissolution in 2025. Each governorate formed a single, large electoral district, except for Aleppo Governorate, which was divided into two districts: the city of Aleppo and the rural districts of Aleppo Governorate. Within each district, seats were awarded on a block-vote basis, with the candidates receiving the largest number of votes taking all of the seats allocated to it, and the assembly was composed of representatives of two sectors, "workers and peasants" and "other sectors of the people", with the former guaranteed at least half of its seats nationally. The number of seats, and their distribution among districts, was left to the president of the republic to set by decree rather than being fixed in law; the total was raised from 186 to 195 in 1981 and from 195 to 250 in 1990, after which the distribution among the fifteen electoral districts was not changed.

All Syrian citizens aged 18 and over were entitled to vote, other than those under legal guardianship, those with a mental illness affecting their legal capacity, and those convicted of a felony or a "dishonourable" misdemeanour, while serving members of the armed forces and police were barred from voting and from standing as candidates; candidates were further required to be at least 25 years old and to have held Syrian nationality for at least five years, a period raised to ten under the 2011 and 2014 electoral laws. During the 2011 reform of the electoral law, the replacement of this system was discussed because of its weak representativeness, but the large-district, block-vote system was retained; the reform instead moved the administration of elections from the Ministry of Interior and provincial governors to an independent Supreme Judicial Committee for Elections, a structure carried over into a further law passed in 2014 that consolidated the rules for presidential, parliamentary and local-council elections into a single statute.

Beyond being considered unrepresentative — a majoritarian, large-district system of a kind rejected by most electoral systems worldwide — the system has also been criticised for the unevenness of its distribution of seats between governorates. Based on the number of registered voters at the 2012 election, the average was around 59,000 voters per seat nationally, but the ratio varied considerably: about 37,800 voters per seat in Damascus and 51,500 in Tartus, compared with 71,700 in Al-Hasakah and 69,500 in the rural districts of Aleppo Governorate, with no mechanism beyond a presidential decree governing the size of constituencies or the allocation of seats between them.

== Members ==
Elections	MPA (Party)	MPA (Party)	MPA (Party)	MPA (Party)	MPA (Party)
1973	Khalid al-Khalid (N/A)	Saleh al-Tahhan (N/A)	Ali Anhar Ahmad (N/A)	Sami al-Saleh (N/A)	4 seats
1977	Aref Hamdan (N/A)	Mahmoud Maryoud (N/A)	Fuad Deeb (N/A)	Ismail al-Said (N/A)	4 seats
1981	Adel Haj Ahmad (N/A)	Muhammad Ghazi Jarida (N/A)	Nur al-Din Kanj (N/A)	Yassin Sweid (N/A)	4 seats
1984 by-election	Adel Haj Ahmad (N/A)	Muhammad Ghazi Jarida (N/A)	Sami al-Saleh (N/A)	Yassin Sweid (N/A)	4 seats
1986	Aref Haj Youssef (N/A)	Shakib Abu Jabal (N/A)	Marai Asaad al-Abboud (N/A)	Yassin Sweid (N/A)	4 seats
1990	Aref Haj Youssef (N/A)	Shakib Abu Jabal (N/A)	Abd al-Majid al-Faouri (N/A)	Radwan al-Tahhan (N/A)	Mohsen Ali (N/A)
1994	Muhyi al-Din al-Omar (N/A)	Shakib Abu Jabal (N/A)	Abd al-Majid al-Faouri (N/A)	Sharaf al-Din Abaza (N/A)	Khalid al-Abboud (N/A)
1998	Ali al-Mazal (N/A)	Midhat al-Saleh (N/A)	Abd al-Hadi al-Diyab (N/A)	Sharaf al-Din Abaza (N/A)	Khalid al-Abboud (N/A)
2003	Muhammad al-Fashtaki (N/A)	Muhammad al-Issa (N/A)	Nasr al-Din Khairallah (Ba'ath)	Sharaf al-Din Abaza (N/A)	Ismail Marai (Ba'ath)
2007	Moussa Ahmad (Ba'ath)	Leifen Shourah (Ba'ath)	Nasr al-Din Khairallah (Ba'ath)	Jihad Ismail (Ind.)	Ismail Marai (Ba'ath)
2012	Rifaat Hussein (Ba'ath)	Mohieddine Ibrahim (Ba'ath)	Hanaa al-Sayed (Ba'ath)	Saleh al-Tahan al-Naimi (Ba'ath)	Tariq al-Afash (Ind.)
2015 by-election	Rifaat Hussein (Ba'ath)	Mohieddine Ibrahim (Ba'ath)	Hanaa al-Sayed (Ba'ath)	Muhammad al-Afish (Ba'ath)	Tariq al-Afash (Ind.)
2016	Rifaat Hussein (Ba'ath)	Ayman Harrouq (Ba'ath)	Walid al-Darwish (Ind.)	Khaled Khazal (Ba'ath)	Jansit Ghazan (Ind.)
2020	Wahid al-Zaal (Ba'ath)	Rida al-Damqasi (Ba'ath)	Raafat Bakkar (Ind.)	Shadi Saleh (Ba'ath)	Khaled al-Sharaabi (Ind.)
2024	Jamil al-Ghoutani (Ba'ath)	Awad al-Ali (Ba'ath)	Raafat Bakkar (Ind.)	Shadi Saleh (Ba'ath)	Walid al-Darwish (Ind.)
