= Diab al-Mashi =

Syrian politician (1915–2009)

Member of the Syrian Parliament for Manbij
- In office November 1954 – 11 August 2009

Personal details
- Born: 1915 Jaifiniate al-Mashi, Aleppo Governorate, Syria
- Died: 11 August 2009 (Aged 94) Aleppo, Syria
- Party: People's Party, Ba'ath Party

Diab al-Mashi (1915 – 11 August 2009) (Arabic: دياب الماشي) was a member of the parliament of Syria, for the district of Manbij, Aleppo. He won his first term in the 1954 parliamentary elections, and has served continuously until his death. With 55 years of service, he is considered one of the longest-serving members of parliament ever.
