= List of members of the Chamber of Deputies (Syria), 1932–1933 =

This is a list of deputies elected to the 1st Chamber of Deputies, following the 1931–1932 parliamentary election.

== Deputies ==
No.	Electoral district	Name	Religious affiliation	Party
1	Damascus and suburbs	Jamil Mardam Bey		National Bloc
2	Damascus and suburbs	Fayez al-Khoury		National Bloc
3	Damascus and suburbs	Zaki al-Khatib		National Bloc
4	Damascus and suburbs	Lutfi al-Haffar		National Bloc
5	Damascus and suburbs	Fakhri al-Baroudi		National Bloc
6	Damascus and suburbs	Ihsan al-Sharif		National Bloc
7	Damascus and suburbs	Muhammad Ali al-Abid		Independent
8	Damascus and suburbs	Haqqi al-Azm		Independent
9	Damascus and suburbs	Nasib al-Bakri		National Bloc
10	Damascus and suburbs	Youssef Leniado	Jewish	Independent
11	Al-Nabek	Youssef Tayfur	Sunni	
12	Douma	Wadi al-Shishakli		
13	Douma	Nasib al-Kaylani		
14	Al-Qutayfah	Salim Daas	Sunni	
15	Wadi al-Ajam	Abu al-Huda al-Husaybi	Sunni	
16	Al-Zabadani	Jamil al-Shammat	Sunni	
17	Golan	Amin Samkoukh	Sunni	
18	Homs and suburbs	Hashim al-Atassi	Sunni	National Bloc
19	Homs and suburbs	Mazhar Raslan	Sunni	National Bloc
20	Homs and suburbs	Rafiq al-Husseini	Sunni	
21	Homs and suburbs	Ibrahim al-Dahiya	Alawite	
22	Hama	Najib al-Barazi		National Bloc
23	Hama	Tawfiq al-Shishakli		
24	Hama	Shamsi Nasrallah		
25	Salamiyah and al-Qaryatayn	Emir Suleiman Mirza	Ismaili	
26	Salamiyah and al-Qaryatayn	Ahmad Abd al-Rahman	Sunni	
27	Daraa	Muhammad al-Muflih al-Zoubi	Sunni	Independent
28	Izraa-Zawiya	Ismail al-Hariri	Sunni	
29	Izraa-Zawiya	Faris al-Zoubi	Sunni	
30	Tribes of Damascus	Nuri al-Shaalan	Sunni	
31	Aleppo City	Subhi Barakat	Sunni	Independent
32	Aleppo City	Ghalib Ibrahim Pasha	Sunni	
33	Aleppo City	Shakir al-Shabani	Sunni	
34	Aleppo City	Basim Qudsi	Sunni	
35	Aleppo City	Niqula Khanji	Armenian Orthodox	National Bloc
36	Aleppo City	Hrag Papazian	Armenian Orthodox	
37	Aleppo City	Henry Handiyeh	Armenian Catholic	
38	Aleppo City	Selim Janbart	Armenian Catholic	Independent
39	Aleppo City	Latif Ghanima	Syriac Catholic	National Bloc
40	Mount Simeon	Arif al-Jazzar	Sunni	
41	Mount Simeon	Tahir Abd al-Karim	Sunni	
42	Idlib	Nuri al-Asfari	Sunni	
43	Idlib	Sadiq al-Muallim	Sunni	
44	Al-Bab	Jamil Hilu	Sunni	
45	Harem	Najib Barmada	Sunni	
46	Manbij	Mahmoud Nadim	Sunni	
47	Jarabulus	Mustafa Shahin	Sunni	
48	Maarat al-Numan	Hikmat al-Hiraki	Sunni	Independent
49	Azaz	Minanyazi Jalousi Zada	Sunni	
50	Kurd Dagh	Hussein Awni	Sunni	
51	Jisr ash-Shughur	Zaki al-Najjari	Sunni	
52	Deir ez-Zor	Muhammad Nuri al-Futayh	Sunni	National Bloc
53	Deir ez-Zor	Fadel Al-Aboud	Sunni	
54	Raqqa	Ubayd Kaakaji	Sunni	
55	Raqqa	Hamid Khoja	Sunni	National Bloc
56	Mayadin	Abd al-Muhsin al-Hafl	Sunni	
57	Abu Kamal	Turki al-Mahmoud	Sunni	
58	Hasakah, Qamishli, and Tigris	Khalil Ibrahim Pasha	Sunni	
59	Hasakah, Qamishli, and Tigris	Said Ishaq	Syriac Orthodox	
60	Tribes of Deir ez-Zor - Anizah	Mujhim bin Miheid	Sunni	
61	Antioch	Muhammad Al Yahya	Alawite	
62	Antioch	Mustafa al-Qusayri	Alawite	
63	Antioch	Sadiq Maaruf	Alawite	
64	Antioch	Moses Derkaloustian	Armenian Orthodox	
65	Alexandretta	Muhammad Jurab	Alawite	
66	Qiriq Khan	Zadeh Khalil Agha	Sunni	
67	Tribes of the Aleppo Desert	Nawwaf al-Salih		
68	Shammar	Mayzar Abd al-Muhsin		

== By-elections ==
Electoral district	Date	Previous incumbent	Party	Winner	Party	Cause
Damascus and suburbs	1932	Muhammad Ali al-Abid	Independent			Resigned after being elected President of the Republic on 11 June 1932.
