= List of members of the 1949 Syrian Constituent Assembly =

This is a list of deputies elected to the Constituent Assembly, following the 1949 election. The Assembly subsequently transitioned into the 5th Chamber of Deputies, retaining the same membership.

== Deputies ==
No.	Electoral district		Name	Party
1	Damascus		Sami Kabbarah	Independent
2	Damascus		Mustafa al-Siba'i	Muslim Brotherhood
3	Damascus		Muhammad al-Mubarak	Muslim Brotherhood
4	Damascus		Hassan al-Hakim	Independent
5	Damascus		Aref al-Turuqji	
6	Damascus		Ali Bozo	People's Party
7	Damascus		Zaki al-Khatib	Independent
8	Damascus		Said Haydar	
9	Damascus		Munir al-Ajlani	Independent
10	Damascus		Issam al-Mahayiri	SSNP
11	Damascus		Subhi al-Umari	
12	Damascus		George Shalhub	People's Party
13	Damascus		Ilyas Dummar	
14	Douma		Mahmoud al-Azm	National Party
15	Douma		Hamid Naji	
16	Al-Nabek		Ibrahim Tayfur	
17	Al-Nabek		Abd al-Salam Haydar	
18	Al-Qutayfah		Muhammad Ata al-Jirudi	
19	Quneitra		Shakir al-Aas	People's Party
20	Quneitra		Asim Mahmoud	
21	Wadi al-Ajam		Hussein Maryud	Ba'ath Party
22	Al-Zabadani		Saleh Ramadan	
23	Aleppo		Nazim al-Qudsi	People's Party
24	Aleppo		Rushdi al-Kikhya	People's Party
25	Aleppo		Abdul-Wahab Hawmad	People's Party
26	Aleppo		Ahmad Qanbar	People's Party
27	Aleppo		Maarouf al-Dawalibi	People's Party
28	Aleppo		Abd al-Latif al-Sibahi	People's Party
29	Aleppo		Anwar Ibrahim Pasha	
30	Aleppo		Fathallah Asyun	People's Party
31	Aleppo		Latif Ghanima	People's Party
32	Aleppo		Rizqallah al-Antaki	People's Party
33	Aleppo		Rizqallah Salem	
34	Aleppo		Dikran Jerejian	People's Party
35	Mount Simeon		Izzat Ibrahim Pasha	People's Party
36	Mount Simeon		Muhammad Nadim al-Mallah	
37	Mount Simeon		Abd al-Aziz al-Hallaj	People's Party
38	Azaz		Jamil Baqi	
39	Azaz		Nafi' Bakkar	People's Party
40	Idlib		Abd al-Hamid al-Dweidari	
41	Idlib		Qadri al-Mufti	
42	Idlib		Muhammad al-Ashuri	
43	Manbij		Misbah al-Lubni	
44	Manbij		Abd al-Rahman al-Sayigh	
45	Harem		Nazim al-Kayyali	National Party
46	Harem		Adil al-Kikhya	
47	Jarabulus		Namiq Mustafa	
48	Maarat al-Numan		Hikmat al-Hiraki	Independent
49	Jisr ash-Shughur		Najdat al-Najjari	National Party
50	Al-Bab		Abd al-Wahhab Sukkar	
51	Al-Bab		Abd al-Qadir Rahmu	
52	Ayn al-Arab		Ismat Bozan Shahin	
53	Jabal al-Akrad		Faiq Manan Ismail Zadeh	
54	Jabal al-Akrad		Mustafa al-Battal	
55	Homs		Faydi al-Atassi	People's Party
56	Homs		Sami Tayyara	Arab Socialist Movement
57	Homs		Farhan al-Jandali	People's Party
58	Homs		Hani al-Sibai	People's Party
59	Homs		Abd al-Hasib Raslan	Independent
60	Homs		Ratib al-Husami	People's Party
61	Homs		Musallam al-Haddad	People's Party
62	Homs		Ihsan al-Hisni	
63	Hama and its district		Abd al-Rahman al-Azm	Independent
64	Hama and its district		Raif al-Malqi	Independent
65	Hama and its district		Husni al-Barazi	Independent
66	Hama and its district		Akram al-Hourani	Arab Socialist Movement
67	Hama and its district		Farid Marhaj	
68	Salamiyah		Abdullah al-Tamer	People's Party
69	Daraa		Mustafa al-Dukhan	
70	Daraa		Abd al-Latif al-Miqdad	Independent
71	Izraa		Muhammad Khayr al-Hariri	National Party
72	Al-Zawiya		Muhammad Youssef Abu Rumiyyah	
73	Deir ez-Zor		Qasim al-Hunaydi	
74	Deir ez-Zor		Qasim al-Ayish	
75	Deir ez-Zor		Jalal al-Sayyed	Arab Ba'ath Movement
76	Deir ez-Zor		Abd al-Aziz al-Harwil	
77	Mayadin		Abboud al-Jadaan	Independent
78	Abu Kamal		Dahham al-Dandal	Independent
79	Raqqa		Hamid al-Khoja	Independent
80	Raqqa		Faisal al-Huwaydi	Independent
81	Al-Hasakah		Abd al-Aziz al-Maslat	
82	Al-Hasakah		Abd al-Aziz Hasan	People's Party
83	Qamishli		Abd al-Baqi Nizam ad-Din	People's Party
84	Qamishli		Abd al-Razzaq al-Hasu	Independent
85	Qamishli		Said Ishaq	
86	Tigris		Fattah Mulla Sadiq	
87	Suwayda		Hasan al-Atrash	Independent
88	Salkhad		Hussein al-Shufi	
89	Shahba		Jadallah Izz al-Din	
90	Latakia City		Muhammad al-Shawwaf	People's Party
91	Latakia District		Yunis al-Naser	
92	Latakia District		Hanna Sawaya	
93	Al-Haffah		Ahmad Ali Kamil	Independent
94	Al-Haffah		Nuri al-Hajji	
95	Jableh		Ibrahim al-Kinj	
96	Jableh		Ali Asaad Ismail	
97	Baniyas		Muhammad Jamil al-Abdullah	
98	Masyaf		Muhammad Junayd	
99	Masyaf		Hamid Mansur al-Khadr	
100	Tartus		Anis Muhammad Ismail	
101	Tartus		Riyad Abd al-Razzaq	
102	Safita		Abd al-Latif al-Yunis	National Party
103	Safita		Khalil Bashur	
104	Talkalakh		Ali al-Dandashi	
105	Talkalakh		Esber al-Yaziji	
106	Bedouin nomadic tribes	Aleppo desert for al-Hadidiyin	Faisal al-Nawwaf al-Salih	
107	Bedouin nomadic tribes	Aleppo desert for al-Mawali	Abd al-Ibrahim	
108	Bedouin nomadic tribes	The Jazira desert for Shammar al-Kharsa	Dahham al-Hadi	
109	Bedouin nomadic tribes	The Jazira desert for Shammar al-Zour	Mayzar Abd al-Muhsin	
110	Bedouin nomadic tribes	Deir ez-Zor Desert	Nuri bin Miheid	
111	Bedouin nomadic tribes	Syrian Desert	Nayef al-Shaalan	
112	Bedouin nomadic tribes	Syrian Desert	Tamir al-Milhim	
113	Bedouin nomadic tribes	Jabal al-Druze Desert	Hayil al-Surur	
114	Bedouin nomadic tribes	Palmyra, Homs and Hama desert	Rakan al-Murshid	

== By-elections ==
Electoral district	Date	Previous incumbent	Party	Winner	Party	Cause
Azaz	December 1950	Nafi' Bakkar	People's Party	Nafi' Bakkar	People's Party	The 1949 election results for some polling stations in the Azaz electoral district were declared void, and a repeat election was called.
Daraa	December 1950	Abd al-Latif al-Miqdad		Muhammad al-Muflih al-Zoubi	Independent	The 1949 election results for some polling stations in the Daraa electoral district were declared void, and a repeat election was called.
Daraa	December 1950	Mustafa al-Dukhan		Muflih al-Mahamid		The 1949 election results for some polling stations in the Daraa electoral district were declared void, and a repeat election was called.
Tartus	December 1950	Anis Muhammad Ismail		Badi' Ismail	Independent	The election of Anis Muhammad Ismail in the 1949 election was declared void on 20 February 1950, and a repeat election was called.
Jableh	December 1950	Ibrahim al-Kinj		Uthman Hasan Esber	People's Party	The 1949 election results for the entire Jableh electoral district were declared void on 20 February 1950, and a repeat election was called.
Jableh	December 1950	Ali Asaad Ismail		Bahjat Nassur		The 1949 election results for the entire Jableh electoral district were declared void on 20 February 1950, and a repeat election was called.
Daraa	July 1951	Muhammad al-Muflih al-Zoubi	Independent	Muhammad al-Muflih al-Zoubi	Independent	The 1950 by-election results for some polling stations in the Daraa electoral district were declared void, and a repeat election was called.
Daraa	July 1951	Muflih al-Mahamid		Muflih al-Mahamid		The 1950 by-election results for some polling stations in the Daraa electoral district were declared void, and a repeat election was called.
