= List of members of the Chamber of Deputies (Syria), 1936–1939 =

This is a list of deputies elected to the 2nd Chamber of Deputies.

== Deputies ==
=== Elected in the 1936 parliamentary election ===
No.	Electoral district	Name	Religious affiliation	Party
1	Damascus and suburbs	Jamil Mardam Bey	Sunni	National Bloc
2	Damascus and suburbs	Lutfi al-Haffar	Sunni	National Bloc
3	Damascus and suburbs	Shukri al-Quwatli	Sunni	National Bloc
4	Damascus and suburbs	Ahmad al-Lahham	Sunni	National Bloc
5	Damascus and suburbs	Ihsan al-Sharif	Sunni	National Bloc
6	Damascus and suburbs	Nasib al-Bakri	Sunni	National Bloc
7	Damascus and suburbs	Fakhri al-Baroudi	Sunni	National Bloc
8	Damascus and suburbs	Munir al-Ajlani	Sunni	National Bloc
9	Damascus and suburbs	Sabri al-Asali	Sunni	National Bloc
10	Damascus and suburbs	Afif al-Sulh	Sunni	National Bloc
11	Damascus and suburbs	Fares al-Khoury	Not represented minorities	National Bloc
12	Damascus and suburbs	Fayez al-Khoury	Greek Orthodox	National Bloc
13	Damascus and suburbs	George Sahnawi	Roman Catholic	
14	Damascus and suburbs	Youssef Leniado	Jewish	Independent
15	Qalamoun	Muhammad Mahmoud Diab	Sunni	
16	Qalamoun	Muhammad Khair Aqil	Sunni	
17	Douma	Younes al-Khanshour	Sunni	
18	Douma	Ghneim Khayti	Sunni	
19	Wadi al-Ajam	Abu al-Huda al-Husaybi	Sunni	
20	Al-Zabadani	Jamil al-Shammat	Sunni	
21	Golan	Faour al-Faour	Sunni	Independent
22	Golan	Asim Mahmoud	Sunni	
23	Homs and suburbs	Hashim al-Atassi	Sunni	National Bloc
24	Homs and suburbs	Mazhar Raslan	Sunni	National Bloc
25	Homs and suburbs	Rafiq al-Husseini	Sunni	
26	Homs and suburbs	Suleiman al-Masrani	Sunni	
27	Homs and suburbs	Ibrahim al-Dahiya	Alawite	
28	Homs and suburbs	Abdullah Farkouh	Greek Orthodox	
29	Hama and suburbs	Najib al-Barazi	Sunni	National Bloc
30	Hama and suburbs	Tawfiq al-Shishakli	Sunni	
31	Hama and suburbs	Omar al-Dallal	Sunni	
32	Salamiyah	Emir Suleiman al-Ali	Ismaili	
33	Daraa	Muhammad al-Muflih al-Zoubi	Sunni	Independent
34	Daraa	Mustafa al-Miqdad	Sunni	
35	Izraa	Faris al-Zoubi	Sunni	
36	Izraa	Ismail al-Hariri	Sunni	
37	Damascus desert	Fawaz al-Shaalan	Sunni	
38	Damascus desert	Tarrad al-Melhem	Sunni	
39	Damascus desert	Rakan bin Murshid	Sunni	
40	Aleppo City	Saadallah al-Jabiri	Sunni	National Bloc
41	Aleppo City	Abd al-Rahman al-Kayyali	Sunni	National Bloc
42	Aleppo City	Hassan Fouad Ibrahim	Sunni	
43	Aleppo City	Abd al-Qadir al-Sarmini	Sunni	
44	Aleppo City	Nazim al-Qudsi	Sunni	National Bloc
45	Aleppo City	Rushdi al-Kikhya	Sunni	National Bloc
46	Aleppo City	Hrant Salahyat	Armenian Orthodox	
47	Aleppo City	Radrus Meltabashian	Armenian Orthodox	
48	Aleppo City	Fathallah Asyun	Armenian Catholic	National Bloc
49	Aleppo City	Edmond Al-Homsi	Armenian Catholic	National Bloc
50	Aleppo City	Edmond Rabat	Syriac Catholics	
51	Mount Simeon	Jamil Ibrahim Pasha	Sunni	National Bloc
52	Mount Simeon	Saad al-Din al-Jabiri	Sunni	
53	Mount Simeon	Abdul-Aziz al-Hallaj	Sunni	
54	Al-Bab	Abd al-Qadir Rahmu	Sunni	
55	Idlib	Hikmat al-Hakim	Sunni	National Bloc
56	Idlib	Wahid al-Dweidari	Sunni	
57	Idlib	Nuri al-Asfari	Sunni	
58	Idlib	Said al-Kayyali	Sunni	
59	Manbij	Hussein Hilmi	Sunni	
60	Jarabulus	Mustafa Shahin	Sunni	
61	Jarabulus	Bozan Shahin	Sunni	
62	Maarat al-Numan	Hikmat al-Hiraki	Sunni	Independent
63	Azaz	Muhammad Hadi al-Bakkar	Sunni	
64	Jabal al-Akrad	Hussein Awni	Sunni	
65	Tribes of Aleppo	Nawwaf al-Salih	Sunni	
66	Tribes of Aleppo	Shayesh bin Abdul-Karim	Sunni	
67	Deir ez-Zor	Muhammad al-Ayish	Sunni	Independent
68	Deir ez-Zor	Muhammad Nuri al-Futayh	Sunni	National Bloc
69	Deir ez-Zor	Said al-Arfi	Sunni	
70	Mayadin	Turki al-Najras	Sunni	National Bloc
71	Abu Kamal	Abd al-Hadi al-Zarzour	Sunni	
72	Raqqa	Mahawish Wahbi al-Ajeeli	Sunni	
73	Raqqa	Mujhim al-Bashir al-Huwaydi	Sunni	
74	Raqqa	Muhammad al-Farrah	Sunni	
75	Jazira	Qaddour al-Hajj Ali Bey	Sunni	
76	Jazira	Khalil Ibrahim Pasha	Sunni	
77	Jazira	Said Ishaq	Syriac Orthodox	
78	Jazira and Euphrates tribes	Mujhim bin Miheid	Sunni	
79	Jazira and Euphrates tribes	Dahham al-Hadi	Sunni	
80	Alexandretta	Dawoud Rihani	Alawite	
81	Antioch	Muhammad Al Yahya	Sunni	
82	Antioch	Mustafa al-Qusayri	Sunni	
83	Antioch	Sadiq Maaruf	Alawite	
84	Antioch	Moses Derkaloustian	Armenian Orthodox	
85	Qiriq Khan	Muhammad Pasha Bekzada	Sunni	

=== Elected in the 1937 parliamentary election ===
No.	Electoral district	Name	Religious affiliation	Party
86	Suwayda	N/A	Druze	
87	Suwayda	N/A	Not represented minorities	
88	Salkhad	N/A	Druze	
89	Shahba	N/A	Druze	
90	Jabal al-Druze tribes	N/A	Sunni	
91	Latakia	Abd al-Qadir Shreiteh	Sunni	
92	Latakia	Ali Shihab	Alawite	
93	Latakia	Fayez Elias	Not represented minorities	
94	Sahyun	Salman al-Murshid	Alawite	
95	Sahyun	Omar al-Bitar	Sunni	National Bloc
96	Masyaf	Muhammad Junayd	Alawite	
97	Masyaf	Muhammad Suleiman al-Ahmad	Alawite	National Bloc
98	Masyaf	Muhammad Hassan Asber	Alawite	
99	Masyaf	Janem Khaddour	Alawite	
100	Tartus	Mahmoud Abd al-Razzaq	Sunni	
101	Tartus	Muhammad al-Ismail	Alawite	
102	Safita	Munir al-Abbas	Alawite	Independent
103	Safita	Amin al-Raslan	Alawite	
104	Safita	Jabra al-Hilu	Greek Orthodox	
105	Talkalakh	Shawkat al-Abbas	Alawite	
106	Talkalakh	Elias Gerges	Greek Orthodox	

== By-elections ==
Electoral district	Date	Previous incumbent	Party	Winner	Party	Cause
Homs and suburbs	1937	Hashim al-Atassi	National Bloc	Mukarram al-Atassi	National Bloc	Resigned after being elected President of the Republic on 22 December 1936.
