= Uthman an-Naqqar =

Syrian economist and politician (born 1963)

- عثمان النقار

Member of the People's Assembly
- Incumbent
- Assumed office 5 October 2025
- Constituency: Hama

Personal details
- Born: Uthman Abdel-Qader an-Naqqar; 1963 (age 62–63) Hama, Syria
- Party: Independent
- Education: University of Aleppo (BA); University of Montpellier 1 (PhD)

Uthman Abdel-Qader an-Naqqar (Arabic: عثمان عبد القادر النقار; born 1963) is a Syrian economist, academic and politician who has served as a member of the People's Assembly for the constituency of Hama since October 2025. Prior, he pursued an academic career specializing in quantitative economics, statistics, and management information systems, serving as a professor at several Syrian and Saudi universities and later as Vice President for Scientific Affairs and Scientific Research at Hama University.

== Biography ==
An-Naqqar was born in 1963 in Hama, Syria. He graduated with a bachelor's degree in economics, specializing in statistics, from the University of Aleppo in 1986. In 1994, he received a PhD in economic sciences from the University of Montpellier 1 in France, specializing in information processing and quantitative methods.

He began his academic career in 1987 as a teaching assistant in the Department of Statistics at the Faculty of Economics, University of Damascus. After completing his doctoral studies, he was appointed lecturer in the Department of Applied Statistics in 1995. Between 1995 and 2003, he taught at Al-Baath University before being seconded to Qassim University in Saudi Arabia, where he spent five years teaching in the Department of Management Information Systems within the College of Economics and Administration. During his academic career, he authored and co-authored several university textbooks and scholarly works in statistics, computer science, and economic and administrative mathematics.

Following the outbreak of the Syrian revolution in 2011, an-Naqqar continued his academic work in government-controlled Syria. After the establishment of Hama University in 2014, he joined its Faculty of Economics, where he was promoted to the rank of associate professor and later served as Vice Dean of the Faculty of Economics for Scientific Affairs. He became recognized for his work in quantitative economics and management information systems.

After the fall of the Assad regime in December 2024, an-Naqqar was appointed Vice President of Hama University for Scientific Affairs and Scientific Research. He subsequently contested the 2025 parliamentary election as a candidate for the Hama constituency and was elected to the People's Assembly on October 2025.
