= Salamiyah and al-Qaryatayn (Chamber of Deputies electoral district) =

Former electoral district of Syria's national legislature

- Former electoral district for the Chamber of Deputies

Former electoral district
- Created: 1931
- Abolished: 1936
- Seats: 2 (1931–1936)
- Replaced by: Al-Qaryatayn; Salamiyah

Salamiyah and al-Qaryatayn (Arabic: سلمية والقريتين) was an electoral district used to elect members of the Syrian Chamber of Deputies between 1931 and 1936.

== Electoral system ==
Under the 1928 electoral system, Syria adopted its first formal electoral law after the Ottoman period and under the French Mandate. Promulgated by arrêté No. 1889 of High Commissioner Ponsot, the system created a two-tier indirect electoral system. Male citizens over the age of 21 would elect electors who would then elect the members of parliament. The number of seats was set before every election and based on the proportional population size of each electoral district. The system was criticised for entrenching the influence of local notables, elites, and landowners, as the system resulted in limited direct popular influence.

== Deputies ==
Elections	Deputy (Party)	Deputy (Party)
1931–32	Suleiman Mirza (N/A)	Ahmad Abd al-Rahman (N/A)
