= Hama (former People's Assembly electoral district) =

Former electoral district of Syria's national legislature

- Former electoral district for the People's Assembly
- Location of Hama within Syria
- Governorate: Hama
- Population: 1,628,000 (2011)
- Area: 8,883 km^{2}

Former electoral district
- Created: 1973
- Abolished: 2025
- Seats: List: 22 (1990–2025); 17 (1977–1990); 16 (1973–1977)
- Created from: List: Al-Saan; Hama; Masyaf; Salamiyah
- Replaced by: List: As-Salamiyah; As-Suqaylabiyah; Hama; Masyaf; Mharda

Hama (Arabic: حماة) was an electoral district used to elect members of the Syrian People's Assembly between 1973 and 2025.

== Electoral system ==
The electoral system used to elect the People's Assembly was introduced in 1973 and remained in use until the assembly's dissolution in 2025. Each governorate formed a single, large electoral district, except for Aleppo Governorate, which was divided into two districts: the city of Aleppo and the rural districts of Aleppo Governorate. Within each district, seats were awarded on a block-vote basis, with the candidates receiving the largest number of votes taking all of the seats allocated to it, and the assembly was composed of representatives of two sectors, "workers and peasants" and "other sectors of the people", with the former guaranteed at least half of its seats nationally. The number of seats, and their distribution among districts, was left to the president of the republic to set by decree rather than being fixed in law; the total was raised from 186 to 195 in 1981 and from 195 to 250 in 1990, after which the distribution among the fifteen electoral districts was not changed.

All Syrian citizens aged 18 and over were entitled to vote, other than those under legal guardianship, those with a mental illness affecting their legal capacity, and those convicted of a felony or a "dishonourable" misdemeanour, while serving members of the armed forces and police were barred from voting and from standing as candidates; candidates were further required to be at least 25 years old and to have held Syrian nationality for at least five years, a period raised to ten under the 2011 and 2014 electoral laws. During the 2011 reform of the electoral law, the replacement of this system was discussed because of its weak representativeness, but the large-district, block-vote system was retained; the reform instead moved the administration of elections from the Ministry of Interior and provincial governors to an independent Supreme Judicial Committee for Elections, a structure carried over into a further law passed in 2014 that consolidated the rules for presidential, parliamentary and local-council elections into a single statute.

Beyond being considered unrepresentative — a majoritarian, large-district system of a kind rejected by most electoral systems worldwide — the system has also been criticised for the unevenness of its distribution of seats between governorates. Based on the number of registered voters at the 2012 election, the average was around 59,000 voters per seat nationally, but the ratio varied considerably: about 37,800 voters per seat in Damascus and 51,500 in Tartus, compared with 71,700 in Al-Hasakah and 69,500 in the rural districts of Aleppo Governorate, with no mechanism beyond a presidential decree governing the size of constituencies or the allocation of seats between them.

== Members ==
| Elections | MPA (Party) | MPA (Party) | MPA (Party) | MPA (Party) | MPA (Party) | MPA (Party) | MPA (Party) | MPA (Party) | MPA (Party) | MPA (Party) | MPA (Party) | MPA (Party) | MPA (Party) | MPA (Party) | MPA (Party) | MPA (Party) | MPA (Party) | MPA (Party) | MPA (Party) | MPA (Party) | MPA (Party) | MPA (Party) |
|---|---|---|---|---|---|---|---|---|---|---|---|---|---|---|---|---|---|---|---|---|---|---|
| 1973 | Hussein al-Hussein (N/A) | George Harika (N/A) | Ibrahim Haydar (N/A) | Muhammad Jumaa Taftanazi (N/A) | Muhammad Eid Latmini (N/A) | Mahmoud Khairbek (N/A) | Mustafa al-Hamud (N/A) | Rashid Issa (N/A) | Abd al-Salam al-Qasim (N/A) | Muhammad Wahud (N/A) | Abd al-Ilah Hawwat (N/A) | Fayez Issa (N/A) | Munawwer Makhlouta (N/A) | Ali Nabhan (N/A) | Yahya Ardouk (N/A) | Mahmoud Arwani (N/A) | 16 seats | | | | | |
| 1974 by-election | Hussein al-Hussein (N/A) | Michel Risha (N/A) | Ibrahim Haydar (N/A) | Muhammad Jumaa Taftanazi (N/A) | Muhammad Eid Latmini (N/A) | Mahmoud Khairbek (N/A) | Mustafa al-Hamud (N/A) | Rashid Issa (N/A) | Abd al-Salam al-Qasim (N/A) | Muhammad Wahud (N/A) | Abd al-Ilah Hawwat (N/A) | Fayez Issa (N/A) | Munawwer Makhlouta (N/A) | Ali Nabhan (N/A) | Yahya Ardouk (N/A) | Mahmoud Arwani (N/A) | 16 seats | | | | | |
| 1977 | Khalil Mahfoud (N/A) | Abd al-Karim Maat al-Ismail (N/A) | Ibrahim Haydar (N/A) | Muhammad Jumaa Taftanazi (N/A) | Abd al-Mu’in Fatraoui (N/A) | Mahmoud Khairbek (N/A) | Mustafa Shakoush (N/A) | Rashid Issa (N/A) | Mustafa Halabiya (N/A) | Hamed Hassan (N/A) | Abd al-Ilah Hawwat (N/A) | Souad al-Sheikh Bakkour (N/A) | Aziz Yaqub (N/A) | Ali Nabhan (N/A) | Yahya Ardouk (N/A) | Abd al-Majid al-Zaeem (N/A) | Irfan Alloush (N/A) | 17 seats | | | | |
| 1981 | Khalil Mahfoud (N/A) | Muhammad Eid Latmini (N/A) | Ahmad al-Ahmad (N/A) | Asaad al-Mustafa (N/A) | Hassan Ghali (N/A) | Mahmoud Khairbek (N/A) | Mustafa Shakoush (N/A) | Michel Richa (N/A) | Marwan al-Ibrahim (N/A) | Hamed Hassan (N/A) | Ghasoun Murad Agha (N/A) | Walid Hamdoun (Ba'ath) | Adib Youssef (N/A) | Hikmat Fardawi (N/A) | Munawwer Makhlouta (N/A) | Mohsen Maalla (N/A) | Abd al-Wahhab Sattam Saffaf (N/A) | 17 seats | | | | |
| 1986 | Khalil Mahfoud (N/A) | Ibrahim Zaarour (N/A) | Ahmad al-Ahmad (N/A) | Amin al-Bakir (N/A) | Hassan Ghali (N/A) | Mahmoud Khairbek (N/A) | Ahmad al-Hadid (N/A) | Michel Richa (N/A) | Muhammad al-Abboud (N/A) | Youssef al-Khalifa (N/A) | Ghasoun Murad Agha (N/A) | Walid Hamdoun (Ba'ath) | Ahmad al-Ali (N/A) | Hikmat Fardawi (N/A) | Munawwer Makhlouta (N/A) | Ahmad al-Khattab (N/A) | Muhammad Habbal (N/A) | 17 seats | | | | |
| 1990 | Hussein Murshid Hussein (N/A) | Ibrahim Zaarour (N/A) | Fatima al-Saqqa (N/A) | Amin al-Bakir (N/A) | Fatima al-Jaha (N/A) | Mustafa Issa (N/A) | Ahmad al-Asaad (N/A) | Michel Richa (N/A) | Mahmoud Hammoud (N/A) | Ibrahim Haydar (N/A) | Abd al-Karim al-Ismail (Ind.) | Walid Hamdoun (Ba'ath) | Ahmad al-Ali (N/A) | Mazoud al-Jassem (N/A) | Mujib Salama (N/A) | Ahmad al-Khattab (N/A) | Walid Jad’an (N/A) | Muhammad Shams al-Din Qanout (N/A) | Muhammad Adnan Suleiman (N/A) | Hassan Sabbahi (N/A) | Louay al-Hilu (N/A) | Hussein Muhammad Hussein (N/A) |
| 1994 | Amin Asfar (N/A) | Jawid Salama (N/A) | Khalil Mahfoud (N/A) | Jamila Fallaheh (N/A) | Ahmad al-Ahmad (N/A) | Mustafa Issa (N/A) | Younes Salami (N/A) | Hussein al-Hussein (N/A) | Hassan Hassan (N/A) | Ibrahim Khalil (N/A) | Abd al-Karim al-Ismail (Ind.) | Walid Hamdoun (Ba'ath) | Mustafa Abd al-Rahman (N/A) | Abd al-Wahhab Sultan (N/A) | Mamoun al-Jarf (N/A) | Souad al-Sheikh Bakkour (Ba'ath) | Adnan Kizawi (N/A) | Ghassan Othman (N/A) | Yassin Waqqaf (N/A) | Hassan Sabbahi (N/A) | Abd al-Qadir Mustafa (N/A) | Ahmad al-Amouri (N/A) |
| 1998 | Amin Asfar (N/A) | Ibrahim Jirjanazi (N/A) | Sudayf al-Assad (N/A) | Jawdat Afour (N/A) | Ahmad al-Ahmad (N/A) | Muhammad Said (N/A) | Ibrahim Abbas (N/A) | Hussein al-Hussein (N/A) | Faten al-Sheikh Khaled (N/A) | Ibrahim Khalil (N/A) | Abd al-Karim al-Ismail (Ind.) | Ibrahim Ali Ibrahim (N/A) | Mustafa Abd al-Rahman (N/A) | Mahmoud Arwani (N/A) | Younes al-Saleh (N/A) | Souad al-Sheikh Bakkour (Ba'ath) | Fadi Ayyash (N/A) | Bahjat Assad (N/A) | Bashar al-Halabiyah (N/A) | Ahmad al-Khattab (N/A) | Mayad Yaqub (N/A) | Khaled Muhammad (Ind.) |
| 2003 | Nadim Maryam (Ba'ath) | Sameer Qandaji (N/A) | Kulthoum Wardeh (Ba'ath) | Ahmad al-Shami (N/A) | Abd al-Hadi Abd al-Karim (N/A) | Muhammad Said (N/A) | Seifo Ahmad (N/A) | Abd al-Karim al-Ismail (Ind.) | Hashem al-Zaeem (N/A) | Ibrahim Khalil (N/A) | Jihad Murad (Ba'ath) | Ibrahim Ali Ibrahim (N/A) | Hussein Farzat (ASM) | Younes Nassif (N/A) | Walid Fares (N/A) | Souad al-Sheikh Bakkour (Ba'ath) | Faisal Kulthoum (N/A) | Mona Salameh (N/A) | Ibrahim al-Asmar (Ind.) | Ahmad al-Khattab (N/A) | Muhammad al-Hamido (N/A) | Khaled Muhammad (Ind.) |
| 2007 | Nadim Maryam (Ba'ath) | Sahar al-Hassoun (Ba'ath) | Kulthoum Wardeh (Ba'ath) | Matanyous Issa (Ba'ath) | Bilal Deeb (Ba'ath) | Nouri al-Hamoud al-Hassan al-Khalil (SUP) | Akram Hour (NCP) | Abd al-Karim al-Ismail (Ind.) | Abd al-Aziz al-Hassan (Ba'ath) | Ibrahim al-Khalil (Ind.) | Jihad Murad (Ba'ath) | Hashem Isbar (Ind.) | Maan Ali (Ba'ath) | Bashar Junaid (Ba'ath) | Muhammad Said Tabash (Ba'ath) | Souad al-Sheikh Bakkour (Ba'ath) | Joseph al-Maghout (Ba'ath) | Ghazi al-Khattab (SUP) | Ibrahim al-Asmar (Ind.) | Ali al-Amouri (Ind.) | Fouad al-Shalli (Ind.) | Khaled Muhammad (Ind.) |
| 2012 | Ali al-Sheikh Haidar (SSNP) | Nawras Mirza (SSNP) | Abd al-Rahman Azkahi (ASUP) | Hamed Ibrahim (Ba'ath) | Bilal Deeb (Ba'ath) | Nizar Musa (Ba'ath) | Maher Qawarma (Ba'ath) | Muhammad al-Ghada (Ba'ath) | Basem Ibrahim (Ind.) | Abd al-Karim al-Sabsabi (Until 2016: Ind. From 2016: Ba'ath) | Ali Rustum (Ind.) | Ghada Ibrahim (Until 2016: Ind. From 2016: Ba'ath) | Yasser al-Bakir (Ind.) | Bashar Junaid (Ba'ath) | Akram Khalil (Ba'ath) | Ayman Malandi (Ba'ath) | Waris al-Younis (Ba'ath) | Salam Sanqar (Ba'ath) | Mohsen Ghazi (Ba'ath) | Mahmoud Jokhdar (Ba'ath) | Muhammad Wael Ajneid (NCP) | Akram Hawash (Ind.) |
| 2012 by-election | Ali al-Sheikh Haidar (SSNP) | Nawras Mirza (SSNP) | Abd al-Rahman Azkahi (ASUP) | Hamed Ibrahim (Ba'ath) | Bilal Deeb (Ba'ath) | Fadel Warda (Ba'ath) | Maher Qawarma (Ba'ath) | Muhammad al-Ghada (Ba'ath) | Basem Ibrahim (Ind.) | Abd al-Karim al-Sabsabi (Until 2016: Ind. From 2016: Ba'ath) | Ali Rustum (Ind.) | Ghada Ibrahim (Until 2016: Ind. From 2016: Ba'ath) | Yasser al-Bakir (Ind.) | Bashar Junaid (Ba'ath) | Akram Khalil (Ba'ath) | Ayman Malandi (Ba'ath) | Waris al-Younis (Ba'ath) | Salam Sanqar (Ba'ath) | Mohsen Ghazi (Ba'ath) | Mahmoud Jokhdar (Ba'ath) | Muhammad Wael Ajneid (NCP) | Akram Hawash (Ind.) |
| 2014 by-election | Ali al-Sheikh Haidar (SSNP) | Nawras Mirza (SSNP) | Abd al-Rahman Azkahi (ASUP) | Hamed Ibrahim (Ba'ath) | Bilal Deeb (Ba'ath) | Fadel Warda (Ba'ath) | Maher Qawarma (Ba'ath) | Muhammad al-Ghada (Ba'ath) | Basem Ibrahim (Ind.) | Abd al-Karim al-Sabsabi (Until 2016: Ind. From 2016: Ba'ath) | Ali Rustum (Ind.) | Ghada Ibrahim (Until 2016: Ind. From 2016: Ba'ath) | Yasser al-Bakir (Ind.) | Bashar Junaid (Ba'ath) | Akram Khalil (Ba'ath) | Ayman Malandi (Ba'ath) | Khader al-Saleh (Ba'ath) | Salam Sanqar (Ba'ath) | Mohsen Ghazi (Ba'ath) | Mahmoud Jokhdar (Ba'ath) | Muhammad Wael Ajneid (NCP) | Akram Hawash (Ind.) |
| 2016 | Hamed Hassan (Ba'ath) | Hussein Abbas (Ba'ath) | Abd al-Rahman Azkahi (ASUP) | Abd al-Karim al-Ismail (Ind.) | Muhammad Alloush Jughaili (Ba'ath) | Fadel Warda (Ba'ath) | Maher Qawarma (Ba'ath) | Mahmoud al-Abd al-Salam (Ba'ath) | Badee al-Hussein (Ind.) | Abd al-Karim al-Sabsabi (Until 2016: Ind. From 2016: Ba'ath) | Jamal Youssef (Ind.) | Ghada Ibrahim (Until 2016: Ind. From 2016: Ba'ath) | Mazen Azzouz (SSNP) | Abd al-Karim al-Bakir (Ba'ath) | Maher Labad (Ba'ath) | Ayman Malandi (Ba'ath) | Khader al-Saleh (Ba'ath) | Salam Sanqar (Ba'ath) | Muhammad al-Aji (Ba'ath) | Mahmoud Jokhdar (Ba'ath) | Dawlat al-Murshid (Ind.) | Waddah Murad (Ind.) |
| 2018 by-election | Hamed Hassan (Ba'ath) | Hussein Abbas (Ba'ath) | Abd al-Rahman Azkahi (ASUP) | Abd al-Karim al-Ismail (Ind.) | Muhammad Alloush Jughaili (Ba'ath) | Fadel Warda (Ba'ath) | Maher Qawarma (Ba'ath) | Mahmoud al-Abd al-Salam (Ba'ath) | Badee al-Hussein (Ind.) | Abd al-Karim al-Sabsabi (Until 2016: Ind. From 2016: Ba'ath) | Jamal Youssef (Ind.) | Ghada Ibrahim (Until 2016: Ind. From 2016: Ba'ath) | Mazen Azzouz (SSNP) | Abd al-Karim al-Bakir (Ba'ath) | Maher Labad (Ba'ath) | Ayman Malandi (Ba'ath) | Basim al-Naameh (Ba'ath) | Salam Sanqar (Ba'ath) | Muhammad al-Aji (Ba'ath) | Mahmoud Jokhdar (Ba'ath) | Dawlat al-Murshid (Ind.) | Waddah Murad (Ind.) |
| 2020 | Muhammad Sharabi (Ba'ath) | Hussein Abbas (Ba'ath) | Abd al-Rahman Azkahi (ASUP) | Abd al-Karim al-Ismail (Ind.) | Mustafa Khalil (Ba'ath) | Fadel Warda (Ba'ath) | Maher Qawarma (Ba'ath) | Mustafa al-Mustafa (Ba'ath) | Mohsen Ghazi (Ba'ath) | Fayez al-Ahmad (Ba'ath) | Orouba Mahfoud (Ind.) | Ghada Ibrahim (Until 2016: Ind. From 2016: Ba'ath) | Muhammad Sharif Abd al-Karim (Ind.) | Issam Sabbahi (Ba'ath) | Yaghi Ali (Ba'ath) | Ayman Malandi (Ba'ath) | Basim al-Naameh (Ba'ath) | Salam Sanqar (Ba'ath) | Issa Wassouf (Ba'ath) | Sariyah Qassem (ADUP) | Abd al-Kafi Aqdeh (Ind.) | Asaad Halloum (Ind.) |
| 2024 | Muhammad Sharabi (Ba'ath) | Ikhlas Farran (Ba'ath) | Hammam Dibyat (Ba'ath) | Abd al-Karim al-Ismail (Ind.) | Mustafa Khalil (Ba'ath) | Yahya al-Asfar (ADUP) | Maher Qawarma (Ba'ath) | Mustafa al-Mustafa (Ba'ath) | Ali Abboud (Ba'ath) | Fadi al-Abbas (Ba'ath) | Orouba Mahfoud (Ind.) | Saeed al-Awadh (Ba'ath) | Ali al-Amouri (Ind.) | Issam Sabbahi (Ba'ath) | Ghazwan al-Salmoni (Ba'ath) | Ayman Malandi (Ba'ath) | Ali Barakat (Ba'ath) | Hassan al-Qassem (Ba'ath) | Issa Wassouf (Ba'ath) | Abdul-Aziz Othman (NCP) | Yousef al-Asfar (Ind.) | Mahdi al-Ali (Ind.) |
