= Al-Hasakah (former People's Assembly electoral district) =

Former electoral district of Syria's national legislature

- Former electoral district for the People's Assembly
- Location of Al-Hasakah within Syria
- Governorate: Al-Hasakah
- Population: 1,512,000 (2011)
- Area: 23,334 km^{2}

Former electoral district
- Created: 1973
- Abolished: 2025
- Seats: List: 14 (1990–2025); 11 (1977–1990); 10 (1973–1977)
- Created from: List: Al-Hasakah; Al-Malikiyah; Al-Shaddadi; Qamishli
- Replaced by: List: Al-Hasakah; Al-Malikiyah; Ras al-Ayn; Qamishli

Al-Hasakah (Arabic: الحسكة) was an electoral district used to elect members of the Syrian People's Assembly between 1973 and 2025.

== Electoral system ==
The electoral system used to elect the People's Assembly was introduced in 1973 and remained in use until the assembly's dissolution in 2025. Each governorate formed a single, large electoral district, except for Aleppo Governorate, which was divided into two districts: the city of Aleppo and the rural districts of Aleppo Governorate. Within each district, seats were awarded on a block-vote basis, with the candidates receiving the largest number of votes taking all of the seats allocated to it, and the assembly was composed of representatives of two sectors, "workers and peasants" and "other sectors of the people", with the former guaranteed at least half of its seats nationally. The number of seats, and their distribution among districts, was left to the president of the republic to set by decree rather than being fixed in law; the total was raised from 186 to 195 in 1981 and from 195 to 250 in 1990, after which the distribution among the fifteen electoral districts was not changed.

All Syrian citizens aged 18 and over were entitled to vote, other than those under legal guardianship, those with a mental illness affecting their legal capacity, and those convicted of a felony or a "dishonourable" misdemeanour, while serving members of the armed forces and police were barred from voting and from standing as candidates; candidates were further required to be at least 25 years old and to have held Syrian nationality for at least five years, a period raised to ten under the 2011 and 2014 electoral laws. During the 2011 reform of the electoral law, the replacement of this system was discussed because of its weak representativeness, but the large-district, block-vote system was retained; the reform instead moved the administration of elections from the Ministry of Interior and provincial governors to an independent Supreme Judicial Committee for Elections, a structure carried over into a further law passed in 2014 that consolidated the rules for presidential, parliamentary and local-council elections into a single statute.

Beyond being considered unrepresentative — a majoritarian, large-district system of a kind rejected by most electoral systems worldwide — the system has also been criticised for the unevenness of its distribution of seats between governorates. Based on the number of registered voters at the 2012 election, the average was around 59,000 voters per seat nationally, but the ratio varied considerably: about 37,800 voters per seat in Damascus and 51,500 in Tartus, compared with 71,700 in Al-Hasakah and 69,500 in the rural districts of Aleppo Governorate, with no mechanism beyond a presidential decree governing the size of constituencies or the allocation of seats between them.

== Members ==
Elections	MPA (Party)	MPA (Party)	MPA (Party)	MPA (Party)	MPA (Party)	MPA (Party)	MPA (Party)	MPA (Party)	MPA (Party)	MPA (Party)	MPA (Party)	MPA (Party)	MPA (Party)	MPA (Party)
1973	Khidr al-Ali (N/A)	Husayn al-Judan (N/A)	Muhammad al-Ali (N/A)	Othman Muhammad (N/A)	Mahmoud al-Fadil (N/A)	Hanna Jurjur (N/A)	Farid Barsum (N/A)	Khalaf al-Azzawi (N/A)	Abdullah al-Suwailih (N/A)	Suleiman Hajju (N/A)	10 seats			
1977	Abd al-Latif al-Ali (N/A)	Muhammad al-Hawar (N/A)	Muhammad al-Ali (N/A)	Maktaa Twaisan (N/A)	Yassin al-Khalaf (N/A)	Hussein al-Omar (N/A)	Abd al-Aziz al-Nuaimi (N/A)	Farah al-Taan (N/A)	Yaqub Halawaji (N/A)	Aboud Khalif Majoul (N/A)	Boghos Siraj (N/A)	11 seats		
1981	Daoud Soumi (N/A)	Mahmoud al-Hassan (Ba'ath)	Nasser al-Amadi (N/A)	Mazen Sabbagh (N/A)	Omar Daoud (N/A)	Suleiman al-Jinaa (N/A)	Sameera Jibrail (N/A)	Khalaf al-Azzawi (N/A)	Ahmad al-Abdallah (N/A)	Abd al-Karim Kadda (N/A)	Abd al-Wahhab al-Issa (N/A)	11 seats		
1986	Ahmad al-Abdallah (N/A)	Mahmoud al-Hassan (Ba'ath)	Muhammad al-Ali (N/A)	Abd al-Majid Hassan (N/A)	Malak Hanna (N/A)	Suleiman al-Jinaa (N/A)	Abd al-Rahman Issa (N/A)	Khalaf al-Azzawi (N/A)	Muhammad Haitham Dweihi (N/A)	Sameera Jibrail (N/A)	Abd al-Wahhab al-Issa (N/A)	11 seats		
1990	Ahmad al-Abdallah (N/A)	Mahmoud al-Hassan (Ba'ath)	Mahmoud al-Fadel (N/A)	Hamad al-Suhaian (N/A)	Ibrahim Abdallah (N/A)	Mahmoud Dawoud (N/A)	Fuad Aliko (N/A)	Mahmoud al-Boursan (N/A)	Muhammad Haitham Dweihi (N/A)	Sameera Jibrail (N/A)	Elias Abd Laki (N/A)	Kamal Darwish (N/A)	Abd al-Hamid Haj Mousa (N/A)	Bashir Saadi (N/A)
1994	Youssef Ahmad (Ba'ath)	Mahmoud al-Hassan (Ba'ath)	Munifa Darwish (N/A)	Muhammad al-Ali (N/A)	Hamed al-Jassem (N/A)	Muhammad Haitham Dweihi (N/A)	Muhammad Abd al-Rahman (N/A)	Mahmoud al-Boursan (N/A)	Fawaz al-Daqouri (N/A)	Ibrahim Abdallah (N/A)	Abd al-Ahad Safar (N/A)	Hamad al-Zaher (N/A)	Muhammad al-Musalat (N/A)	Ziya Malek Ismail (Ind.)
1998	Faeq Ramo (N/A)	Asaad al-Sahou (N/A)	Abd al-Rahman al-Awwad (N/A)	Muhammad al-Ali (N/A)	Hamed al-Jassem (N/A)	Alaa al-Din al-Hamad (N/A)	Abd al-Aziz al-Issa (N/A)	Ahmad Hussein Hassan (N/A)	Muhammad Haitham Dweihi (N/A)	Najwa Tushan (N/A)	Abd al-Ahad Safar (N/A)	Abd al-Rahman Abd al-Karim (N/A)	Sameer Mustafa Pasha (N/A)	Ziya Malek Ismail (Ind.)
2003	Nasser Abd al-Aziz (N/A)	Ahmad al-Attiya (N/A)	Abdallah Bazou (N/A)	Muhammad al-Ali (N/A)	Hamoud al-Shabib (N/A)	Elizabeth Maliki (N/A)	Muhammad Shams al-Din (N/A)	Hussein al-Muhammad (N/A)	Ali al-Aazel (N/A)	Shifan al-Ali (N/A)	Suhail Arousi (N/A)	Issam Baghdadi (N/A)	Muhammad al-Musallat al-Melhem (Ind.)	Hatem al-Zaher (N/A)
2007	Abdallah Khalil (SCP-B)	Taha Shalash (Ba'ath)	Hammouda Sabbagh (Ba'ath)	Abboud al-Shawakh (Ba'ath)	Hammad al-Saud (Ba'ath)	Najah Kouriya (Ba'ath)	Sattam al-Dandah (Ba'ath)	Khalaf al-Fallaj (Ba'ath)	Ahmad al-Wakkaa (Ba'ath)	Abd al-Rahman Issa (SUP)	Muhammad Abd al-Rahman (Ind.)	Abd al-Razzaq al-Issa (Ind.)	Muhammad al-Musallat al-Melhem (Ind.)	Ziya Malek Ismail (Ind.)
2012	Catherine Deeb (ASUP)	Hamed al-Jassim (Ba'ath)	Hammouda Sabbagh (Ba'ath)	Abboud al-Shawakh (Ba'ath)	Hammad al-Saud (Ba'ath)	Saeed Elia (Ba'ath)	Sattam al-Dandah (Ba'ath)	Adnan Suleiman (Ba'ath)	Alaa al-Din al-Hamad (Ind.)	Abdul Rahman Issa (ASUP)	Khaled al-Atiyah (Ba'ath)	Muhammad al-Hilu (Ind.)	Hussein al-Muhammad (Ind.)	Muhammad al-Ta'ee (Ind.)
2012 by-election	Catherine Deeb (ASUP)	Hamed al-Jassim (Ba'ath)	Hammouda Sabbagh (Ba'ath)	Abboud al-Shawakh (Ba'ath)	Hammad al-Saud (Ba'ath)	Saeed Elia (Ba'ath)	Saleh al-Huwaija (Ba'ath)	Adnan Suleiman (Ba'ath)	Alaa al-Din al-Hamad (Ind.)	Abdul Rahman Issa (ASUP)	Khaled al-Atiyah (Ba'ath)	Amira al-Ghanim (Ind.)	Hussein al-Muhammad (Ind.)	Muhammad al-Ta'ee (Ind.)
2015 by-election	Catherine Deeb (ASUP)	Hamed al-Jassim (Ba'ath)	Hammouda Sabbagh (Ba'ath)	Abboud al-Shawakh (Ba'ath)	Hammad al-Saud (Ba'ath)	Nidal Eshu (Ba'ath)	Saleh al-Huwaija (Ba'ath)	Adnan Suleiman (Ba'ath)	Alaa al-Din al-Hamad (Ind.)	Abdul Rahman Issa (ASUP)	Khaled al-Atiyah (Ba'ath)	Amira al-Ghanim (Ind.)	Hussein al-Muhammad (Ind.)	Muhammad al-Ta'ee (Ind.)
2016	Maloul al-Hussein (SCP-U)	Hassan Salloumi (Ba'ath)	Hammouda Sabbagh (Ba'ath)	Abboud al-Shawakh (Ba'ath)	Hammad al-Saud (Ba'ath)	Nour Durrah (Ba'ath)	Reem al-Saai (Ind.)	Adnan Suleiman (Ba'ath)	Alaa al-Din al-Hamad (Ind.)	Riyadh Tawaz (Ba'ath)	Khaled al-Atiyah (Ba'ath)	Abd al-Muhaymid (Ba'ath)	Hassan al-Musallat (Ind.)	Muhammad Abd al-Rahman (Ind.)
2020	Muhammad al-Fallaj (Ba'ath)	Hassan Salloumi (Ba'ath)	Hammouda Sabbagh (Ba'ath)	Abboud al-Shawakh (Ba'ath)	Abd al-Rahman Khalil (SCP-U)	Nour Durrah (Ba'ath)	Khaled al-Hussein al-Hammadeh (Ba'ath)	Ali al-Jadha'an (Ba'ath)	Alaa al-Din al-Hamad (Ind.)	Muhammad al-Shammam (Ind.)	Khaled al-Atiyah (Ba'ath)	Talal al-Khalil (Ba'ath)	Hassan al-Musallat (Ind.)	Abd al-Hamid al-Zaher (Ind.)
2024	Abdullah al-Salmo (Ba'ath)	Hassan Salloumi (Ba'ath)	Hammouda Sabbagh (Ba'ath)	Abboud al-Shawakh (Ba'ath)	Bashar Suleiman (Ba'ath)	Nour Durrah (Ba'ath)	Khaled al-Hussein al-Hammadeh (Ba'ath)	Ali al-Jadha'an (Ba'ath)	Alaa al-Din al-Hamad (Ind.)	Sattam al-Jarbou (Ind.)	Khaled al-Atiyah (Ba'ath)	Muhammad Amin Musallat (Ba'ath)	Hassan al-Musallat (Ind.)	Rihab al-Mustafa (SUP)
