= Al-Qaryatayn (Chamber of Deputies electoral district) =

Former electoral district of Syria's national legislature

- Former electoral district for the Constituent Assembly

Former electoral district
- Created: 1928
- Abolished: 1931
- Seats: 1 (1928–1931)
- Replaced by: Salamiyah and al-Qaryatayn

Al-Qaryatayn (Arabic: القريتين) was an electoral district used to elect members of the Syrian Constituent Assembly between 1928 and 1931.

== Electoral system ==
Under the 1928 electoral system, Syria adopted its first formal electoral law after the Ottoman period and under the French Mandate. Promulgated by arrêté No. 1889 of High Commissioner Ponsot, the system created a two-tier indirect electoral system. Male citizens over the age of 21 would elect electors who would then elect the members of parliament. The number of seats was set before every election and based on the proportional population size of each electoral district. The system was criticised for entrenching the influence of local notables, elites, and landowners, as the system resulted in limited direct popular influence.

== Deputies ==
Elections	Deputy (Party)
1928	Ahmad al-Fayyad (N/A)
