= 1st Chamber of Deputies of Syria =

Legislative term of Syria's parliament from 1932 to 1933

1st Chamber of Deputies
←	Const.	2nd	→

Overview
- Legislative body: Chamber of Deputies
- Jurisdiction: Syria
- Meeting place: Chamber of Deputies Building, Damascus
- Term: 7 June 1932 – 25 November 1933
- Election: 1931–1932
- Government: H. al-Azm II
- Members: 68
- Speaker: Subhi Barakat (Independent)

Sessions
- 1st: 7 June 1932 – 25 November 1933

The First Chamber of Deputies (Arabic: مجلس النواب للدور الاشتراعي الأول, romanized: Majlis al-Nuwwāb lil-dawr al-ishtirāʻī al-awwal) was the first parliament of the Syrian Republic. Composed following the 1931–32 parliamentary election, it convened on 7 June 1932 and remained in session until it was dissolved by the High Commissioner on 25 November 1933. The chamber played a central role in the early constitutional and political life of the Syrian Republic, including the election of the country's first president.

== Background and election ==
Parliamentary elections were called by the French High Commissioner in November 1931 to implement the 1930 constitution. However, the electoral process was marked by significant French intervention, including pressure on voters and manipulation of results.

These practices led to widespread protests across Syrian cities, with demonstrators denouncing electoral fraud and, in some cases, destroying ballot boxes. As a result, elections were annulled in several electoral districts and re-held on 6 April 1932 under different conditions.

The final results produced a fragmented chamber. The National Bloc won only 17 seats, becoming a minority, while other blocs included independents aligned with Muhammad Ali al-Abid and groups associated with Subhi Barakat and Haqqi al-Azm.

== Bureau ==
Position	Name	Party	Tenure
Speaker	Subhi Barakat	Independent	7 June 1932 – 25 November 1933
Deputy Speaker	Muhammad Nuri al-Futayh	National Bloc	7 June 1932 – 25 November 1933
Deputy Speaker	Selim Janbart		7 June 1932 – 25 November 1933
Secretary	Latif Ghanima	National Bloc	7 June 1932 – 25 November 1933
Secretary	Muhammad Jurab		7 June 1932 – 25 November 1933
Overseer	Moses Derkaloustian		7 June 1932 – 25 November 1933
Overseer	Arif al-Jazzar		7 June 1932 – 25 November 1933
Overseer	Minanyazi Jalousi Zada		7 June 1932 – 25 November 1933

== Election of the President ==
Shortly after its first session, the Chamber proceeded to elect the President of the Syrian Republic. The main candidates included Subhi Barakat, Haqqi al-Azm, Muhammad Ali al-Abid, and Hashim al-Atassi.

Due to their minority position, members of the National Bloc were unable to secure the election of their preferred candidate, al-Atassi, who withdrew after the first round. They subsequently supported al-Abid as a compromise candidate to prevent the election of pro-French figures.

Muhammad Ali al-Abid was elected President on 11 June 1932, becoming the first President of the Syrian Republic.

== Major legislation and actions ==
- Law regarding the issuance of Syrian paper currency, adopted in August 1932.
- Law establishing of the gendarmerie, adopted in August 1932.
- The emergence and legalization of new political parties, including the Constitutional Liberal Party led by Subhi Barakat and the Coalition Party founded by Haqqi al-Azm.
- Parliamentary debate over the 1933 draft treaty of “cooperation and friendship” with France, proposed by the government of Haqqi al-Azm.

== Crisis and dissolution ==
In May 1933, the government negotiated a draft treaty with France. The treaty was highly controversial and faced strong opposition within the Chamber.

When the Chamber convened on 25 November 1933 under French military presence to debate the treaty, a majority of deputies, led by Jamil Mardam Bey, presented a signed document rejecting the treaty as unjust to Syrian rights.

This unexpected opposition created a political crisis and heightened tensions between the French authorities and the Syrian legislature. On 25 November 1933, the French High Commissioner Damien de Martel dissolved the Chamber of Deputies indefinitely.

== Aftermath ==
The dissolution of the Chamber sparked widespread protests against French rule, which were met with violent repression, including bombardments of Syrian cities, particularly Damascus.

These events contributed to escalating nationalist resistance and set the stage for further political developments leading to the 1936 Franco-Syrian Treaty.

== Legacy ==
The 1st Chamber of Deputies marked the beginning of parliamentary governance in modern Syria. Despite operating under the constraints of the French Mandate, it demonstrated the growing strength of nationalist politics and parliamentary opposition. Its role in electing the first president and resisting foreign-imposed agreements made it a significant milestone in Syria's constitutional history.
