= Al-Zawiya (Chamber of Deputies electoral district) =

Former electoral district of Syria's national legislature

- Former electoral district for the Chamber of Deputies

Former electoral district
- Created: 1947
- Abolished: 1963
- Seats: 1 (1947–1963)
- Created from: Izraa
- Replaced by: Quneitra

Al-Zawiya (Arabic: الزوية) was an electoral district used to elect members of the Syrian Chamber of Deputies between 1947 and 1963. It was conterminous with the modern district of Fiq.

== Electoral system ==
In 1947, amid public protests and calls for a more representative system, Syria replaced the 1928 electoral system of indirect elections with a direct electoral system. The number of seats was set before every election and based on the proportional population size of each electoral district. The system was amended in 1949 to lower the voting age to 18 and women were given the right to vote.

== Deputies ==
Elections	Deputy (Party)
1947	Ahmad al-Hussein (N/A)
1949	Muhammad Youssef Abu Rumiyyah (N/A)
1953	Part of Daraa and al-Zawiya
1954 (Mar) (Note: The parliament elected in 1949 was restored in March 1954 after the regime of Adib Shishakli was overthrown. Deputies resumed their seats until the end of the term in July.)	Muhammad Youssef Abu Rumiyyah (N/A)
1954 (Oct)	Ahmad al-Hussein al-Muhammad (N/A)
1955 by-election	Ahmad al-Hussein al-Muhammad (N/A)
1961	Khalid al-Sarhani (Independent)
