= Al-Malikiyah (Chamber of Deputies electoral district) =

Former electoral district of Syria's national legislature

- Former electoral district for the Chamber of Deputies

Former electoral district
- Created: 1943
- Abolished: 1963
- Seats: 1 (1943–1963)
- Created from: Jazira
- Replaced by: Al-Hasakah

Al-Malikiyah (Arabic: المالكية), also known as Derik (Arabic: ديريك), was an electoral district used to elect members of the Syrian Chamber of Deputies between 1943 and 1963. The electoral district was first established as Tigris (Arabic: الدجلة) in 1943. It was renamed al-Malikiyah in 1961.

== Electoral system ==
Under the 1928 electoral system, Syria adopted its first formal electoral law after the Ottoman period and under the French Mandate. Promulgated by arrêté No. 1889 of High Commissioner Ponsot, the system created a two-tier indirect electoral system. Male citizens over the age of 21 would elect secondary electors, at a ratio of one elector per hundred first-tier voters, who would then elect members of parliament. The number of seats was determined before every election based on the proportional population size of each electoral district, with seats allocated across religious communities according to their numerical share. The system was criticised for entrenching the influence of local notables, elites, and landowners, with limited direct popular participation.

In 1947, the government of Jamil Mardam Bey introduced a new direct electoral system. The system was applied for the first time in the 1947 elections and was amended twice, in 1954 and 1961. It remained in force through the 1961 elections and until the fall of the Second Republic in 1963.

Until 1949, the electorate consisted of Syrian men aged 20 and over. Following Husni al-Za'im's seizure of power, the voting age was lowered to 18 and women were granted the right to vote. The subsequent Hashim al-Atassi government retained the lower voting age but restricted women's suffrage to literate women only, without the right to stand for election. It was not until the 1954 elections, held under the 1950 constitution, that women of all educational backgrounds were granted equal rights to vote and stand for office.

== Deputies ==
Elections	Deputy (Party)
1943	Abd al-Karim Mulla Sadiq (N/A)
1947	Abd al-Karim Mulla Sadiq (N/A)
1949	Fattah Mulla Sadiq (N/A)
1953	Part of Qamishli and Derik
1954 (Mar) (Note: The parliament elected in 1949 was restored in March 1954 after the regime of Adib Shishakli was overthrown. Deputies resumed their seats until the end of the term in July.)	Fattah Mulla Sadiq (N/A)
1954 (Oct)	Uwaynan al-Madlul (N/A)
1955 by-election	Uwaynan al-Madlul (N/A)
1961	Dahhan Nayef Mustafa Pasha (Independent)
