= Bedouin tribal representation in the Syrian Chamber of Deputies =

Former electoral district of Syria's national legislature

Bedouin tribal electoral districts in Syria were special electoral districts established to represent Bedouin tribes in the Syrian Chamber of Deputies. These electoral districts reflect the nomadic or semi-nomadic lifestyle and distinct social and tribal structures of Bedouin communities, which often differ from standard territorial divisions.

== Electoral system ==
In 1928, Syria’s electoral system included formal provisions to represent Bedouin tribes. While the wider system was indirect and mediated through secondary and primary electors, tribal chiefs elected representatives to seats allocated to nomadic Bedouin communities. This was part of an effort to include mobile, rural groups otherwise left out of rigid district-based voting, and it required political negotiation between tribal leaders and state authorities.

When the 1947 electoral system replaced the old law, it retained special arrangements for Bedouin representation but within a direct electoral framework tied to administrative regions and electoral districts. Bedouin seats were still recognised as distinct electoral districts, though in practice tribal leaders often influenced candidate selection and support due to communal decision-making norms. The structure thus blended modern electoral principles with traditional leadership patterns in Bedouin society, maintaining their presence within Syria’s evolving representative institutions.

== Deputies ==
=== 1928 ===
The following deputies were elected to the Constituent Assembly in the 1928 election:

Deputy	Tribe
Nuri al-Shaalan	Tribes of the Syrian Desert
Nawwaf al-Salih	Tribes of Aleppo

=== 1931–32 ===
The following deputies were elected to the 1st Chamber of Deputies in the 1931–32 election:

Deputy	Tribe
Nuri al-Shaalan	Tribes of Damascus
Nawwaf al-Salih	Tribes of the Aleppo Desert
Mayzar Abd al-Muhsin	Shammar

=== 1936 ===
The following deputies were elected to the 2nd Chamber of Deputies in the 1936 election:

Deputy	Tribe
Fawaz al-Shaalan	Damascus desert
Tarrad al-Melhem	Damascus desert
Rakan bin Murshid	Damascus desert
Nawwaf al-Salih	Tribes of Aleppo
Shayesh bin Abdul-Karim	Tribes of Aleppo
Mujhim bin Muheid	Jazira and Euphrates tribes
Dahham al-Hadi	Jazira and Euphrates tribes
N/A	Jabal al-Druze tribes (in 1937)

=== 1943 ===
The following deputies were elected to the 3rd Chamber of Deputies in the 1943 election:

Deputy	Tribe
Fawaz al-Shaalan	Damascus desert
Tarrad al-Milhim	Damascus desert
Tamer al-Milhim (Note: Tamer al-Milhim was elected in the 1946 by-election, following the death of Tarrad al-Milhim)	Damascus desert
Nawwaf al-Salih	Aleppo Desert
Shaish Abd al-Karim	Aleppo Desert
Rakan al-Murshid	Tadmur desert
Mujhim bin Muheid	Deir ez-Zor desert
Abd al-Aziz Kumayshish	Deir ez-Zor desert
Dahham al-Hadi	Jazira desert
Mayzar Abd al-Muhsin	Jazira desert

=== 1947 ===
The following deputies were elected to the 4th Chamber of Deputies in the 1947 election:

Deputy	Tribe
Fawaz al-Shaalan	Syrian Desert
Tamer al-Milhim	Syrian Desert
Hayil al-Surur	Jabal al-Druze Tribes
Rakan al-Murshid	Tadmur desert
Nawwaf al-Salih	Aleppo – al-Hadidiyin
Faisal Nawwaf al-Salih (Note: Faisal Nawwaf al-Salih was elected in the 1949 by-election, following the death of Nawwaf al-Salih)	Aleppo – al-Hadidiyin
Abd al-Ibrahim	Aleppo – al-Mawali
Mujhim bin Muheid	Deir ez-Zor desert
Abd al-Aziz Kuayshish	Deir ez-Zor desert
Munir Abd al-Muhsin	Jazira
Dahham al-Hadi	Jazira

=== 1949 ===
The following deputies were elected to the Constituent Assembly and 5th Chamber of Deputies in the 1949 election:

Deputy	Tribe
Faisal al-Nawwaf al-Salih	Aleppo desert for al-Hadidiyin
Abd al-Ibrahim	Aleppo desert for al-Mawali
Dahham al-Hadi	Jazira desert for Shammar al-Kharsa
Mayzar Abd al-Muhsin	Jazira desert for Shammar al-Zour
Nuri bin Miheid	Deir ez-Zor Desert
Nayef al-Shaalan	Syrian Desert
Tamer al-Milhim	Syrian Desert
Hayil al-Surur	Jabal al-Druze Desert
Rakan al-Murshid	Palmyra, Homs and Hama desert

=== 1953 ===
The following deputies were elected to the 6th Chamber of Deputies (1953–1954) in the 1953 election:

Deputy	Tribe
Nayef al-Shaalan	Tribes of Damascus Governorate
Rakan al-Murshid	Tribes of Homs Governorate
Nuri bin Miheid	Tribes of Deir ez-Zor Governorate
Dahham al-Hadi	Tribes of al-Hasakah Governorate

=== 1954 ===
The following deputies were elected to the 6th Chamber of Deputies (1954–1958) in the 1954 election:

Deputy	Tribe
Abd al-Ibrahim	Tribes of the Aleppo Desert - Al-Mawali
Faisal al-Nawwaf	Tribes of the Aleppo Desert - Al-Hadidiyin
Dahham al-Hadi	Jazira Bedouin Tribes - Shammar Al-Kharsa
Humaydi al-Abd al-Karim	Jazira Bedouin Tribes - Shammar al-Zour
Nuri bin Miheid	Deir ez-Zor desert tribes
Mut'ib al-Shaalan	Tribes of the Syrian desert and al-Hasna
Tamer al-Mulhim	Tribes of the Syrian desert and al-Hasna
Hayil al-Surur	Tribes of Jabal al-Druze desert
Dahham al-Hadi (Note: Dahham al-Hadi was elected in the 1957 by-election.) (Ba'ath Party)	Tribes of Jabal al-Druze desert
Rakan al-Murshid	Tadmur Bedouin Tribes - Homs and Hama

=== 1961 ===
The following deputies were elected to the Constituent and Parliamentary Assembly in the 1961 election:

Deputy (Party)	Tribe
Dahham al-Hadi (Independent)	Shammar Al-Kharsa tribes
Munir Abd al-Muhsin (Independent)	Shammar al-Zour tribes
Mut'ib al-Shaalan (Independent)	The tribes of the Syrian desert and al-Hasna
Tamer al-Mulhim (Independent)	Tadmur Bedouin Tribes
Tarrad Rakan al-Murshid (Independent)	Homs and Hama desert
Abd al-Ibrahim al-Ibrahim (Independent)	Al-Mawali tribes
Faisal Nawwaf al-Salih (Independent)	Al-Mawali tribes
