= Hama University =

Public university in Hama, Syria

Coordinates: 35°07′50.9″N 36°45′18.4″E

- جامعة حماة
- Former name: part of Homs University
- Type: Public
- Established: May 13, 2014
- President: Abdulrazzak Salem
- Students: 25 000 (2017)
- Location: Hama, Hama Governorate, Syria
- Language: Arabic
- Colours: Green Brown
- Website: hama-univ.edu.sy
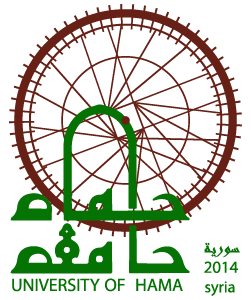

Hama University (Arabic: جامعة حماة, ALA-LC: Jāmiʻat Ḥamāh) is a public university located in the city of Hama, Syria. It was established in 2014.

== History ==
It was established in 2014 by Presidential Decree No. 19.

== Structure ==
=== Faculties ===
- Veterinary Medicine: Founded in 1969 (as part of Aleppo university then part of Al-Baath University (today Homs University) in 1979 and then part of Hama university in 2014).
- Dentistry: Founded in 1979.
- Economics: Founded in 2005.
- Physical Education: Founded in 2005.
- Arts and Humanities: Founded in 2006.
- Education: Founded in 2006.
- Nursing: Founded in 2008.
- Agriculture: Founded in 2011.
- Medicine: Founded in 2012.
- Architecture: Founded in 2013.
- Applied Science: Founded in 2013.
- Pharmacy: Founded in 2014.
- Science: Founded in 2014.
- Civil Engineering: Founded in 2016.
- Mechanical and Electrical Engineering: Founded in 2021.

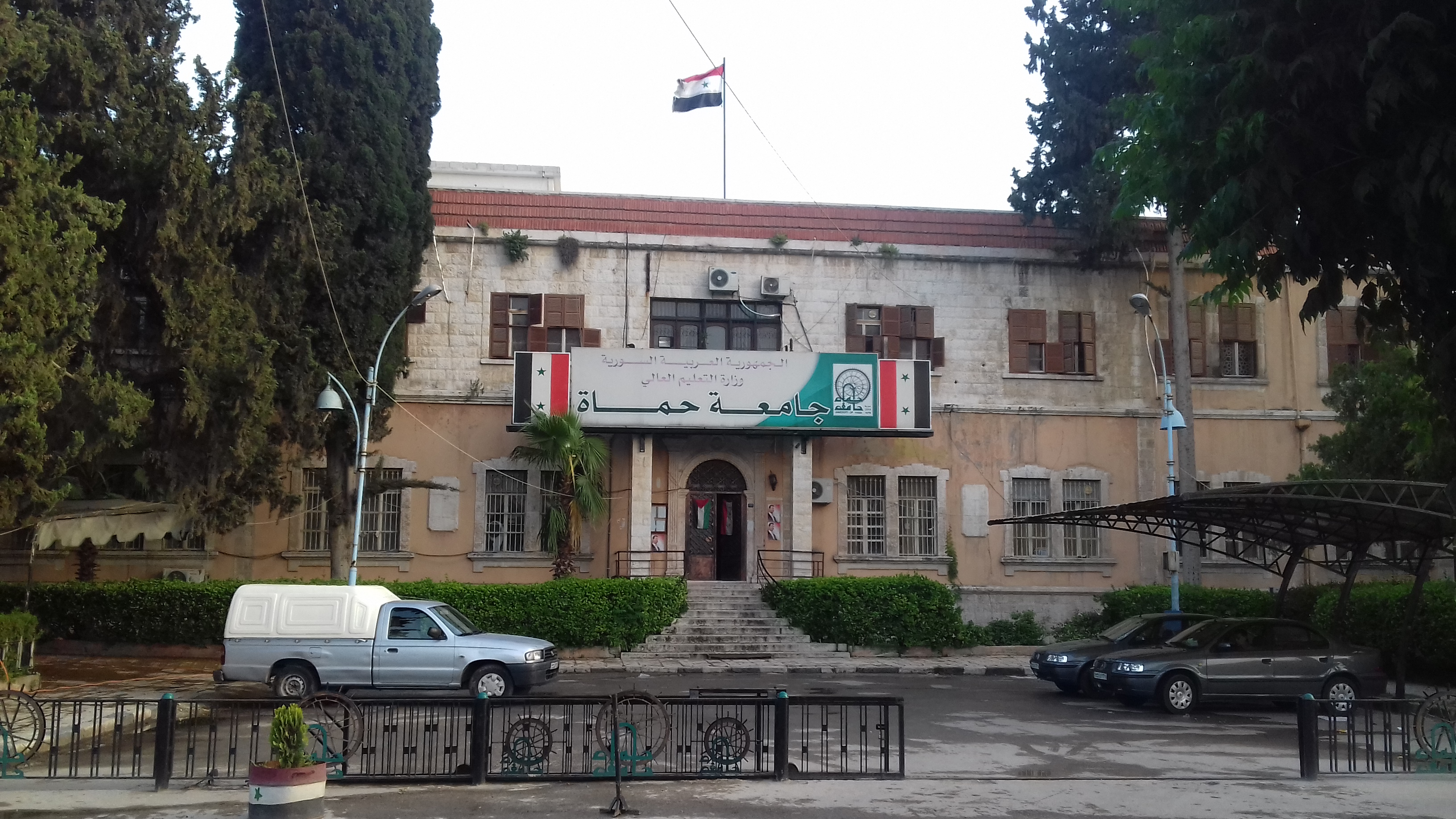
First Headquarters of the university (former building of Hama City Council)

=== Institutes ===
- Higher Institute of Languages.
- Technical Institute of Dentistry.
- Technical Institute of Emergency Medical Services.
- Technical Institute of Computer.
- Technical Institute of Agricultural studies.
- Technical Institute of Veterinary Medicine.

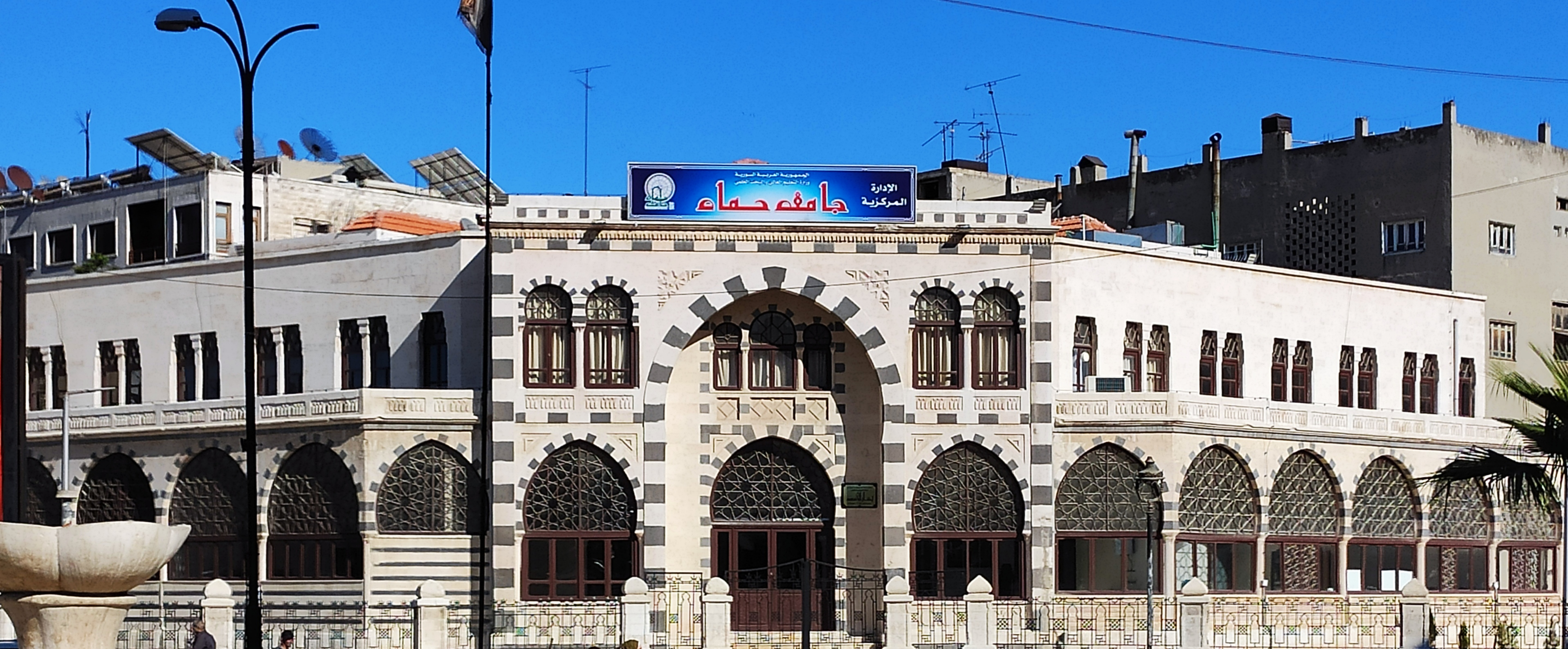
Hama University Headquarters

== University Hospital ==
Currently there is one university hospital being built in campus (nowadays medical students are being trained in Hama National Hospital and Assad Women and Children's Hospital, which are directed by Ministry of Health).

== Presidents ==
1. Azzam Riyad al-Kurdi
2. Mohamed Ziad Mamdouh Sultan
3. Abdulrazzak Salem
4. Abdul Karim Qalb Al-Lawz

== Logo ==
The emblem of Hama University represents the iconic ancient Norias of Hama city in brown color along with the decorated university name in green.
