= Izraa (Chamber of Deputies electoral district) =

Former electoral district of Syria's national legislature

- Former electoral district for the Chamber of Deputies

Former electoral district
- Created: 1931
- Abolished: 1963
- Seats: List: 3 (1943–1947; 1961–1963); 2 (1931–1943; 1947–1949; 1954–1958); 1 (1949–1954)
- Created from: Hauran
- Replaced by: Daraa

Izraa (Arabic: إزرع) was an electoral district used to elect members of the Syrian Chamber of Deputies between 1931 and 1963. The electoral district was first established as Izraa-Zawiya in 1931 for the first elections to the newly-established Chamber of Deputies. It was renamed Izraa in 1936. In 1947, the consistuency of al-Zawiya was created from Izraa.

== Electoral system ==
Under the 1928 electoral system, Syria adopted its first formal electoral law after the Ottoman period and under the French Mandate. Promulgated by arrêté No. 1889 of High Commissioner Ponsot, the system created a two-tier indirect electoral system. Male citizens over the age of 21 would elect secondary electors, at a ratio of one elector per hundred first-tier voters, who would then elect members of parliament. The number of seats was determined before every election based on the proportional population size of each electoral district, with seats allocated across religious communities according to their numerical share. The system was criticised for entrenching the influence of local notables, elites, and landowners, with limited direct popular participation.

In 1947, the government of Jamil Mardam Bey introduced a new direct electoral system. The system was applied for the first time in the 1947 elections and was amended twice, in 1954 and 1961. It remained in force through the 1961 elections and until the fall of the Second Republic in 1963.

Until 1949, the electorate consisted of Syrian men aged 20 and over. Following Husni al-Za'im's seizure of power, the voting age was lowered to 18 and women were granted the right to vote. The subsequent Hashim al-Atassi government retained the lower voting age but restricted women's suffrage to literate women only, without the right to stand for election. It was not until the 1954 elections, held under the 1950 constitution, that women of all educational backgrounds were granted equal rights to vote and stand for office.

== Deputies ==
Elections	Deputy (Party)	Deputy (Party)	Deputy (Party)
1931–32	Ismail al-Hariri (N/A)	Faris al-Zoubi (N/A)	2 seats
1936	Ismail al-Hariri (N/A)	Faris al-Zoubi (N/A)	2 seats
1943	Muhammad Khayr al-Hariri (Until 1947: National Bloc; From 1948: National Party)	Ahmad Faris al-Zoubi (N/A)	Ahmad al-Hussein (N/A)
1947	Muhammad Khayr al-Hariri (Until 1947: National Bloc; From 1948: National Party)	Muhammad Youssef Abu Rumiyyah (N/A)	2 seats
1949	Muhammad Khayr al-Hariri (Until 1947: National Bloc; From 1948: National Party)	1 seats	
1953	Yasin Muhammad al-Hariri (N/A)	1 seats	
1954 (Mar) (Note: The parliament elected in 1949 was restored in March 1954 after the regime of Adib Shishakli was overthrown. Deputies resumed their seats until the end of the term in July.)	Muhammad Khayr al-Hariri (National Party)	1 seats	
1954 (Oct)	Muhammad Khayr al-Hariri (National Party)	Muhammad Youssef Abu Rumiyya (N/A)	2 seats
1955 by-election	Muhammad Khayr al-Hariri (National Party)	Muhammad Youssef Abu Rumiyya (N/A)	2 seats
1961	Muhammad Khayr al-Hariri (National Party)	Ahmad Abdul-Karim (Independent)	Abd al-Hamid al-Khalil (ALM)
