= 1931–32 Syrian parliamentary election =

- 20 December 1931 (first stage); 5 January 1932 (second stage) (Note: Deferred elections in some electoral districts were held on 6 April 1932)

All 68 seats in the Chamber of Deputies 35 seats needed for a majority
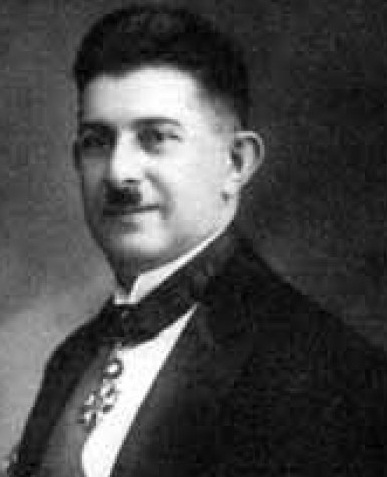

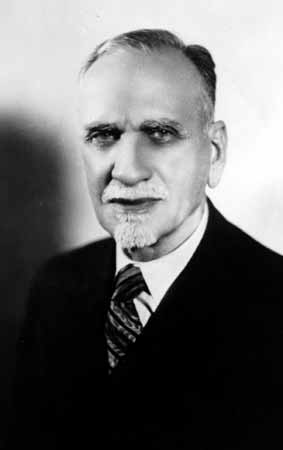
	First party	Second party
Leader	Subhi Barakat	Hashim al-Atassi
Party	Pro-French independents	National Bloc
Seats won	28	17
Prime Minister before election
Léon Solomiac (acting)
Elected Prime Minister
Haqqi al-Azm
Independent

Parliamentary elections were held in Syria in December 1931 and January 1932, the first held under the Constitution of 1930. The elections were held in two stages; the first stage was held on 20 December 1931, and the second on 5 January 1932, with the first stage in Damascus postponed until 6 April 1932, owing to widespread fraud and violence. The elections resulted in 68 deputies being seated, of whom 17 belonged to the National Bloc. The newly elected parliament convened on 7 June 1932, elected Subhi Barakat as President of the Chamber of Deputies, and on 11 June 1932 elected Mohammad Ali al-Abid as the first President of the Syrian Republic.

== Background ==
In 1928, the mandatory authorities had called elections for a constituent assembly charged with drafting Syria's first republican constitution. The National Bloc won a majority of seats, and Hashim al-Atassi was elected president of the assembly. However, France suspended the assembly after al-Atassi and his colleagues refused the demand of High Commissioner Henri Ponsot to amend six articles and insert Article 116, which would formally recognise the legitimacy of the Mandate as established in 1920. Ponsot subsequently promulgated the constitution unilaterally in May 1930, incorporating the disputed amendments and adding Article 116, without consulting either the National Bloc or the Constituent Assembly.

Public anger against France mounted sharply in the following years. A strike broke out in Hama on 19 June 1930, followed by the closure of markets in Aleppo in July in protest at public-sector wages. By 20 September 1930, strikes had spread to Homs, prompting Ponsot to consider offering political concessions. He proposed to the French Foreign Ministry that parliamentary elections be held in October 1930, but his proposal was rejected. Popular demonstrations across Syrian cities continued and reached their peak on Martyrs' Day, 6 May 1931.

Following this escalation, Ponsot travelled to Paris to persuade the French government of the need to address the situation. On 20 November 1931, he dismissed Prime Minister Taj al-Din al-Hasani in a bid to placate the National Bloc, and formed an advisory council tasked with implementing the constitution and organising the forthcoming parliamentary elections, scheduled for 20 December 1931 and 4 January 1932. Hashim al-Atassi was appointed a member of this council, and Badi' Muayyad al-Azm was named acting head of government, entrusted with overseeing the elections.

The National Bloc held an open conference from 25 November to 2 December 1931, at the conclusion of which it resolved to participate in the elections. Al-Atassi issued a national statement explaining the decision:

Despite the silence surrounding the nation's demands, despite the fact that a large number of Syrians remain in exile and are not permitted to return to their homeland, despite the obvious flaws in the electoral law and its inability to safeguard the rights of the people, our national duty calls us not to be absent from this struggle at this critical juncture through which our country is passing.

Al-Atassi also demanded that the French authorities issue a general amnesty for political exiles to enable them to participate, but this demand was flatly rejected by Paris.

The elections coincided with a broader debate about Syria's future form of government. The 1930 constitution had established a republic, but the unifying tendency of Syrian nationalists and the difficulty of reaching agreement with nationalist leaders led High Commissioner Ponsot to contemplate converting Syria into a monarchy. He considered that France might appoint a king who could reach an understanding with the country's leaders. Candidates discussed included the former Syrian and then reigning Iraqi king Faisal I, his brother Prince Ali, the former Khedive of Egypt Abbas Hilmi II, and Ahmad Nami.

The royalist cause was led by Rida Pasha al-Rikabi, who had returned to Syria in 1924 and had served twice as prime minister under King Faisal and once as head of government in Transjordan. Despite residual enthusiasm for the Hashemites among some religious circles and those who remembered the first Arab government in Damascus, the emerging Syrian political elite — whose leaders had won public trust through political and military resistance to France — was not prepared to yield its authority to a monarchy. The dominant preference was for a national leader from their own ranks. The elections ultimately proved unfavourable to the royalists; even their leader al-Rikabi failed to win a seat.

== Electoral system ==
Deputies were elected according to the procedures established in 1928. The first stage of elections was set for 20 December 1931 and the second stage for 5 January 1932. Several political movements participated, including the National Bloc under Hashim al-Atassi, the Royalist Party under Rida al-Rikabi, and supporters of the Mandate who rallied behind Taj al-Din al-Hasani and the pro-French Reform Party led by Haqqi al-Azm.

== Electoral lists ==
Four principal lists competed in Damascus:

- The list of former Prime Minister Taj al-Din al-Hasani.
- The list of Haqqi al-Azm, former governor of the State of Damascus.
- The list of the Royalist People's Party under former Prime Minister Rida Pasha al-Rikabi.
- The list of the National Bloc under Hashim al-Atassi.

Competition in Aleppo was confined to two lists:

- The list of former head of state Subhi Barakat.
- The list of the National Bloc under Ibrahim Hananu.

== Conduct ==
In Damascus, Taj al-Din al-Hasani benefited from the substantial support of the city's mayor, Wathiq Muayyad al-Azm, and the chief of police, Bahij al-Khatib. On the first day of voting, members of the National Bloc entered the polling station in the Qanawat district of Damascus and found police officers coercing voters into casting ballots for al-Hasani and his allies. When the lawyer Zaki al-Khatib insisted on monitoring the process, he was forcibly ejected from the polling centre.

The following day, Damascus called a general strike in protest at the fraud, and a large demonstration emerged from the Umayyad Mosque calling for a boycott of the elections; five demonstrators supporting the National Bloc were killed. On 21 December, al-Atassi met the High Commissioner and demanded the annulment of the first day's results. Ponsot replied that a partial annulment was not possible — the elections must either be cancelled entirely or proceed according to proper procedure — but he agreed to allow National Bloc members to enter polling centres in Aleppo as observers. Ponsot subsequently agreed to postpone the Damascus elections to 6 April 1932, whilst keeping the Aleppo elections on their original date. At the National Bloc's insistence, the agreement also provided for the release of nationalist leaders detained by the mandatory forces, such as Saadallah al-Jabiri in Aleppo, and the return of exiles such as Shukri al-Quwatli. It did not, however, cover the two principal leaders of the Great Syrian Revolt, Abd al-Rahman Shahbandar and Sultan al-Atrash, whose return the High Commissioner had opposed since 1926.

In Aleppo, a similarly coercive atmosphere prevailed. The journalist Nusuh Babil later described the scene in his memoirs:

The elections were held in an atmosphere of vile black terror. Senegalese soldiers filled the electoral districts, brandishing their bayonets, fully prepared to open fire on anyone who made a hostile movement before the ballot boxes. Under this climate of terror, the list of Subhi Barakat — who had collaborated with the French authorities up to that point — won, and Ibrahim Hananu, the unrivalled leader of the people, did not succeed.

== Results ==
In Aleppo, the climate of violence and intimidation led to the defeat of prominent National Bloc figures, including Ibrahim Hananu, Saadallah al-Jabiri, and Abd al-Rahman al-Kayyali, considerably diminishing the Bloc's weight in the new parliament. Only one Bloc candidate succeeded in Aleppo: Nazim al-Qudsi, with 280 votes, whilst al-Katyali, for instance, received only 196 votes. Subhi Barakat received the highest vote share (310 votes) and his parliamentary bloc reached 28 deputies against the National Bloc's 17.

In the other cities, the Atassi list won in full in Homs, the list of Najib al-Barazi won in Hama, and the list of Jamil Mardam Bey won in Damascus. Taj al-Din al-Hasani was defeated in spite of the support afforded to him, and subsequently travelled to France to lodge a formal complaint.
