= List of members of the Constituent and Parliamentary Assembly, 1961–1962, and Chamber of Deputies (Syria), 1962–1963 =

This is a list of deputies elected to the Constituent and Parliamentary Assembly, following the 1961 parliamentary election. The election was held on 1 and 2 December 1961. There are no available official records, but the number of eligible voters was estimated at between 1,000,000 and 1,250,000. More than 1,800 candidates, among them 11 women, contested for the 172-seat constitutional assembly. Participation in the various constituencies varied between 48—84%, "a figure not reached in Syria before."

The Constituent and Parliamentary Assembly was tasked with adopting a new constitution after secession from the United Arab Republic. The new constitution was adopted on September 13, 1962, and the Parliament continued to exercise its legislative duties until its dissolution after the Ba'ath coup in 1963. This legislature is the eighth in Syria's republican history.

== Composition ==
Party	Members
People's Party	35 / 172 (20%)
National Party	20 / 172 (12%)
Ba'ath Party	19 / 172 (11%)
Muslim Brotherhood	9 / 172 (5%)
Arab Liberation Movement	5 / 172 (3%)
Independent	84 / 172 (49%)

== Deputies ==
No.	Electoral district	Name	Party
1	Damascus	Khalid al-Azm	Independent
2	Damascus	Maamun al-Kuzbari	Independent
3	Damascus	Issam al-Attar	Muslim Brotherhood
4	Damascus	Muhammad Abdin	Independent
5	Damascus	Sabri al-Asali	National Party
6	Damascus	Hussein Khattab	Muslim Brotherhood
7	Damascus	Said al-Ghazzi	Independent
8	Damascus	Rashad Jabri	People's Party
9	Damascus	Fouad al-Adil	Independent
10	Damascus	Adnan al-Quwatli	National Party
11	Damascus	Rashid ad-Duqr	Independent
12	Damascus	Omar Awda al-Khatib	Muslim Brotherhood
13	Damascus	Zuhayr ash-Shawish	Muslim Brotherhood
14	Damascus	Bashir Ramadan	Independent
15	Damascus	Awad Barakat	Independent
16	Damascus	Suhail al-Khoury	National Party
17	Damascus	Hanin Sahnawi	Independent
18	The Ghoutas	Muhammad Said al-Abbar	Muslim Brotherhood
19	The Ghoutas	Abd al-Rauf Abu Tawq	Muslim Brotherhood
20	The Ghoutas	Muzhar ash-Shurbaji	National Party
21	Douma	Mahmoud al-Hakim	Ba'ath Party
22	Douma	Ahmad Ismail	Arab Liberation Movement
23	Douma	Muhammad Subhi Taha	Independent
24	Douma	Mahmoud al-Azm	National Party
25	Al-Nabek	Amin al-Nufuri	Independent
26	Al-Nabek	Ibrahim Tayfur	National Party
27	Al-Qutayfah	Mahmoud Muhammad Diyab	Independent
28	Al-Zabadani	Jamil al-Shammat	Independent
29	Quneitra	Faour al-Faour	Independent
30	Quneitra	Abd al-Razzaq al-Tahhan	Independent
31	Quneitra	Abd al-Rahman Ayyub	Independent
32	Qatana	Hussein Maryud	Ba'ath Party
33	Qatana	Adil al-Ajlani	National Party
34	Daraa	Ibrahim Rizq Abazayd	Independent
35	Daraa	Abd al-Latif al-Miqdad	Independent
36	Daraa	Muhammad al-Muflih al-Zoubi	Independent
37	Izraa	Ahmad Abdul-Karim	Independent
38	Izraa	Abd al-Hamid al-Khalil	Arab Liberation Movement
39	Izraa	Muhammad Khayr al-Hariri	National Party
40	Al-Zawiya	Khalid al-Sarhani	Independent
41	Suwayda	Hussein Murshid	Independent
42	Suwayda	Nayef Jarbu	Ba'ath Party
43	Salkhad	Mustafa al-Atrash	Independent
44	Shahba	Nawwaf Hasan Amir	Ba'ath Party
45	Homs	Ratib al-Husami	People's Party
46	Homs	Faydi al-Atassi	People's Party
47	Homs	Farhan al-Jandali	People's Party
48	Homs	Sami Tayyara	Arab Liberation Movement
49	Homs	Said al-Tilawi	National Party
50	Homs	Muhammad Ali Mashaal	People's Party
51	Homs	Tayyeb al-Khoja	Muslim Brotherhood
52	Homs	Hani al-Sibai	People's Party
53	Homs	Munib Raslan	Independent
54	Homs	Abdallah Farkuh	National Party
55	Homs	Musallam al-Haddad	People's Party
56	Jubb al-Jarrah	Ahmad Dahiyah	Independent
57	Tadmur	Munir Ahmad al-Fayyad	Independent
58	Talkalakh	Mansur Tawfiq al-Hasan	Independent
59	Talkalakh	Abd al-Karim Dabbah al-Dandashi	Arab Liberation Movement
60	Talkalakh	Khalil Georges Daass	Independent
61	Hama	Akram al-Hourani	Ba'ath Party
62	Hama	Mustafa Hamdun	Ba'ath Party
63	Hama	Abd al-Ghani Qannut	Ba'ath Party
64	Hama	Abd al-Aziz Uthman	Ba'ath Party
65	Hama	Muhammad Ali Adil	Ba'ath Party
66	Hama	Muhammad Aturah	Ba'ath Party
67	Hama	Khalil al-Kallas	Ba'ath Party
68	Salamiyah	Mustafa Mirza	Independent
69	Salamiyah	Mustafa Tamer	Independent
70	Saan al-Sain	Muhammad bin Abd al-Karim Dayyub Nasir	Independent
71	Masyaf	Qahtan al-Hawwash	Ba'ath Party
72	Masyaf	Muhammad Suleiman Ali Maaruf	Ba'ath Party
73	Masyaf	Abd al-Hadi Ahmad	Ba'ath Party
74	Al-Hasakah	Muhammad Rashid al-Zubaa	Independent
75	Al-Hasakah	Khalil Ibrahim Pasha	Independent
76	Al-Hasakah	Kaud al-Tallaa	Independent
77	Al-Hasakah	Ziya Malak Ismail	Independent
78	Al-Shaddadi	Suleiman Ali al-Asaad	Independent
79	Qamishli	Abd al-Razzaq al-Hasu	Independent
80	Qamishli	Abd al-Razzaq al-Nayef	Independent
81	Qamishli	Talaat Abd al-Qadir	Independent
82	Qamishli	Ilyas Najjar	Independent
83	Al-Malikiyah	Dahhan Nayef Mustafa Pasha	Independent
84	Deir ez-Zor	Abd al-Samad al-Futtayih	Independent
85	Deir ez-Zor	Raghib al-Bashir	Independent
86	Deir ez-Zor	Jalal al-Sayyed	Independent
87	Deir ez-Zor	Abd al-Rahman al-Hunaydi	Arab Liberation Movement
88	Deir ez-Zor	Abd al-Karim al-Fayyad	Independent
89	Mayadin	Abboud al-Jadaan	Independent
90	Mayadin	Ahmad Shashan	Independent
91	Abu Kamal	Dahham al-Dandal	Independent
92	Abu Kamal	Fahd al-Dandal	Independent
93	Raqqa	Faisal al-Huwaydi	Independent
94	Raqqa	Hamid al-Khoja	Independent
95	Raqqa	Mustafa al-Kaakaji	Independent
96	Tell Abyad	Khalaf al-Hassan	Independent
97	Ayn Issa	Mujhim bin Miheid	Independent
98	Aleppo	Maarouf al-Dawalibi	People's Party
99	Aleppo	Rashad Barmada	People's Party
100	Aleppo	Alaa al-Din al-Jabiri	People's Party
101	Aleppo	Asaad al-Kurani	National Party
102	Aleppo	Abd al-Salam Kanaan	National Party
103	Aleppo	Abd al-Fattah Abu Ghudda	Muslim Brotherhood
104	Aleppo	Ahmad Qanbar	People's Party
105	Aleppo	Abd al-Khaliq Ibrahim	People's Party
106	Aleppo	Mustafa al-Zarqa	Independent
107	Aleppo	Bakri al-Qabbani	People's Party
108	Aleppo	Muhammad Talas	National Party
109	Aleppo	Aram Karamanoukian	Independent
110	Aleppo	Leon Zamarya	National Party
111	Aleppo	Naum al-Suyufi	National Party
112	Aleppo	Grigor Ablighatian	Independent
113	Aleppo	Joseph Jarmaq	Independent
114	Mount Simeon	Hussein Ali Shahin Awwad	People's Party
115	Mount Simeon	Hussein Abd al-Karim al-Dandal	People's Party
116	Mount Simeon	Izzat Ibrahim Pasha	People's Party
117	Mount Simeon	Ismail al-Hajj Barakat	People's Party
118	Mount Simeon	Ahmad Tawfiq Tahir	People's Party
119	Al-Bab	Tahir al-Hajj Fadil	Independent
120	Al-Bab	Abdallah Jassumah	People's Party
121	Al-Bab	Ahmad Ali Agha	Independent
122	Ayn al-Arab	Shahin Mustafa Shahin	Independent
123	Ayn al-Arab	Ismat Bozan Shahin	Independent
124	Manbij	Diab al-Mashi	People's Party
125	Manbij	Ibrahim Shalash Ibrahim	People's Party
126	Manbij	Hazim al-Labani	People's Party
127	Afrin	Muhammad Mannan Ismail Zadeh	People's Party
128	Afrin	Ahmad Jaafar Ismail Zadeh	People's Party
129	Afrin	Muhammad Nuri Arif	People's Party
130	Afrin	Muhammad Dahini Uthman	People's Party
131	Azaz	Ahmad Kannu	People's Party
132	Azaz	Nafi' Bakkar	People's Party
133	Azaz	Ali Hasan Junaydan	People's Party
134	Jarabulus	Ali Muhli Ibrahim	Independent
135	Idlib City	Muhammad Adib Asfari	People's Party
136	Idlib City	Abd al-Hamid Duwaydari	People's Party
137	Idlib District	Hasan Mustafa Hajj Hussein	People's Party
138	Idlib District	Khalid Ubaydin	People's Party
139	Idlib District	Muhammad Fahmi Ashuri	Ba'ath Party
140	Jisr ash-Shughur	Naasan Zaki al-Najjari	National Party
141	Jisr ash-Shughur	Najdat al-Najjari	National Party
142	Maarat al-Numan	Ahmad al-Youssefi	Ba'ath Party
143	Maarat al-Numan	Imad al-Din al-Hiraki	Independent
144	Harem	Al-Walid Abd al-Rahman	Ba'ath Party
145	Harem	Nazim al-Kayyali	National Party
146	Latakia City	Nabil al-Tawil	Muslim Brotherhood
147	Latakia City	Muhammad al-Shawwaf	People's Party
148	Latakia City	Adil Murqus	Independent
149	Latakia District	Wahib al-Ghanem	Ba'ath Party
150	Latakia District	Munir al-Hafiz	Independent
151	Al-Haffah	Muhammad Ali Kamil	Independent
152	Al-Haffah	Nadim Mustafa Ismail	Independent
153	Jableh	Muhammad Nazir Ali Adib	Independent
154	Bani Ali	Ahmad Shafiq al-Kanj	Independent
155	Bani Ali	Uthman Hasan Esber	People's Party
156	Bani Ali	Ahmad Ali Kamil	Independent
157	Baniyas	Mahmoud Habib	Independent
158	Baniyas	Muhammad al-Hasan	Ba'ath Party
159	Tartus	Badi' Ismail	Independent
160	Tartus	Riyad Abd al-Razzaq	National Party
161	Tartus	Muhyi al-Din Murhij	National Party
162	Safita	Munir al-Abbas	Independent
163	Safita	Muhammad Amin Raslan	Independent
164	Safita	Abd al-Latif al-Yunis	National Party
165	Safita	Rafiq Bashur	People's Party
166	Shammar Al-Kharsa tribes	Dahham al-Hadi	Independent
167	Shammar al-Zour tribes	Munir Abd al-Muhsin	Independent
168	The tribes of the Syrian desert and Al-Hasna	Mut'ib al-Shaalan	Independent
169	Tadmur Bedouin Tribes	Tamer al-Mulhim	Independent
170	Homs and Hama desert	Tarrad Rakan al-Murshid	Independent
171	Al-Mawali tribes	Abd al-Ibrahim al-Ibrahim	Independent
172	Al-Mawali tribes	Faisal Nawwaf al-Salih	Independent

== Bibliography ==
- Oron, Yitzhak, ed. (1967). Middle East Record Volume 2, 1961. Jerusalem: The Moshe Dayan Center.
