= Raqqa (former People's Assembly electoral district) =

Former electoral district of Syria's national legislature

- Former electoral district for the People's Assembly
- Location of Raqqa within Syria
- Governorate: Raqqa
- Population: 944,000 (2011)
- Area: 19,618 km^{2}

Former electoral district
- Created: 1973
- Abolished: 2025
- Seats: List: 8 (1990–2025); 6 (1977–1990); 5 (1973–1977)
- Created from: List: Ayn Issa; Raqqa; Tell Abyad
- Replaced by: List: Ath-Thawra; Raqqa; Tell Abyad

Raqqa (Arabic: الرقة) was an electoral district used to elect members of the Syrian People's Assembly between 1973 and 2025.

== Electoral system ==
The electoral system used to elect the People's Assembly was introduced in 1973 and remained in use until the assembly's dissolution in 2025. Each governorate formed a single, large electoral district, except for Aleppo Governorate, which was divided into two districts: the city of Aleppo and the rural districts of Aleppo Governorate. Within each district, seats were awarded on a block-vote basis, with the candidates receiving the largest number of votes taking all of the seats allocated to it, and the assembly was composed of representatives of two sectors, "workers and peasants" and "other sectors of the people", with the former guaranteed at least half of its seats nationally. The number of seats, and their distribution among districts, was left to the president of the republic to set by decree rather than being fixed in law; the total was raised from 186 to 195 in 1981 and from 195 to 250 in 1990, after which the distribution among the fifteen electoral districts was not changed.

All Syrian citizens aged 18 and over were entitled to vote, other than those under legal guardianship, those with a mental illness affecting their legal capacity, and those convicted of a felony or a "dishonourable" misdemeanour, while serving members of the armed forces and police were barred from voting and from standing as candidates; candidates were further required to be at least 25 years old and to have held Syrian nationality for at least five years, a period raised to ten under the 2011 and 2014 electoral laws. During the 2011 reform of the electoral law, the replacement of this system was discussed because of its weak representativeness, but the large-district, block-vote system was retained; the reform instead moved the administration of elections from the Ministry of Interior and provincial governors to an independent Supreme Judicial Committee for Elections, a structure carried over into a further law passed in 2014 that consolidated the rules for presidential, parliamentary and local-council elections into a single statute.

Beyond being considered unrepresentative — a majoritarian, large-district system of a kind rejected by most electoral systems worldwide — the system has also been criticised for the unevenness of its distribution of seats between governorates. Based on the number of registered voters at the 2012 election, the average was around 59,000 voters per seat nationally, but the ratio varied considerably: about 37,800 voters per seat in Damascus and 51,500 in Tartus, compared with 71,700 in Al-Hasakah and 69,500 in the rural districts of Aleppo Governorate, with no mechanism beyond a presidential decree governing the size of constituencies or the allocation of seats between them.

== Members ==
Elections	MPA (Party)	MPA (Party)	MPA (Party)	MPA (Party)	MPA (Party)	MPA (Party)	MPA (Party)	MPA (Party)
1973	Jasim al-Muhaymid al-Huwaydi (N/A)	Umar al-Hajj Abd (N/A)	Muhammad Salah al-Sukhni (N/A)	Khalid al-Hamud (N/A)	Hussein Hamid al-Ajili (N/A)	5 sesats		
1977	Ismail Ubaid (N/A)	Ibrahim al-Hunaidi (N/A)	Mustafa al-Ayed (N/A)	Abd al-Razzaq al-Othman (N/A)	Abd al-Razzaq al-Huwaidi (N/A)	Mustafa al-Abdallah al-Alawi (N/A)	6 sesats	
1981	Ismail Abd al-Ghani (N/A)	Jasim al-Mousa (N/A)	Mustafa al-Ayed (N/A)	Khalaf al-Darwish (N/A)	Abd al-Razzaq al-Huwaidi (N/A)	Ghazi al-Hussein (N/A)	6 sesats	
1986	Ismail Abd al-Ghani (N/A)	Mazlouh al-Ali (N/A)	Mustafa al-Ayed (N/A)	Najwa al-Ajeili (N/A)	Faisal Alwani (N/A)	Ali al-Ali (N/A)	6 sesats	
1990	Ismail Abd al-Ghani (N/A)	Abd al-Fattah al-Jumaa (N/A)	Mustafa al-Ayed (N/A)	Najwa al-Ajeili (N/A)	Muhammad Anwar al-Dibs (N/A)	Abd al-Razzaq al-Eid (N/A)	Zakariya al-Hassan (N/A)	Muhammad al-Qammash (N/A)
1994	Ismail Abd al-Ghani (N/A)	Ismail al-Ali (N/A)	Mustafa al-Ayed (N/A)	Najwa al-Ajeili (N/A)	Shaban al-Hamoud al-Khalaf (N/A)	Abd al-Razzaq al-Zaher (N/A)	Ibrahim al-Ajil (N/A)	Muhammad al-Huwaidi (Ind.)
1998	Ali al-Ibrahim (N/A)	Ismail al-Ali (N/A)	Mustafa al-Ayed (N/A)	Nadwa al-Salloum (N/A)	Shaban al-Hamoud al-Khalaf (N/A)	Muhammad Jamil al-Hajwan (N/A)	Muhammad Najib al-Mustafa (N/A)	Jasim al-Humaidan (N/A)
2003	Ali al-Ali al-Jasham (Ba'ath)	Khalil al-Moussa (N/A)	Muhammad al-Ayed al-Bari (N/A)	Nadwa al-Salloum (N/A)	Abdallah al-Hassan (N/A)	Khalaf al-Khalaf al-Allan (N/A)	Ismail al-Ubayd al-Abd al-Hajou (N/A)	Muhammad al-Huwaidi (Ind.)
2007	Ali al-Ali al-Jasham (Ba'ath)	Hind al-Tarif (Ba'ath)	Haitham Mashouh (Ba'ath)	Abd al-Mohsen al-Rakan (Ind.)	Aziz al-Faza (Ba'ath)	Khadr al-Sheikh al-Hussein (Ba'ath)	Ismail al-Moussa (SUP)	Muhammad al-Huwaidi (Ind.)
2012	Khader al-Saleh (Ba'ath)	Abdul Hakim al-Musa al-Arif (Ba'ath)	Maha al-Ajili (Ba'ath)	Khalil al-Kasha (Ind.)	Ahmed al-Humaidi (Ba'ath)	Abdul Aziz al-Essa (Ba'ath)	Imad Muhammad (Ind.)	Qasim al-Matar (Ind.)
2015 by-election	Khader al-Saleh (Ba'ath)	Abdul Hakim al-Musa al-Arif (Ba'ath)	Maha al-Ajili (Ba'ath)	Khalil al-Kasha (Ind.)	Ahmed al-Humaidi (Ba'ath)	Abdul Aziz al-Essa (Ba'ath)	Faisal Haji Omar (Ind.)	Qasim al-Matar (Ind.)
2016	Khaled al-Darwish (Ba'ath)	Mousa al-Ibrahim (Ba'ath)	Maha al-Ajili (Ba'ath)	Khalil al-Kasha (Ind.)	Ismail al-Hajjo (SCP-U)	Ahmad al-Mahmoud al-Darwish (Ba'ath)	Faisal Haji Omar (Ind.)	Abd al-Basit al-Alawi (Ba'ath)
2018 by-election	Khaled al-Darwish (Ba'ath)	Mousa al-Ibrahim (Ba'ath)	Maha al-Ajili (Ba'ath)	Khalil al-Kasha (Ind.)	Ismail al-Hajjo (SCP-U)	Ahmad al-Mahmoud al-Darwish (Ba'ath)	Muhammad al-Turki (Ind.)	Abd al-Basit al-Alawi (Ba'ath)
2020	Khaled al-Darwish (Ba'ath)	Fayez al-Abdallah (Ba'ath)	Maha al-Ajili (Ba'ath)	Bashar al-Makhsoor (Ind.)	Ismail al-Hajjo (SCP-U)	Nidal al-Alou (Ba'ath)	Muhammad al-Turki (Ind.)	Ahmad al-Humaidi (Ba'ath)
2024	Ahmad Anayzan Ahmad (Ba'ath)	Rasha al-Jureijib (Ba'ath)	Ghazwan al-Ali (Ba'ath)	Jamal al-Hussein (Ind.)	Muhammad al-Fadous (SCP-U)	Nidal al-Alou (Ba'ath)	Raed al-Hanidi (Ba'ath)	Ahmad al-Khalaf (Ind.)
