= Latakia (former People's Assembly electoral district) =

Former electoral district of Syria's national legislature

- Former electoral district for the People's Assembly
- Location of Latakia within Syria
- Governorate: Latakia
- Population: 1,008,000 (2011)
- Area: 2,297 km^{2}

Former electoral district
- Created: 1973
- Abolished: 2025
- Seats: List: 17 (1990–2025); 13 (1973–1990)
- Created from: List: Al-Haffah; Bani Ali; Jableh; Latakia; Latakia City
- Replaced by: List: Al-Haffah Jableh Latakia Qardaha

Latakia (Arabic: اللاذقية) was an electoral district used to elect members of the Syrian People's Assembly between 1973 and 2025.

== Electoral system ==
The electoral system used to elect the People's Assembly was introduced in 1973 and remained in use until the assembly's dissolution in 2025. Each governorate formed a single, large electoral district, except for Aleppo Governorate, which was divided into two districts: the city of Aleppo and the rural districts of Aleppo Governorate. Within each district, seats were awarded on a block-vote basis, with the candidates receiving the largest number of votes taking all of the seats allocated to it, and the assembly was composed of representatives of two sectors, "workers and peasants" and "other sectors of the people", with the former guaranteed at least half of its seats nationally. The number of seats, and their distribution among districts, was left to the president of the republic to set by decree rather than being fixed in law; the total was raised from 186 to 195 in 1981 and from 195 to 250 in 1990, after which the distribution among the fifteen electoral districts was not changed.

All Syrian citizens aged 18 and over were entitled to vote, other than those under legal guardianship, those with a mental illness affecting their legal capacity, and those convicted of a felony or a "dishonourable" misdemeanour, while serving members of the armed forces and police were barred from voting and from standing as candidates; candidates were further required to be at least 25 years old and to have held Syrian nationality for at least five years, a period raised to ten under the 2011 and 2014 electoral laws. During the 2011 reform of the electoral law, the replacement of this system was discussed because of its weak representativeness, but the large-district, block-vote system was retained; the reform instead moved the administration of elections from the Ministry of Interior and provincial governors to an independent Supreme Judicial Committee for Elections, a structure carried over into a further law passed in 2014 that consolidated the rules for presidential, parliamentary and local-council elections into a single statute.

Beyond being considered unrepresentative — a majoritarian, large-district system of a kind rejected by most electoral systems worldwide — the system has also been criticised for the unevenness of its distribution of seats between governorates. Based on the number of registered voters at the 2012 election, the average was around 59,000 voters per seat nationally, but the ratio varied considerably: about 37,800 voters per seat in Damascus and 51,500 in Tartus, compared with 71,700 in Al-Hasakah and 69,500 in the rural districts of Aleppo Governorate, with no mechanism beyond a presidential decree governing the size of constituencies or the allocation of seats between them.

== Members ==
| Elections | MPA (Party) | MPA (Party) | MPA (Party) | MPA (Party) | MPA (Party) | MPA (Party) | MPA (Party) | MPA (Party) | MPA (Party) | MPA (Party) | MPA (Party) | MPA (Party) | MPA (Party) | MPA (Party) | MPA (Party) | MPA (Party) | MPA (Party) |
|---|---|---|---|---|---|---|---|---|---|---|---|---|---|---|---|---|---|
| 1973 | Ahmad Adhima (N/A) | Jurji Khoury (N/A) | Abd al-Khalq Hajuz (N/A) | Abdullah Banshi (N/A) | Abd al-Karim Ammar (N/A) | Mahmoud Ajil (N/A) | Mahmoud Musa (N/A) | Ahmad Khaddur (N/A) | Jamil al-Assad (Ba'ath) | Salma Najib (N/A) | Ghazi Khadra (N/A) | Muhammad Naasan Deeb (N/A) | Muhammad Kahila (N/A) | 13 seats | | | |
| 1977 | Tawfiq Darwish (N/A) | Nasr Saqour (N/A) | Ahmad Madaniyya (N/A) | Muhammad Jaafar (N/A) | Hassan Abu Zaid (N/A) | Mahmoud Ajil (N/A) | Ahmad Darji (N/A) | Suleiman Saqr (N/A) | Jamil al-Assad (Ba'ath) | Faisal Summaq (N/A) | Ghazi Khadra (N/A) | Ahmad Abu Musa (N/A) | Abdallah Zaitoun (N/A) | 13 seats | | | |
| 1981 | Tawfiq Darwish (N/A) | Rafiq Darwish (N/A) | Farid Janauro (N/A) | Ibrahim al-Lawza (N/A) | Omar Ashour (N/A) | Mahmoud Ajil (N/A) | Ahmad Darji (N/A) | Tawfiq Ibrahim (N/A) | Jamil al-Assad (Ba'ath) | Adnan Khuzeim (N/A) | Ghazi Khadra (N/A) | Ahmad Abu Musa (N/A) | Wafaa Snain (N/A) | 13 seats | | | |
| 1984 by-election | Tawfiq Darwish (N/A) | Rafiq Darwish (N/A) | Farid Janauro (N/A) | Ibrahim al-Lawza (N/A) | Omar Ashour (N/A) | Mahmoud Ajil (N/A) | Mustafa Abd al-Halim (N/A) | Tawfiq Ibrahim (N/A) | Jamil al-Assad (Ba'ath) | Adnan Khuzeim (N/A) | Ghazi Khadra (N/A) | Ahmad Abu Musa (N/A) | Wafaa Snain (N/A) | 13 seats | | | |
| 1986 | Tawfiq Darwish (N/A) | Rafiq Darwish (N/A) | Farid Janauro (N/A) | Ibrahim al-Lawza (N/A) | Karim al-Shaibani (N/A) | Mahmoud Ajil (N/A) | Mustafa Abd al-Halim (N/A) | Tawfiq Ibrahim (N/A) | Jamil al-Assad (Ba'ath) | Adnan Khuzeim (N/A) | Muhammad Saad (N/A) | Ahmad Abu Musa (N/A) | Wafaa Snain (N/A) | 13 seats | | | |
| 1990 | Tawfiq Darwish (N/A) | Rafiq Darwish (N/A) | Suhail Kanaan (N/A) | Ibrahim al-Lawza (N/A) | Layla Ghalawenji (N/A) | Mahmoud Ajil (N/A) | Mustafa Abd al-Halim (N/A) | Tawfiq Ibrahim (N/A) | Jamil al-Assad (Ba'ath) | Adnan Khuzeim (N/A) | Muhammad Saad (N/A) | Ahmad Abu Musa (N/A) | Bahjat Saad (N/A) | Sari Haddad (N/A) | Basil Youssef (N/A) | Muhammad Ali Nasser (N/A) | Fayez Othman (N/A) |
| 1994 | Tawfiq Darwish (N/A) | Rafiq Darwish (N/A) | Suhail Kanaan (N/A) | Ibrahim al-Lawza (N/A) | Haifa Saqr (N/A) | Jamila Shreiki (N/A) | Abd al-Karim Badawi (N/A) | Fuad Mathbout (N/A) | Jamil al-Assad (Ba'ath) | Anan Shabou (N/A) | Muhammad Saad (N/A) | Ahmad Abu Musa (N/A) | Bahjat Saad (N/A) | Suhail Shahadeh (N/A) | Fuad Zoubari (N/A) | Omar Hazim (N/A) | Fayez Othman (N/A) |
| 1998 | Nawfal Nawfal (ASUP) | Rafiq Darwish (N/A) | Fares Iskandar (N/A) | Ibrahim al-Lawza (N/A) | Haifa Saqr (N/A) | Youssef Hassan (N/A) | Farouk Shamout (N/A) | Muhammad Fakhri al-Sayyid (N/A) | Jamil al-Assad (Ba'ath) | Nizar Ismail (N/A) | Muhammad Saad (N/A) | Ahmad Abu Musa (N/A) | Al-Mundhir Maarouf (N/A) | Suhair Reis (N/A) | Mouaffaq Makkiya (N/A) | Muhammad Ali Nasser (N/A) | Mahdi Khairbek (N/A) |
| 2003 | Yahya Ayyash (N/A) | Rafiq Darwish (N/A) | Adnan Beitar (Ba'ath) | Ahmad Diwani (N/A) | Abd al-Qadir Bazido (N/A) | Youssef Hassan (N/A) | Bilal Mathbout (N/A) | Fawaz Nassour (Ind.) | Jamil al-Assad (Ba'ath) | Nizar Ismail (N/A) | Mahmoud Alio (N/A) | Ibrahim Baddour (Ba'ath) | Labib Alia (N/A) | Suhair Reis (N/A) | Josephine Nassar (N/A) | Namir Ghanem (N/A) | Suhail Othman (N/A) |
| 2005 by-election | Yahya Ayyash (N/A) | Rafiq Darwish (N/A) | Adnan Beitar (Ba'ath) | Ahmad Diwani (N/A) | Abd al-Qadir Bazido (N/A) | Youssef Hassan (N/A) | Bilal Mathbout (N/A) | Fawaz Nassour (Ind.) | Jaafar al-Khair (Ba'ath) | Nizar Ismail (N/A) | Mahmoud Alio (N/A) | Ibrahim Baddour (Ba'ath) | Labib Alia (N/A) | Suhair Reis (N/A) | Josephine Nassar (N/A) | Namir Ghanem (N/A) | Suhail Othman (N/A) |
| 2007 | Kamal Salameh (Ba'ath) | Hassan Ali (Ba'ath) | Adnan Beitar (Ba'ath) | Mahasin Fateh (Ba'ath) | Muhammad Ajil (Ba'ath) | Saer Qudsiya (Ba'ath) | Zakaria Salwayeh (Ind.) | Fawaz Nassour (Ind.) | Jaafar al-Khair (Ba'ath) | Salim Abboud (Ba'ath) | Fatima Fwaiti (Ba'ath) | Ibrahim Baddour (Ba'ath) | Khaldoun Qassam (Ba'ath) | Nawfal Nawfal (ASUP) | Abd al-Razzaq Darji (SCP-B) | Sari Haddad (SUP) | Mahdi Khairbek (Ind.) |
| 2012 | Saadallah Safia (Ba'ath) | Sameer al-Khatib (Ba'ath) | Ammar al-Assad (Ba'ath) | Fayhaa Tarifli (Ba'ath) | Muhammad Ajil (Ba'ath) | Nadim Mansoura (Ba'ath) | Wafaa Maala (Ba'ath) | Fawaz Nassour (Ind.) | Badih Saqour (Ind.) | Iskandar Jarada (SCP-B) | Ayham Jreikos (Ba'ath) | Ali Muhammad (Ba'ath) | Kamel Zantout (Ba'ath) | Muhammad Bilal (Ba'ath) | Maysaa Saleh (Ba'ath) | Nabhan Issa (Ba'ath) | Ali Makhlouf (Ind.) |
| 2016 | Iskandar Haddad (Ba'ath) | Sameer al-Khatib (Ba'ath) | Ammar al-Assad (Ba'ath) | Fayhaa Tarifli (Ba'ath) | Muhammad Ajil (Ba'ath) | Bassem Sudan (Ba'ath) | Zuhair Ramadan (Ba'ath) | Fawaz Nassour (Ind.) | Mustafa Kheirbek (Ba'ath) | Nabil Saleh (Ind.) | Ayham Jreikos (Ba'ath) | Sameer Nassir (SSNP) | Samer Shiha (Ba'ath) | Mazen Omran (Ba'ath) | Nizar al-Skif (Ba'ath) | Adnan al-Zarf (Ind.) | Nour Shaghri (Ind.) |
| 2020 | Iskandar Haddad (Ba'ath) | Sameer al-Khatib (Ba'ath) | Ammar al-Assad (Ba'ath) | Maysaa Salih (Ba'ath) | Muhammad Ajil (Ba'ath) | Bassem Sudan (Ba'ath) | Rasem Masri (Ind.) | Fawaz Nassour (Ind.) | Mustafa Kheirbek (Ba'ath) | Hasan Kousa (Ba'ath) | Ayham Jreikos (Ba'ath) | Malek Habib (Ba'ath) | Ayman Ahmad (Ba'ath) | Thaer Hassan (Ba'ath) | Bashir Ghalawunji (Until 2024: Ba'ath From 2024: ASUP) | Nabil Elias (Ind.) | Zain al-Abidin Abbas (Ind.) |
| 2024 | Iskandar Haddad (Ba'ath) | Rafiq al-Alouni (Ba'ath) | Ammar al-Assad (Ba'ath) | Eva Hor (Ba'ath) | Yousef Shahin (Ba'ath) | Haitham Omran (Ba'ath) | Rasem Masri (Ind.) | Sobhi Abbas (Ind.) | Jihad Barakat (Ba'ath) | Razaan Murtada (Ba'ath) | Ayham Jreikos (Ba'ath) | Ahmad Hamidoush (Ba'ath) | Ayman Ahmad (Ba'ath) | Amer Ghareeb (Ba'ath) | Bashir Ghalawunji (Until 2024: Ba'ath From 2024: ASUP) | Nabil Elias (Ind.) | Zain al-Abidin Abbas (Ind.) |
