= Homs (former People's Assembly electoral district) =

Former electoral district of Syria's national legislature

- Former electoral district for the People's Assembly
- Location of Homs within Syria
- Governorate: Homs
- Population: 1,803,000 (2011)
- Area: 42,223 km^{2}

Former electoral district
- Created: 1973
- Abolished: 2025
- Seats: List: 23 (1990–2025); 18 (1973–1990)
- Created from: List: Al-Qaryatayn; Homs; Jubb al-Jarrah; Tadmur; Talkalakh
- Replaced by: List: Al-Qusayr and al-Mukharram; Ar-Rastan; Homs; Tadmur; Talkalakh

Homs (Arabic: حمص) was an electoral district used to elect members of the Syrian People's Assembly between 1973 and 2025.

== Electoral system ==
The electoral system used to elect the People's Assembly was introduced in 1973 and remained in use until the assembly's dissolution in 2025. Each governorate formed a single, large electoral district, except for Aleppo Governorate, which was divided into two districts: the city of Aleppo and the rural districts of Aleppo Governorate. Within each district, seats were awarded on a block-vote basis, with the candidates receiving the largest number of votes taking all of the seats allocated to it, and the assembly was composed of representatives of two sectors, "workers and peasants" and "other sectors of the people", with the former guaranteed at least half of its seats nationally. The number of seats, and their distribution among districts, was left to the president of the republic to set by decree rather than being fixed in law; the total was raised from 186 to 195 in 1981 and from 195 to 250 in 1990, after which the distribution among the fifteen electoral districts was not changed.

All Syrian citizens aged 18 and over were entitled to vote, other than those under legal guardianship, those with a mental illness affecting their legal capacity, and those convicted of a felony or a "dishonourable" misdemeanour, while serving members of the armed forces and police were barred from voting and from standing as candidates; candidates were further required to be at least 25 years old and to have held Syrian nationality for at least five years, a period raised to ten under the 2011 and 2014 electoral laws. During the 2011 reform of the electoral law, the replacement of this system was discussed because of its weak representativeness, but the large-district, block-vote system was retained; the reform instead moved the administration of elections from the Ministry of Interior and provincial governors to an independent Supreme Judicial Committee for Elections, a structure carried over into a further law passed in 2014 that consolidated the rules for presidential, parliamentary and local-council elections into a single statute.

Beyond being considered unrepresentative — a majoritarian, large-district system of a kind rejected by most electoral systems worldwide — the system has also been criticised for the unevenness of its distribution of seats between governorates. Based on the number of registered voters at the 2012 election, the average was around 59,000 voters per seat nationally, but the ratio varied considerably: about 37,800 voters per seat in Damascus and 51,500 in Tartus, compared with 71,700 in Al-Hasakah and 69,500 in the rural districts of Aleppo Governorate, with no mechanism beyond a presidential decree governing the size of constituencies or the allocation of seats between them.

== Members ==
Elections	MPA (Party)	MPA (Party)	MPA (Party)	MPA (Party)	MPA (Party)	MPA (Party)	MPA (Party)	MPA (Party)	MPA (Party)	MPA (Party)	MPA (Party)	MPA (Party)	MPA (Party)	MPA (Party)	MPA (Party)	MPA (Party)	MPA (Party)	MPA (Party)	MPA (Party)	MPA (Party)	MPA (Party)	MPA (Party)	MPA (Party)
1973	Abd al-Latif Ismail (N/A)	Ali Idris (N/A)	Abd al-Aziz al-Shafi (N/A)	Ali Haydar (N/A)	Mahmoud al-Ramadan (N/A)	Afif Khuzam (N/A)	Bissam al-Fayyad (N/A)	Ali Hilal (N/A)	Ahmad Talib (N/A)	Tawfiq al-Naqri (N/A)	Abd al-Nafi al-Sibai (N/A)	Said al-Sutli (N/A)	Fuad Yazji (N/A)	Muhammad Mahmoud (N/A)	Adnan Youssef al-Musalli (N/A)	Muhammad Nuri al-Rifai (N/A)	Philip Kaba (N/A)	Muhammad Diya Malluhi (N/A)	18 seats				
1977	Idris Abbas (N/A)	Ali Idris (N/A)	Abd al-Razzaq Ayyoub (N/A)	Marwan al-Saleh (N/A)	Adham al-Rajab (N/A)	Nur al-Din Khaddour (N/A)	Nazih Said (N/A)	Abd al-Aziz al-Mulhim (Until 2012: Ba'ath; From 2012: Ind.)	Ghalib al-Najib (N/A)	Tawfiq al-Naqri (N/A)	Ali Abbas (N/A)	Shaban Shahin (N/A)	Shakir Barghout (N/A)	Mikit Anini (N/A)	Mahmoud Mallouk (N/A)	Maurice Salibi (SCP)	Muhammad Abu al-Nour Tayyara (N/A)	Abd al-Majid Tarabulsi (N/A)	18 seats				
1981	Muhammad Ghazi Tayyara (N/A)	Ismail al-Qasim (N/A)	Mahmoud al-Diab (N/A)	Tamim Issa (N/A)	Abd al-Hadi al-Assad (N/A)	Ali Haydar (N/A)	Nazih Said (N/A)	Abd al-Aziz al-Mulhim (Until 2012: Ba'ath; From 2012: Ind.)	Ahmad Talib (N/A)	Tawfiq al-Naqri (N/A)	Hiyam al-Soufi (N/A)	Shaban Shahin (N/A)	Ibrahim al-Jaour (N/A)	Ibrahim Ibrahim (N/A)	Sabaa al-Sabaa (N/A)	Munif Shukri (N/A)	Said Farzat (N/A)	Kamal al-Shaghouri (N/A)	18 seats				
1984 by-election	Muhammad Ghazi Tayyara (N/A)	Ismail al-Qasim (N/A)	Mahmoud al-Diab (N/A)	Tamim Issa (N/A)	Abd al-Hadi al-Assad (N/A)	Ali Haydar (N/A)	Nazih Said (N/A)	Abd al-Aziz al-Mulhim (Until 2012: Ba'ath; From 2012: Ind.)	Ahmad Talib (N/A)	Khadr al-Youssef (N/A)	Hiyam al-Soufi (N/A)	Shaban Shahin (N/A)	Ibrahim al-Jaour (N/A)	Ibrahim Ibrahim (N/A)	Sabaa al-Sabaa (N/A)	Munif Shukri (N/A)	Said Farzat (N/A)	Kamal al-Shaghouri (N/A)	18 seats				
1986	Muhammad Ghazi Tayyara (N/A)	Mahmoud Marouf (N/A)	Mahmoud al-Diab (N/A)	Saadallah al-Naqri (N/A)	Abd al-Hadi al-Assad (N/A)	Hikmat al-Khouli (N/A)	Abd al-Karim al-Marai (N/A)	Abd al-Aziz al-Mulhim (Until 2012: Ba'ath; From 2012: Ind.)	Shakir Barghouth (N/A)	Muhammad Amin al-Hassami (N/A)	Hiyam al-Soufi (N/A)	Maurice Salibi (SCP)	Abd al-Majid Tarabulsi (N/A)	Ibrahim Ibrahim (N/A)	Sabaa al-Sabaa (N/A)	Wael al-Bunni (N/A)	Said Farzat (N/A)	Kamal al-Shaghouri (N/A)	18 seats				
1990	Muhammad Ghazi Tayyara (N/A)	Mahmoud Marouf (N/A)	Mahmoud al-Diab (N/A)	Marwan Houriyeh (N/A)	Elias al-Lati (N/A)	Hikmat al-Khouli (N/A)	Huda al-Kurdi (N/A)	Abd al-Aziz al-Mulhim (Until 2012: Ba'ath; From 2012: Ind.)	Mustafa al-Issa (N/A)	Haidar Abbas (N/A)	Jumaa al-Hamoud (N/A)	Nazih Said (N/A)	Mahmoud al-Fadous (Ind.)	Ahmad Darbouli (N/A)	Muhammad Yasser al-Saqqa (N/A)	Mashhour Gharibeh (N/A)	Muhammad al-Aqraa (N/A)	Omar Bakkour (N/A)	Shahadeh Mayhoub (Ind.)	Ali al-Khoudour (N/A)	Ahmad al-Khalid (N/A)	Saleh Tlass (N/A)	Bahjat Rajoub (N/A)
1994	Taqi al-Younes (N/A)	Ali Buaiti (N/A)	Ibtisam Razzouq (N/A)	Abd al-Rahim Fadel (N/A)	Muhammad Ghassan al-Sibai (N/A)	Khadr al-Naim (N/A)	Fuad Salama (N/A)	Abd al-Aziz al-Mulhim (Until 2012: Ba'ath; From 2012: Ind.)	Mustafa al-Issa (N/A)	Taha al-Maghribi (N/A)	Jumaa al-Hamoud (N/A)	Shaban Shahin (N/A)	Mahmoud al-Fadous (Ind.)	Adnan Khuzaam (N/A)	Muhammad Yasser al-Saqqa (N/A)	Ibrahim Haswa (N/A)	Salma Ayyash (N/A)	Mataniyus Asfoura (N/A)	Shahadeh Mayhoub (Ind.)	Ahmad al-Sheikh (Ind.)	Tahir Ayyoub (N/A)	Ahmad Tarraf (N/A)	Youssef al-Nasser (N/A)
1998	Youssef al-Shaar (N/A)	Qassem al-Harb (N/A)	Mahmoud al-Diab (N/A)	Nihad Zantah (N/A)	Muhammad Khalid al-Haraki (N/A)	Khadr al-Naim (N/A)	Zuhair Jbour (N/A)	Abd al-Aziz al-Mulhim (Until 2012: Ba'ath; From 2012: Ind.)	Iqbal Ibrahim (N/A)	Taha al-Maghribi (N/A)	Abd al-Karim al-Hisni (N/A)	Adiba Hamwi (N/A)	Mahmoud al-Fadous (Ind.)	Umaima Khaddour (N/A)	Khalid al-Mansour (N/A)	Ibrahim Haswa (N/A)	Abd al-Bari al-Tahhan (N/A)	Ammar Daraq al-Sibai (N/A)	Shahadeh Mayhoub (Ind.)	Ahmad al-Sheikh (Ind.)	Issam al-Masri (N/A)	Abd al-Wahhab Awda (N/A)	Abdallah Tlass (N/A)
2003	Ibtisam al-Sayyid Suleiman (N/A)	Bushra Masouh (N/A)	Muhadhdhab Rajoub (N/A)	Muhammad Ghassan al-Masri (N/A)	Muhammad Hassan al-Daroubi (N/A)	Khadr al-Naim (N/A)	Abd al-Karim al-Melhem (N/A)	Abd al-Aziz al-Mulhim (Until 2012: Ba'ath; From 2012: Ind.)	Zuhair Tarraf (Ind.)	Muhammad al-Asaad (Ba'ath)	Adnan al-Ahdab (N/A)	Jirjis al-Shannour (N/A)	Mahmoud al-Fadous (Ind.)	Umaima Khaddour (N/A)	Shaban Shaheen (N/A)	Motaz Ebara (N/A)	Ahmad Qasham (Ba'ath)	Ammar Daraq al-Sibai (N/A)	Shahadeh Mayhoub (Ind.)	Ahmad al-Sheikh (Ind.)	Abdo al-Najib (Ind.)	Muhammad Zuhair Ghanoum (N/A)	Abdallah Tlass (N/A)
2007	Najat Attallah (Ba'ath)	Abd al-Muati Mashlab (Ba'ath)	Hassan al-Ikhwan (Ba'ath)	Maher al-Jajeh (SCP-B)	Abdallah Taqtaq (Ba'ath)	Muhammad Abbas (Ba'ath)	Imad Ghalayoun (NCP)	Abd al-Aziz al-Mulhim (Until 2012: Ba'ath; From 2012: Ind.)	Zuhair Tarraf (Ind.)	Muhammad al-Asaad (Ba'ath)	Firas al-Salloum (Ind.)	Fadia Deeb (Ba'ath)	Mahmoud al-Fadous (Ind.)	Hussein Rahma (SUP)	Fajr al-Issa (Ba'ath)	Hassan al-Saqqa (Ba'ath)	Ahmad Qasham (Ba'ath)	Muhammad Farhan Sahloul (SSNP)	Shahadeh Mayhoub (Ind.)	Ahmad al-Sheikh (Ind.)	Abdo al-Najib (Ind.)	Muhammad Safouq al-Naseef (Ind.)	Wael Mulhem (Ind.)
2012	Umaima Khaddour (Ba'ath)	Iyad Suleiman (Ba'ath)	Jamal Rabaa (Ba'ath)	Maher al-Jajeh (SCP-B)	Raif Ali (Ba'ath)	Saji Taama (Ba'ath)	Sanaa Abu Zaid (Ba'ath)	Abd al-Aziz al-Mulhim (Until 2012: Ba'ath; From 2012: Ind.)	Zuhair Tarraf (Ind.)	Shaaban al-Hassan (Ba'ath)	Muhammad Deeb al-Yousef (Ba'ath)	Fadia Deeb (Ba'ath)	Mishaal al-Hamoud (Ba'ath)	Elias Shahin (SSNP)	Ibrahim al-Mahmoud (Ba'ath)	Abdulqader al-Jaaour (Ba'ath)	Abdul-Muti Mishlab (Ba'ath)	Muhammad al-Shami (Ba'ath)	Nadia Kseibi (Ba'ath)	Badee al-Droubi (Ind.)	Abdo al-Najib (Ind.)	Muhammad Zuhair Ghannoum (Ind.)	Wael Mulhem (Ind.)
2015 by-election	Umaima Khaddour (Ba'ath)	Iyad Suleiman (Ba'ath)	Jamal Rabaa (Ba'ath)	Maher al-Jajeh (SCP-B)	Raif Ali (Ba'ath)	Saji Taama (Ba'ath)	Sanaa Abu Zaid (Ba'ath)	Abd al-Aziz al-Mulhim (Until 2012: Ba'ath; From 2012: Ind.)	Zuhair Tarraf (Ind.)	Shaaban al-Hassan (Ba'ath)	Muhammad Deeb al-Yousef (Ba'ath)	Fadia Deeb (Ba'ath)	Mishaal al-Hamoud (Ba'ath)	Elias Shahin (SSNP)	Ibrahim al-Mahmoud (Ba'ath)	Abdulqader al-Jaaour (Ba'ath)	Abdul-Muti Mishlab (Ba'ath)	Muhammad al-Shami (Ba'ath)	Nadia Kseibi (Ba'ath)	Badee al-Droubi (Ind.)	Ziad al-Talib (Ind.)	Saleh Maarouf (Ba'ath)	Wael Mulhem (Ind.)
2016	Tawfiq Iskandar (Ba'ath)	Rana Suleiman (Ba'ath)	Jamal Rabaa (Ba'ath)	Sami Amin (Ba'ath)	Muhammad Raad (Ba'ath)	Saji Taama (Ba'ath)	Sanaa Abu Zaid (Ba'ath)	Abd al-Aziz al-Mulhim (Until 2012: Ba'ath; From 2012: Ind.)	Muhammad Maarouf al-Sebai (Ba'ath)	Mayouf al-Dhiab (Ba'ath)	Hazzar al-Daqs (Ba'ath)	Fadia Deeb (Ba'ath)	Mishaal al-Hamoud (Ba'ath)	Bashar al-Yaziji (SSNP)	Jirjis al-Shannour (SCP-B)	Saleh Maarouf (Ba'ath)	Ahmad al-Ali (Ba'ath)	Muhammad al-Sebai (Ba'ath)	Muhammad Nizar Sharfo (Ba'ath)	Badee al-Droubi (Ind.)	Mehran Madi (Ba'ath)	Firas al-Salloum (Ind.)	Wael Mulhem (Ind.)
2018 by-election	Tawfiq Iskandar (Ba'ath)	Rana Suleiman (Ba'ath)	Muhammad Saleh al-Raee (Ba'ath)	Sami Amin (Ba'ath)	Muhammad Raad (Ba'ath)	Saji Taama (Ba'ath)	Sanaa Abu Zaid (Ba'ath)	Abd al-Aziz al-Mulhim (Until 2012: Ba'ath; From 2012: Ind.)	Muhammad Maarouf al-Sebai (Ba'ath)	Mayouf al-Dhiab (Ba'ath)	Hazzar al-Daqs (Ba'ath)	Fadia Deeb (Ba'ath)	Mishaal al-Hamoud (Ba'ath)	Bashar al-Yaziji (SSNP)	Jirjis al-Shannour (SCP-B)	Saleh Maarouf (Ba'ath)	Ahmad al-Ali (Ba'ath)	Muhammad al-Sebai (Ba'ath)	Muhammad Nizar Sharfo (Ba'ath)	Badee al-Droubi (Ind.)	Mehran Madi (Ba'ath)	Firas al-Salloum (Ind.)	Wael Mulhem (Ind.)
2020	Abd al-Hamid al-Naqri (Ba'ath)	Khalil Ibrahim Khalil (Ba'ath)	Nidal Ammar (Ba'ath)	Jweida Thaljah (Ba'ath)	Muhammad Raad (Ba'ath)	Muhammad Hassan al-Najjar (Ba'ath)	Mughith Ibrahim (Ba'ath)	Zuheir Tarraf (Ind.)	Nasser al-Nasser (Ind.)	Mayouf al-Dhiab (Ba'ath)	Hazzar al-Daqs (Ba'ath)	Fadia Deeb (Ba'ath)	Muhammad al-Shami (Ba'ath)	Nihad Samaan (SSNP)	Mundhir Ibrahim (Ba'ath)	Muhammad Suleiman al-Abrash (NCP)	Mustafa al-Maarouf (Ba'ath)	Haydar Abboud (Ba'ath)	Ahd al-Sukkari (Ba'ath)	Badee al-Droubi (Ind.)	Youssef al-Salamah (Ba'ath)	Firas al-Salloum (Ind.)	Wael Mulhem (Ind.)
2021 by-election	Abd al-Hamid al-Naqri (Ba'ath)	Khalil Ibrahim Khalil (Ba'ath)	Nidal Ammar (Ba'ath)	Jweida Thaljah (Ba'ath)	Muhammad Raad (Ba'ath)	Muhammad Hassan al-Najjar (Ba'ath)	Mughith Ibrahim (Ba'ath)	Zuheir Tarraf (Ind.)	Nasser al-Nasser (Ind.)	Mayouf al-Dhiab (Ba'ath)	Hazzar al-Daqs (Ba'ath)	Bassam al-Muhammad (Ba'ath)	Muhammad al-Shami (Ba'ath)	Nihad Samaan (SSNP)	Mundhir Ibrahim (Ba'ath)	Muhammad Suleiman al-Abrash (NCP)	Mustafa al-Maarouf (Ba'ath)	Haydar Abboud (Ba'ath)	Ahd al-Sukkari (Ba'ath)	Badee al-Droubi (Ind.)	Youssef al-Salamah (Ba'ath)	Firas al-Salloum (Ind.)	Wael Mulhem (Ind.)
2024	Abd al-Hamid al-Naqri (Ba'ath)	Maalla al-Khader (Ba'ath)	Shehadeh Matar (Ba'ath)	Hazem al-Nasser (Ba'ath)	Ali al-Assaf (Ba'ath)	Nizar al-Farra (Ba'ath)	Ahmad al-Ali (Ba'ath)	Raef Ali (Ba'ath)	Nasser al-Nasser (Ind.)	Mayouf al-Dhiab (Ba'ath)	Afeef Dallo (Ind.)	Muhammad Khaled Maani (Ba'ath)	Sayil Dawoud (Ba'ath)	Aref al-Sheikh (Ba'ath)	Mundhir Ibrahim (Ba'ath)	Ahed al-Sukkari (Ba'ath)	Asia Ayoub (Ba'ath)	Jamal Ali Suleiman (ASUP)	Jack al-Shami (SSNP)	Hani Oudeh (Ind.)	Youssef al-Salamah (Ba'ath)	Firas al-Salloum (Ind.)	Wael Mulhem (Ind.)
