= Tell Abyad (Chamber of Deputies electoral district) =

Former electoral district of Syria's national legislature

- Former electoral district for the Chamber of Deputies

Former electoral district
- Created: 1961
- Abolished: 1963
- Seats: One
- Created from: Raqqa
- Replaced by: Raqqa

Tell Abyad (Arabic: تل أبيض) was an electoral district used to elect members of the Syrian Chamber of Deputies between 1961 and 1963.

== Electoral system ==
In 1947, amid public protests and calls for a more representative system, Syria replaced the 1928 electoral system of indirect elections with a direct electoral system. The number of seats was set before every election and based on the proportional population size of each electoral district. The system was amended in 1949 to lower the voting age to 18 and women were given the right to vote.

== Deputies ==
Elections	Deputy (Party)
1961	Khalaf al-Hassan (Independent)
