= 1961 Syrian parliamentary election =

- 1–2 December 1961

All 172 seats in the Constituent and Parliamentary Assembly 87 seats needed for a majority
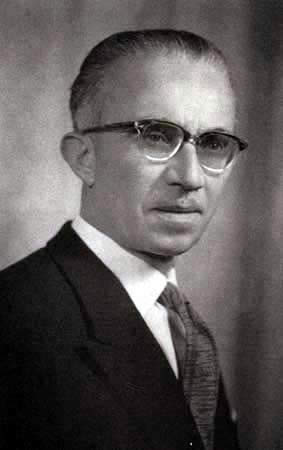

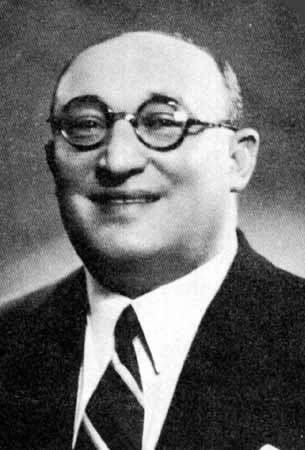

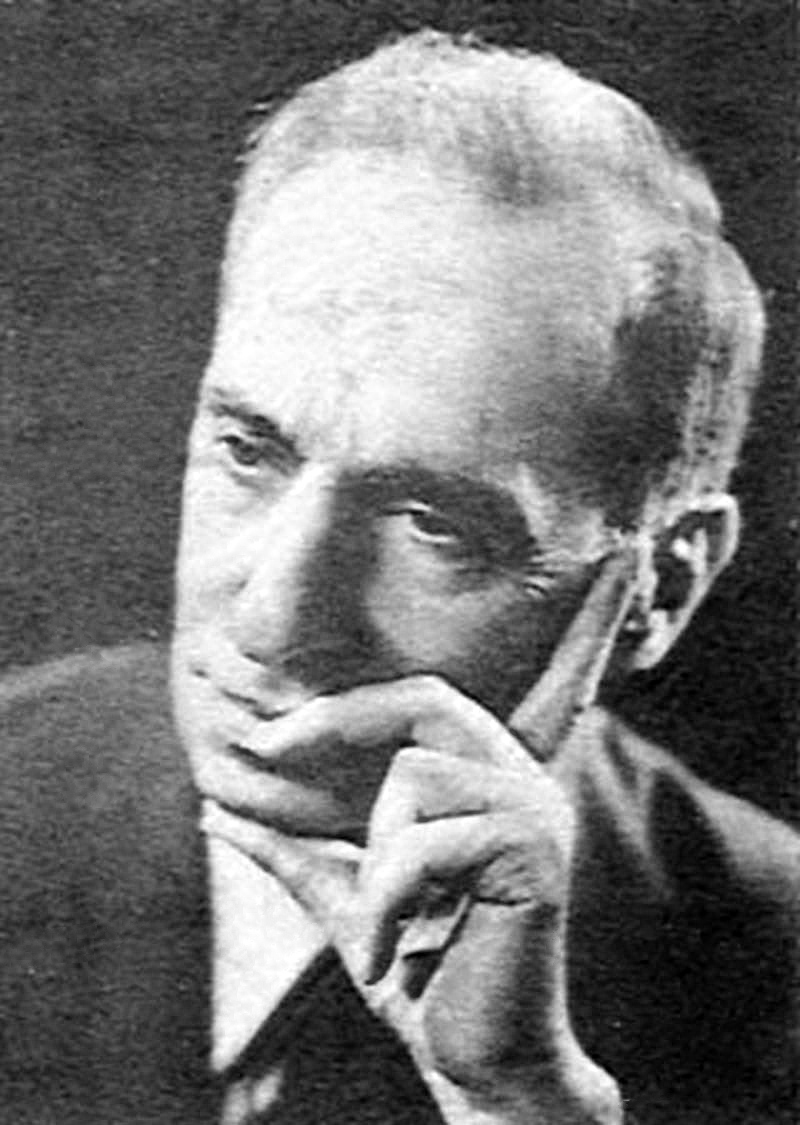
	First party	Second party	Third party
Leader	Nazim al-Kudsi	Sabri al-Asali	Michel Aflaq
Party	People's	National Party	Ba'ath Party
Last election	30	19	22
Seats won	33	21	20
Seat change	▲3	▲2	▼2
- Results by governorate
Prime Minister before election
Izzat al-Nuss
Military
Elected Prime Minister
Maarouf al-Dawalibi
People's

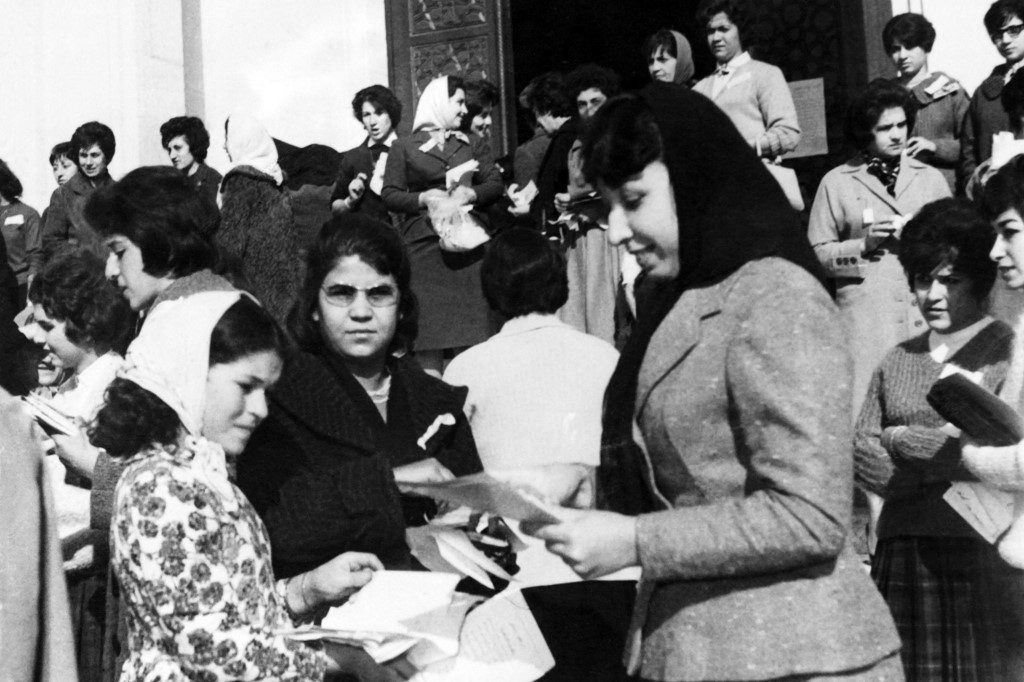
Syrian women outside a polling station for the 1961 Syrian parliamentary election

Parliamentary elections were held in Syria on 1 and 2 December 1961. The People's Party remained the largest party in parliament, winning 33 of the 172 seats. These were the last multi-party elections in Syria before the 1963 Ba'athist-led Syrian coup d'état.

== Results ==
Party	Seats	+/–
People's Party	33	+3
National Party	21	+2
Ba'ath Party	20	–2
Muslim Brotherhood	10	+10
Arab Liberation Movement	4	+2
Socialist Cooperation Party	0	–2
Syrian Social Nationalist Party	0	–2
Syrian Communist Party	0	–1
Independents	84	+20
Total	172	+30
Source: Nohlen et al.

== See also ==
- List of members of the Parliament of Syria, 1961
