= 1950 Syrian presidential election =

- 5 September 1950
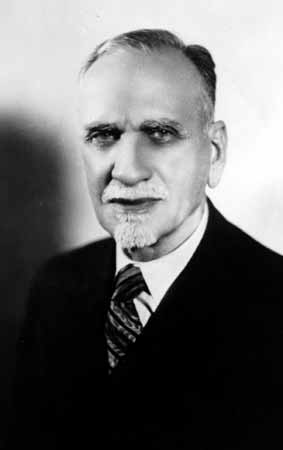
Candidate	Hashim al-Atassi
Party	People's Party
Electoral vote	92
Percentage	91.1%
President before election
Hashim al-Atassi
People's Party
Elected President
Hashim al-Atassi
People's Party

The 1950 Syrian presidential election was held on 5 September 1950, when the newly constituted Chamber of Deputies — the former Constituent Assembly, which had declared itself a parliamentary chamber earlier that day — elected Hashim al-Atassi as President of the Syrian Republic with 92 votes.

== Background ==
Following the coup against Sami al-Hinnawi, the Constituent Assembly elected Hashim al-Atassi as provisional head of state in December 1949.

On Monday, 4 September 1950, the Constituent Assembly opened its penultimate sitting at 5:30 pm, discussing several matters including the Assembly's conversion into a parliamentary chamber, the vote on the new constitution, and the election of the President of the Republic.

The Assembly's final sitting was held the following day, Tuesday, 5 September 1950. The new constitution was adopted, and the Assembly declared its own work concluded, dissolving itself as a constituent body and reconstituting itself as a new Chamber of Deputies for a four-year term. The newly formed Chamber then convened a special evening sitting to elect the new President of the Republic.

== Voting ==
The special sitting opened with a roll call of absent members, after which the Speaker of the Chamber announced that the sitting was dedicated to electing the President of the Republic and that members would vote by secret ballot. Abd al-Baqi Nizam al-Din, Muhammad al-Mubarak, and Raif al-Malqi were asked to assist the overseers in overseeing the vote. Following brief remarks, voting began, with overseers carrying the ballot boxes to members before collecting and counting the ballots.

== Results ==
Of 101 members who cast ballots, Hashim al-Atassi received 92 votes. Rushdi al-Kikhya and Mustafa al-Siba'i each received one vote, and seven ballots were left blank.

Candidate	Party	Votes	%
Hashim al-Atassi	People's Party	92	97.87
Rushdi al-Kikhya	People's Party	1	1.06
Mustafa al-Siba'i	Muslim Brotherhood	1	1.06
Total		94	100.00
Valid votes		94	93.07
Invalid/blank votes		7	6.93
Total votes		101	100.00
Registered voters/turnout		114	88.60

== Aftermath ==
The Speaker of the Chamber announced the result to applause from members and stated that he would proceed, with the members of the Chamber's Bureau, to inform President-elect al-Atassi personally. The sitting was suspended for half an hour while the Speaker, Rushdi al-Kikhya, and the Bureau travelled to the presidential palace to convey the result.

President al-Atassi subsequently travelled in procession from the palace to the Chamber, preceded by the Republican Guard on motorcycles. He was received with official honours on arrival, with the gendarmerie band playing the Syrian national anthem, and was welcomed at the entrance by the Prime Minister, ministers, and a number of deputies. He addressed the Chamber before returning to the presidential palace in procession. A 21-gun salute was fired in celebration of the election, and government buildings and official institutions were illuminated for the occasion.

That evening, Nazim al-Qudsi, the outgoing Prime Minister, went to the presidential palace and submitted his government's resignation to President al-Atassi.

== See also ==
- Constituent Assembly (Syria, 1949–1950)
- 5th Chamber of Deputies of Syria
- Syrian Constitution of 1950
