= Second Nazim al-Qudsi government =

1950 Syrian government

- 44th government of the Syrian Republic

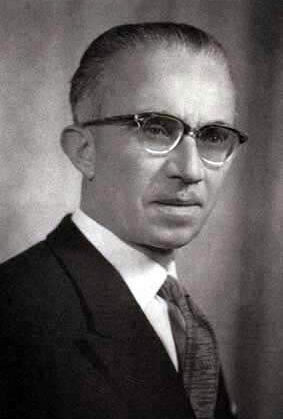
- Date formed: 4 June 1950
- Date dissolved: 8 September 1950

People and organisations
- Head of State: Hashim al-Atassi
- Prime Minister: Nazim al-Qudsi
- No. of ministers: 8
- Member parties: ▌People's Party; ▌Independent
- Opposition parties: ▌National Party; ▌Ba'ath Party; ▌Muslim Brotherhood; ▌Arab Socialist Movement; ▌SSNP

History
- Outgoing formation: Constitution of 1950
- Legislature term: Constituent Assembly
- Predecessor: K. al-Azm III
- Successor: al-Qudsi III

The Second Nazim al-Qudsi government was the forty-fourth government in the history of modern Syria and the twenty-ninth and last administration of the First Syrian Republic. Formed on 8 September 1950, it was the third government to serve during the second presidency of Hashim al-Atassi and the second cabinet headed by Nazim al-Qudsi.

The government was established during the first phase of the military influence of Adib Shishakli following the political upheavals of 1949. Its tenure was marked by growing tensions between the civilian political leadership, particularly the People's Party, and senior military officers who sought a greater role in state affairs.

After approximately seven months in office, the government resigned following the adoption of a permanent constitution on 5 September 1950.

== Composition ==
Portfolio	Minister	Took office	Left office	Party
Prime Minister	Nazim al-Qudsi	4 June 1950	8 September 1950	People's Party
Minister of Foreign Affairs	Nazim al-Qudsi	4 June 1950	8 September 1950	People's Party
Minister of Justice	Zaki al-Khatib	4 June 1950	8 September 1950	Independent
Minister of Finance	Hasan Jabbarah	4 June 1950	8 September 1950	Independent
Minister of National Economy	Shakir al-Aas	4 June 1950	8 September 1950	People's Party
Minister of Agriculture	Shakir al-Aas	4 June 1950	8 September 1950	People's Party
Minister of Public Works	George Shalhoub	4 June 1950	8 September 1950	People's Party
Minister of Education	Farhan al-Jandali	4 June 1950	8 September 1950	People's Party
Minister of Health and Ambulance	Farhan al-Jandali	4 June 1950	8 September 1950	People's Party
Minister of National Defense	Fawzi Selu	4 June 1950	8 September 1950	Independent
Minister of Interior	Rashad Barmada	4 June 1950	8 September 1950	People's Party

== See also ==
- Council of Ministers (Syria)
- List of Syrian governments
- Government ministries of Syria
- List of prime ministers of Syria
