= First Nazim al-Qudsi government =

1949 Syrian government

- 42nd government of the Syrian Republic

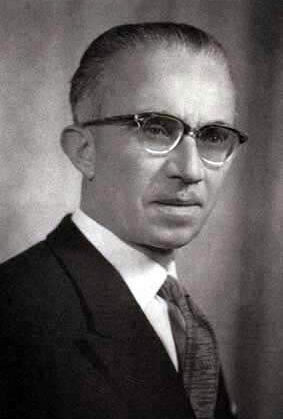
- Date formed: 24 December 1949
- Date dissolved: 27 December 1949

People and organisations
- Head of State: Hashim al-Atassi
- Prime Minister: Nazim al-Qudsi
- No. of ministers: 9
- Member parties: ▌People's Party; ▌Muslim Brotherhood; ▌Independent
- Opposition parties: ▌National Party; ▌Ba'ath Party; ▌Youth Party; ▌SSNP

History
- Incoming formation: Provisional Constitution of 1949
- Legislature term: Constituent Assembly
- Predecessor: al-Atassi II
- Successor: K. al-Azm III

The First Nazim al-Qudsi government was the forty-second government in the history of modern Syria and the twenty-seventh administration of the First Syrian Republic. Formed on 24 December 1949, it was the first government to serve during the second presidency of Hashim al-Atassi and the first cabinet headed by Nazim al-Qudsi, leader of the People's Party, which held the largest parliamentary bloc at the time. The government was established following the political transition after the 1949 military coups and represented an effort to restore constitutional civilian rule.

== Composition ==
Portfolio	Minister	Took office	Left office	Party
Prime Minister	Nazim al-Qudsi	24 December 1949	27 December 1949	People's Party
Minister of Foreign Affairs	Nazim al-Qudsi	14 August 1949	27 December 1949	People's Party
Minister of National Defense	Faydi al-Atassi	24 December 1949	27 December 1949	People's Party
Minister of National Economy	Faydi al-Atassi	14 August 1949	27 December 1949	People's Party
Minister of Justice	Zaki al-Khatib	24 December 1949	27 December 1949	Independent
Minister of Education	Hani al-Sibai	24 December 1949	27 December 1949	People's Party
Minister of Interior	Ahmad Qanbar	24 December 1949	27 December 1949	People's Party
Minister of Public Works	Muhammad al-Mubarak	24 December 1949	27 December 1949	Muslim Brotherhood
Minister of Finance	Shakir al-Aas	24 December 1949	27 December 1949	People's Party
Minister of Agriculture	Mahmoud al-Azm	24 December 1949	27 December 1949	Independent
Minister of Health	George Shalhoub	24 December 1949	27 December 1949	People's Party

== See also ==
- Council of Ministers (Syria)
- List of Syrian governments
- Government ministries of Syria
- List of prime ministers of Syria
