= Constituent Assembly (Syria, 1949–1950) =

Constituent convention of Syria from 1949 to 1950

Constituent Assembly الجمعية التأسيسية

Type
- Type: Constituent assembly of Second Syrian Republic

History
- Founded: 12 December 1949
- Disbanded: 5 September 1950
- Preceded by: Chamber of Deputies (4th)
- Succeeded by: Chamber of Deputies (5th)

Leadership
- Speaker: Rushdi al-Kikhya (People's Party)
- Seats: 114

Elections
- First election: 1949 Syrian Constituent Assembly election

Meeting place
- Chamber of Deputies Building, Damascus

The Constituent Assembly (Arabic: الجمعية التأسيسية) was the legislative body of the Second Syrian Republic formed following the 1949 Syrian Constituent Assembly election. It was tasked with drafting the new Constitution of the Syrian Republic after the fall of Hosni al-Zaim's rule. After the adoption of the Constitution in 1950, the Constituent Assembly declared itself a Chamber of Deputies in accordance with the provisions of the new Constitution.

== Background ==
A Syrian woman votes during the 1949 elections.

Following the March 1949 coup led by Husni al-Za'im, constitutional life in Syria was suspended. Subsequent coups, including that of Sami al-Hinnawi in August 1949, led to the restoration of civilian rule and the decision to elect a constituent assembly.

Elections were held on 15 November 1949, resulting in the formation of a 114-member assembly representing major political forces, including the National and People's parties, as well as independents. Notably, the elections saw the entry of the first representative of the Ba'ath Party into parliament.

Voter turnout was reportedly low relative to the elections' significance, reaching no more than 45% in Damascus and 31% in Aleppo. This was attributed in part to the National Party's call for a boycott, after the al-Atassi government refused to reinstate the 1930 constitution or reconvene the parliament that had been dissolved by Husni al-Za'im, treating the new election as a substitute for that reconvening. Despite this, the election was widely regarded as the first free parliamentary election in modern Syrian history, conducted by secret ballot under close government supervision; both partisan Islamist and left-nationalist newspapers described it at the time as among the most transparent elections held in Syria to that date, and local and foreign journalists alike noted a degree of electoral freedom without precedent in the Levant.

== Government ==
Prime Minister	Party	Term of office	Government
Nazim al-Qudsi	People's Party	24–27 December 1949	al-Qudsi I
Khalid al-Azm	Independent	27 December 1949 – 4 June 1950	K. al-Azm III
Nazim al-Qudsi	People's Party	4 June – 5 September 1950	al-Qudsi II

== Bureau ==
Position	Name	Party	Tenure
Speaker	Rushdi al-Kikhya	People's Party	12 December 1949 – 5 September 1950
Deputy Speakers	Zaki al-Khatib	People's Party	12 December 1949 – 5 September 1950
Deputy Speakers	Raif al-Malqi	Independent	12 December 1949 – 5 September 1950
Secretary	Esber al-Yaziji		12 December 1949 – 5 September 1950
Secretary	Muhammad al-Mubarak	Independent	12–29 December 1949
Secretary	Abd al-Salam Haydar		29 December 1949 – 5 September 1950
Overseer	Said Ishaq		12 December 1949 – 5 September 1950
Overseer	Ahmad Qanbar	People's Party	12 December 1949 – 5 September 1950
Overseer	Abd al-Qadir Rahmu		12 December 1949 – 5 September 1950

== Elections of the Burea ==
=== 12 December 1949 ===
The Constituent Assembly elected its bureau on the first sitting on 12 December 1949.

Election of the Speaker
Candidate	Party	Votes	%
Rushdi al-Kikhya	People's Party	98	98.00
Mustafa al-Siba'i	Muslim Brotherhood	2	2.00
Total		100	100.00
Valid votes		100	92.59
Invalid/blank votes		8	7.41
Total votes		108	100.00
Registered voters/turnout		114	94.74

Election of the Deputy Speakers
Candidate	Party	Votes	%
Zaki al-Khatib	People's Party	74	69.16
Raif al-Malqi	Independent	64	59.81
Abd al-Baqi Nizam ad-Din	People's Party	63	58.88
Hikmat al-Hiraki	Independent	4	3.74
Ismat Bozan Shahin		2	1.87
Ahmad Qanbar	People's Party	1	0.93
Mustafa al-Siba'i	Muslim Brotherhood	1	0.93
Qasim al-Hunaydi		1	0.93
Said Haydar		1	0.93
Hassan al-Hakim		1	0.93
Qasim al-Ayish		1	0.93
Hayil al-Surur		1	0.93
Total		214	100.00
Valid votes		107	98.17
Invalid/blank votes		2	1.83
Total votes		109	100.00
Registered voters/turnout		114	95.61

Election of the Secretaries
Candidate	Party	Votes	%
Esber al-Yaziji		55	51.89
Muhammad al-Mubarak	Independent	54	50.94
Ali al-Dandashi		34	32.08
Ahmad Ali Kamil	Independent	34	32.08
Abd al-Salam Haydar		10	9.43
Issam al-Mahayiri		6	5.66
Aref al-Turuqji		6	5.66
Ismat Bozan Shahin		5	4.72
Muhammad Ata al-Jirudi		3	2.83
Shakir al-Aas	People's Party	1	0.94
Total		208	100.00
Valid votes		106	99.07
Invalid/blank votes		1	0.93
Total votes		107	100.00
Registered voters/turnout		114	93.86

Election of the Secretaries
Candidate	Party	First round		Second round	
Candidate	Party	Votes	%	Votes	%
Said Ishaq		74	69.16		
Ahmad Qanbar	People's Party	67	62.62		
Abd al-Qadir Rahmu		58	54.21	63	58.33
Najdat al-Najjari	National Party	33	30.84	40	37.04
Farid Marhaj		28	26.17		
Abd al-Hasib Raslan	Independent	18	16.82		
Abd al-Salam Haydar		8	7.48		
Mustafa al-Dukhan		7	6.54		
Ahmad Ali Kamil	Independent	6	5.61		
Ali al-Dandashi		3	2.80		
Abd al-Rahman al-Azm	Independent	3	2.80		
Husni al-Barazi	Independent	2	1.87		
Ibrahim Tayfur		1	0.93		
Qasim al-Hunaydi		1	0.93		
Total		309	100.00	103	100.00
Valid votes		107	100.00	105	97.22
Invalid/blank votes		0	0.00	3	2.78
Total votes		107	100.00	108	100.00
Registered voters/turnout		114	93.86	114	94.74

== Committees ==
To fulfil its constituent function, the Assembly elected a committee of 33 deputies tasked with drafting the constitution. Deputies were divided into three parliamentary sections to elect the committee members. The committee elected its Bureau on 4 January as follows:

Committees	Burea		Party
Constitution Committee	Chair	Nazim al-Qudsi (until 4 June)	People's Party
Constitution Committee	Chair	Said Haydar (from 23 July)	
Constitution Committee	Vice-Chair	Zaki al-Khatib (until 4 June)	Independent
Constitution Committee	Vice-Chair	Latif Ghanima (from 23 July)	People's Party
Constitution Committee	Rapporteur	Abdul-Wahab Hawmad	People's Party

Despite being a constituent assembly, the Assembly also maintained the standard parliamentary committees. Except for the Foreign Affairs Committee, which was elected on 3 and 4 March, the parliamentary committees were elected on 18 April 1950 in the same manner as the Constitution Committee. On 22 April, the committees elected their Bureaux as follows:

Committees	Burea		Party
Agriculture Committee	Chair	Mahmoud al-Azm	
Agriculture Committee	Vice-Chair	Faiq Manan Ismail Zadeh	
Agriculture Committee	Rapporteur	Jadallah Izz al-Din	
Budget Committee	Chair	Said Ishaq	
Budget Committee	Vice-Chair	Muhammad Khayr al-Hariri	National Party
Budget Committee	Rapporteur	Hamid al-Khoja	Independent
Education Committee	Chair	Munir al-Ajlani	Independent
Education Committee	Vice-Chair	Issam al-Mahayiri	SSNP
Education Committee	Rapporteur	Aref al-Turuqji	
Financial Laws Committee	Chair	Said Haydar (until 22 July)	
Financial Laws Committee	Chair	Muhammad al-Shawwaf (from 23 July)	People's Party
Financial Laws Committee	Vice-Chair		
Financial Laws Committee	Rapporteur	Rizqallah Antaki	People's Party
Foreign Affairs Committee (Bureau was elected on 29 June)	Chair	Jalal al-Sayyid	Arab Ba'ath Movement
Foreign Affairs Committee (Bureau was elected on 29 June)	Vice-Chair	Said Ishaq	
Foreign Affairs Committee (Bureau was elected on 29 June)	Rapporteur	Muhammad Ata al-Jirudi	
Health and Social Affairs Committee	Chair	George Shalhub	People's Party
Health and Social Affairs Committee	Vice-Chair	Dikran Jerejian	People's Party
Health and Social Affairs Committee	Rapporteur	Muhammad al-Ashuri	
Interior Committee	Chair	Ali Bozo	People's Party
Interior Committee	Vice-Chair	Ihsan al-Hisni	
Interior Committee	Rapporteur	Abdullah al-Tamer	People's Party
Judicial Committee	Chair	Said Haydar	
Judicial Committee	Vice-Chair	Latif Ghanima	People's Party
Judicial Committee	Rapporteur	Muhammad Ata al-Jirudi	
National Defense Committee	Chair	Farid Marhaj	
National Defense Committee	Vice-Chair	Ilyas Dummar	
National Defense Committee	Rapporteur	Abd al-Aziz Hasan	
National Economy Committee	Chair	Hassan al-Hakim	Independent
National Economy Committee	Vice-Chair	Shakir al-Aas	People's Party
National Economy Committee	Rapporteur	Hamid al-Khoja	Independent
Petitions Committee	Chair	Ahmad Qanbar	People's Party
Petitions Committee	Vice-Chair	Qadri al-Mufti	
Petitions Committee	Rapporteur	Anwar Ibrahim Pasha	
Public Works Committee	Chair	Nazim Said al-Kayyali	
Public Works Committee	Vice-Chair	Khalil Bashur	
Public Works Committee	Rapporteur	Muhammad al-Ashuri	

== Constitutional work ==
The Constitution Committee held preliminary meetings and elected two subcommittees, a preparatory committee and a smaller drafting committee. The preparatory committee met 45 times to deliberate proposals from the drafting committee, reviewing around fifteen European and Asian constitutions, including several Arab constitutions. The consolidated findings of both subcommittees were then referred to the general Constitution Committee for revision; the general committee held more than 29 meetings and read the draft constitution twice before presenting it to the Assembly for approval, amendment, or rejection in April 1950. The drafting process across all three committees took roughly three months.

The draft was not adopted outright, owing to disagreement over several contested articles. The Assembly elected a joint cross-party committee to reach a compromise on these provisions, which concluded its work in July 1950. Despite the December 1949 coup led by Adib Shishakli, the Assembly continued its work, and a majority approved the committee's final amendments on 5 September 1950.

The adopted constitution affirmed, in its first article, Syria's Arab character, its republican parliamentary system, and its status as an indivisible political unit. Its second article declared that sovereignty belonged to the people, on the principle of "government of the people, by the people, and for the people" — a formulation drawing on North American and French constitutional models, adapted with the added qualifiers "democratic" and "sovereign" to suit Syria's political circumstances at the time. Article 3, concerning the state religion, generated extensive debate; it was ultimately retained in the same form as in the 1930 constitution, requiring only that the President of the Republic be Muslim while guaranteeing freedom of belief for all citizens regardless of sect.

The constitution was noted for provisions on individual freedoms and social and economic equality (Article 28), including the right to work (Article 26), state protections on working hours and conditions and the right to unionise (Article 29), and provisions expanding education, particularly in rural areas (Article 28). Commentators have contrasted it with the 1930 constitution for its greater emphasis on civic rights and public freedoms and its stronger social and economic reform agenda. Constitution Committee chair Abdul-Wahab Hawmad described the document's achievement in this area as addressing basic material needs, calling it "a matter of bread and an empty stomach." Muslim Brotherhood-aligned leader Mustafa al-Siba'i praised the constitution as the first in Syria issued by a body elected by the nation itself, independent of foreign or authoritarian influence.

The constitution has also been criticised for including articles that were difficult to amend, reflecting the drafting elite's concerns, following two successive coups, that politicians or the military might otherwise exploit constitutional flexibility for their own advantage. Historian Gordon Torrey noted that the document's more than 160 detailed articles left it open to extensive reinterpretation, given its focus on specific provisions rather than foundational principles.

== Conversion into the Chamber of Deputies ==
Article 165, appended to the end of the constitution, provided for the Constituent Assembly's conversion into a parliamentary chamber. Although President Hashim al-Atassi was expected to dissolve the Assembly and call new parliamentary elections, the People's Party, which held a majority within the Assembly, feared that new elections might return the National Party to power or bring in rival leftist forces. It accordingly persuaded independent members of the importance of converting the Assembly directly into a parliament, to avoid a return to political instability.

A majority of the Assembly agreed to the conversion, assuming the parliamentary powers set out under the new constitution. The constitution was formally promulgated the following day, on 5 September 1950.

== See also ==
- Constituent Assembly (Syria, 1928–1929)
- Constituent and Parliamentary Assembly
