= Third Khalid al-Azm government =

1949–1950 Syrian government

- 43rd government of the Syrian Republic

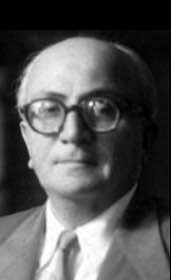
- Date formed: 27 December 1949
- Date dissolved: 4 June 1950

People and organisations
- Head of State: Hashim al-Atassi
- Prime Minister: Khalid al-Azm
- No. of ministers: 10
- Member parties: ▌People's Party; ▌Muslim Brotherhood; ▌Arab Socialist Movement; ▌Independent
- Opposition parties: ▌National Party; ▌Ba'ath Party; ▌SSNP

History
- Legislature term: Constituent Assembly
- Predecessor: al-Qudsi I
- Successor: al-Qudsi II

The Third Khalid al-Azm government was the forty-third government in the history of modern Syria and the twenty-eighth administration of the First Syrian Republic. Formed on 28 December 1949, it was the second government to serve during the second presidency of Hashim al-Atassi and the third cabinet headed by Khalid al-Azm.

The government was formed under pressure from senior military officers who opposed any rapprochement with Iraq based on the concept of Greater Syria or the Fertile Crescent union. The government reflected the growing influence of the military in Syrian political affairs following the coups of 1949. It received the confidence of the Chamber of Deputies by a vote of 93 in favour, 7 against, with the remaining members abstaining.

During its tenure, the government approved the establishment of the Port of Latakia, a major infrastructure project financed by Saudi Arabia. The government resigned after approximately six months in office following a dispute between Prime Minister Khalid al-Azm and Akram al-Hourani over constitutional provisions related to limits on agricultural land ownership. Al-Hourani's influence in the dispute was strengthened by his role as the representative of the military within the government, reflecting the continuing political weight of the armed forces in Syria.

== Composition ==
Portfolio	Minister	Took office	Left office	Party
Prime Minister	Khalid al-Azm	27 December 1949	4 June 1950	Independent
Minister of Foreign Affairs	Khalid al-Azm	27 December 1949	4 June 1950	Independent
Minister of Justice	Faydi al-Atassi	27 December 1949	4 June 1950	People's Party
Minister of Health and Ambulance	Fathallah Asyun	27 December 1949	4 June 1950	People's Party
Minister of Interior	Sami Kabbarah	27 December 1949	4 June 1950	Independent
Minister of National Defense	Akram al-Hourani	27 December 1949	4 June 1950	Arab Socialist Movement
Minister of Education	Hani al-Sibai	24 December 1949	4 June 1950	People's Party
Minister of Public Works	Muhammad al-Mubarak	24 December 1949	4 June 1950	Muslim Brotherhood
Minister of Agriculture	Abd al-Baqi Nizam ad-Din	27 December 1949	4 June 1950	People's Party
Minister of National Economy	Maarouf al-Dawalibi	27 December 1949	4 June 1950	People's Party
Minister of Finance	Abd al-Rahman al-Azm	27 December 1949	4 June 1950	Independent

== See also ==
- Council of Ministers (Syria)
- List of Syrian governments
- Government ministries of Syria
- List of prime ministers of Syria
