= Mohammad Farouk Tayfour =

Syrian politician (born 1945)

- محمد فاروق طيفور
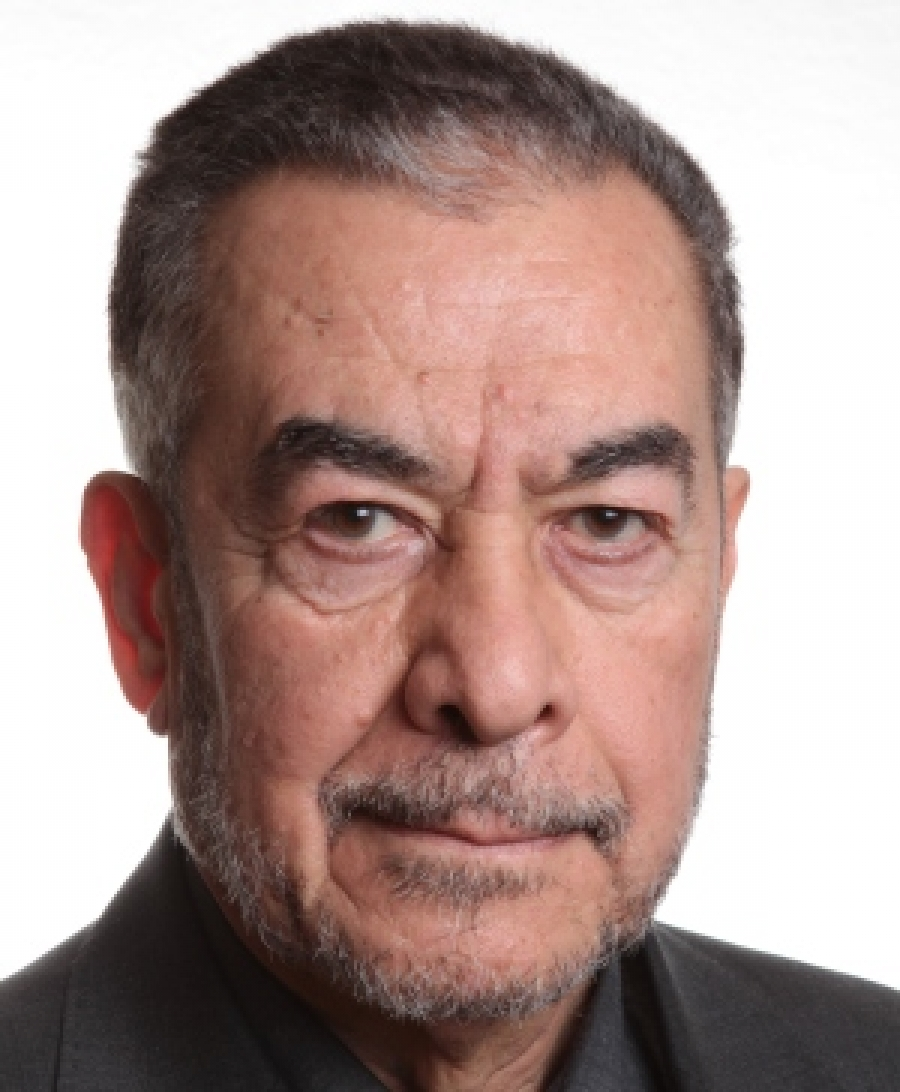
- Tayfour in 2012

Vice President of the Syrian National Coalition
- In office 6 July 2013 – 12 July 2014
- President: Ahmad Jarba

Vice President of the Syrian National Council
- In office November 2012 – 6 July 2013
- President: George Sabra

Deputy Leader of the Muslim Brotherhood in Syria
- Incumbent
- Assumed office 3 August 2010
- President: Mohammad Riad al-Shaqfeh; Mohammad Hikmat Walid

Personal details
- Born: 1945 (age 80–81) Aleppo, Syria
- Party: Muslim Brotherhood in Syria
- Other political affiliations: Syrian National Coalition (2013–2025)
- Education: University of Aleppo (BA)

Mohammad Farouk Tayfour (Arabic: محمد فاروق طيفور, romanized: Muḥammad Fārūq Ṭayfūr) is a Syrian politician and Islamist leader who has served as Deputy Leader of the Muslim Brotherhood in Syria since 2010.

He was elected to the General Secretariat and as a Vice President of the Syrian National Council in November 2012, and in July 2013 became a Vice President of the National Coalition for Syrian Revolutionary and Opposition Forces, one of the principal opposition coalitions during the Syrian civil war.

Tayfour was born in Aleppo in 1945 into a family with roots in Hama. He graduated with a degree on civil engineering from the Faculty of Architecture at the University of Aleppo in 1968. He joined the Syrian Muslim Brotherhood at an early age and became the organization's head in Hama in 1973. Between 1973 and 1975, he served as a member of the Brotherhood's Shura Council. During the 1980s, while in exile, he was a member of the Political Bureau of the National Alliance for the Salvation of Syria in Baghdad, where he was also responsible for the alliance's military office.

In July 2010, Tayfour was elected Deputy Leader (Deputy General Guide) of the Muslim Brotherhood in Syria under General Guide Mohammad Riad al-Shaqfeh, and remained in the position under his successor, Mohammad Hikmat Walid. Following the outbreak of the Syrian revolution, he became one of the Brotherhood's principal representatives within the Syrian opposition.

Tayfour participated in the establishment of the Syrian National Council in 2011 and subsequently served as one of its vice presidents. In 2013, he was elected Vice President of the Syrian National Coalition. He later participated in the 2014 Geneva II peace conference and was a member of the first High Negotiations Committee formed by the Syrian opposition in 2015.
