= Ali Sadreddine Al-Bayanouni =

Syrian Muslim Brotherhood member

- علي صدر الدين البيانوني
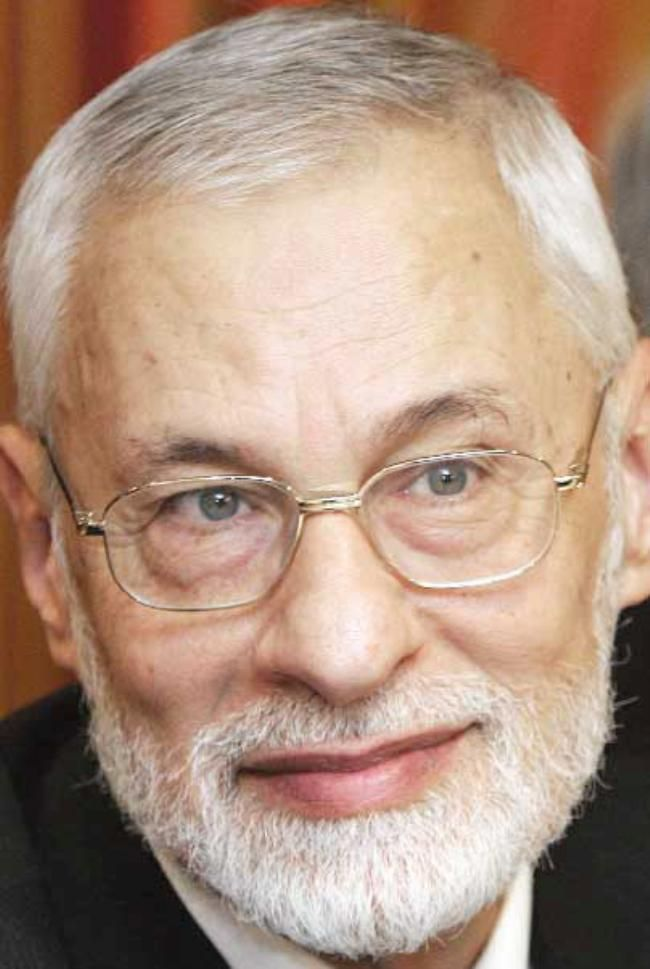

Supreme Guide of the Syrian Muslim Brotherhood
- In office 1996 – August 2010
- Preceded by: Hassan Howeidi
- Succeeded by: Mohammad Riad al-Shaqfeh

Deputy Controller General of the Syrian Muslim Brotherhood
- In office 1977–unknown

Personal details
- Born: 1938 (age 87–88) Aleppo, Mandatory Syrian Republic
- Citizenship: Syrian
- Education: University of Damascus
- Occupation: Lawyer

Military service
- Allegiance: Syria
- Branch: Syrian Army
- Years: 1959–1960

Ali Sadreddine Al-Bayanouni (Arabic: علي صدر الدين البيانوني) is a Muslim Brotherhood leader in exile in London. He was born in 1938 in Aleppo and brought up in a religious Sunni Muslim family, where his father and grandfather were both well-known Muslim scholars. He joined the Muslim Brotherhood while in secondary school, in 1954, and went on to graduate with a law degree from the University of Damascus in 1963. He served as a reserve officer in the Syrian Army from 1959 to 1960. Bayanouni became a member of the Syrian Muslim Brotherhood's Shura Council and Executive Office in 1972. Due to his membership in the Muslim Brotherhood, Bayanouni was imprisoned from 1975 to 1977. After his time in prison, he emerged to become the deputy leader of the Brotherhood in 1977. He left Syria two years later and eventually settled in Jordan, where he remained for twenty years. He arrived in Britain as a political refugee in 2000, after the Jordanian authorities requested he leaves the country.

In the wake of the unrest in Syria he has called for the end of the Bashar al-Assad government and the convention of "a free conference of all the nationalist forces in Syria" which would enable "Syrians to develop a collective national alternative".

== See also ==
- Muslim Brotherhood of Syria
