= Mohammad Riad al-Shaqfeh =

- محمد رياض الشقفة

Supreme Guide of the Syrian Muslim Brotherhood
- In office August 2010 – 6 November 2014
- Deputy: Mohammad Farouk Tayfour
- Preceded by: Ali Sadreddine Al-Bayanouni
- Succeeded by: Mohammad Walid

Personal details
- Born: 1944 (age 81–82) Hama, Syrian Republic
- Citizenship: Syrian

Mohammad Riad al-Shaqfeh (Arabic: محمد رياض الشقفة) is a former leader of the Muslim Brotherhood of Syria. He was born in 1944 in Hama. He is the eleventh Supreme Guide of the Syrian Muslim Brotherhood, taking over from Ali Sadreddine Al-Bayanouni from August 2010 until 6 November 2014. Mohammad Farouk Tayfour served as his deputy.

== Early life ==
al-Shaqfeh was born in Hama in 1944 into a family of well known scholars. His father, Sheikh Khalid al-Shaqfeh, was President of the Society of Hama.

He attended high school in Hama, graduating in 1963, and then studied at the University of Damascus's Faculty of Engineering, graduating with a bachelor's degree in civil engineering in 1968.

== Muslim Brotherhood career ==
al-Shaqfeh joined the Muslim Brotherhood in 1961, whilst he was still in high school. He became a member of the Muslim Brotherhood Management Centre in Hama in 1978, and then head of the centre in 1979. He left Syria at the end of 1980. He was elected to the leadership of the Brotherhood in 1983, and became a member of the executive committee of the National Alliance to save Syria in 1990, and a member of the Alliance's Political Bureau in 1999.

In July 2010 the General Committee of the Syrian Muslim Brotherhood met in Istanbul for their leadership elections. The group elected al-Shaqfeh to succeed al-Bayanouni as Supreme Leader. A month after his election al-Shaqfeh declared his intent to continue the suspension of anti-government activities by the Muslim Brotherhood, and spoke in October 2010 of his hope of resolving issues with the Syrian government through the help of Turkey. He also expressed a willingness to change the name of the organisation, were his other demands met, and the group allowed to return to Syria, although there was no response from the Syrian government.

== Role in the Syrian Civil War ==
At the beginning of the protests the Brotherhood, under the auspices of al-Shaqfeh, refrained from participation, only issuing a statement on the protests at the end of April 2011. The statement called for the overthrow of the Bashar al-Assad government. The Brotherhood later took part in the establishment of the Syrian National Council in Istanbul in October 2011, and was believed to be the most powerful group within the Council. The Brotherhood was represented by al-Shaqfeh and his deputy, Mohammad Farouk Tayfour.

== See also ==
- Muslim Brotherhood of Syria
