= Second Hashim al-Atassi government =

1949 Syrian government

- 41st government of the Syrian Republic

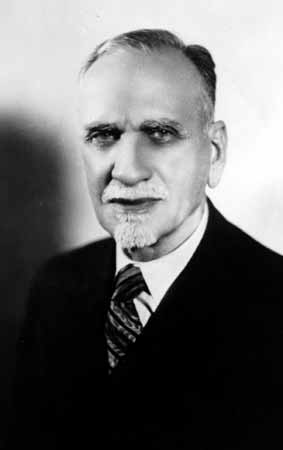
- Date formed: 14 August 1949
- Date dissolved: 14 December 1949

People and organisations
- President: Vacant (Note: Sami al-Hinnawi, as Commander-in-Chief of the Army and Armed Forces, was the de facto leader of Syria.)
- Prime Minister: Hashim al-Atassi
- No. of ministers: 11 (until August); 10 (from August)
- Member parties: ▌People's Party; ▌National Party; ▌Ba'ath Party; ▌Youth Party; ▌Independent

History
- Incoming formation: Aug. 1949 coup d'état
- Outgoing formation: Provisional Constitution of 1949
- Legislature term: None
- Predecessor: M. al-Barazi
- Successor: al-Qudsi I

The Second Hashim al-Atassi government was the forty-first government in the history of modern Syria and the twenty-sixth administration of the First Syrian Republic. Formed on 17 August 1949 following the military coup led by Sami al-Hinnawi it served as a provisional government under the leadership of Hashim al-Atassi. The cabinet was conceived as a government of national unity, bringing together representatives of various political tendencies during a period of transition following the overthrow of the Husni al-Za'im regime.

The government's principal task was to oversee the election of a Constituent Assembly, which was charged with restoring constitutional government and determining the future political order of the country. Following successful elections and the convening of the assembly, Hashim al-Atassi was elected president of the republic. In accordance with constitutional practice, the government resigned shortly thereafter, ending its tenure after approximately four months in office. The cabinet played a significant role in facilitating Syria's return to civilian rule following a period of military domination.

== Composition ==
| Portfolio | Minister | Took office | Left office | Party |
|---|---|---|---|---|
| Prime Minister | Hashim al-Atassi | 14 August 1949 | 14 December 1949 | People's Party |
| Minister of Finance | Khalid al-Azm | 14 August 1949 | 14 December 1949 | Independent |
| Minister of Interior | Rushdi al-Kikhya | 14 August 1949 | 14 December 1949 | People's Party |
| Minister of Foreign Affairs | Nazim al-Qudsi | 14 August 1949 | 14 December 1949 | People's Party |
| Minister of National Defense | Abdullah Atfeh | 14 August 1949 | 14 December 1949 | Independent |
| Minister of State | Adel al-Azma | 14 August 1949 | 14 December 1949 | National Party |
| Minister of National Economy | Faydi al-Atassi | 14 August 1949 | 14 December 1949 | People's Party |
| Minister of State | Fathallah Asyun | 14 August 1949 | 14 December 1949 | People's Party |
| Minister of Public Works and Transport | Majd al-Din al-Jabri | 14 August 1949 | 17 August 1949 | National Party |
| Minister of Public Works and Transport | Fathallah Asyun | 17 August 1949 | 14 December 1949 | People's Party |
| Minister of Justice | Sami Kabbarah | 14 August 1949 | 14 December 1949 | Independent |
| Minister of Health and Ambulance | Sami Kabbarah | 14 August 1949 | 14 December 1949 | Independent |
| Minister of Education | Michel Aflaq | 14 August 1949 | 14 December 1949 | Ba'ath Party |
| Minister of Agriculture | Akram al-Hourani | 14 August 1949 | 14 December 1949 | Youth Party |

== See also ==
- Council of Ministers (Syria)
- List of Syrian governments
- Government ministries of Syria
- List of prime ministers of Syria
