= Muslim Brotherhood in Turkey =

Activities of the Muslim Brotherhood in Turkey

The Muslim Brotherhood in Turkey (Turkish: Türkiye'de Müslüman Kardeşler or Türkiye'de İhvânü'l-Müslimîn; Arabic: الإخوان المسلمون في تركيا, romanized: al-Ikhwān al-Muslimūn fī Turkiyā) refers to the activities of the Muslim Brotherhood in Turkey, as well as the Turkish branch of the organisation.

Logo of the Muslim Brotherhood

== History ==
In 1969, in Istanbul, the International Islamic Federation of Student Organizations was founded, where it is still headquartered. The IIFSO became the first Turkish organization that was founded by Muslim Brotherhood members.

When Necmettin Erbakan entered politics, he established good relations with the Muslim Brotherhood organization worldwide and maintained those relations. In the 1990s, Erbakan began a series of Islamist conventions that aimed to unite Muslim Brotherhood leaders worldwide to counter Western influence. In the 1970s, Recep Tayyip Erdoğan, when he was Erbakan's top advisor, had met with the Muslim Brotherhood spokesman Kamal El-Halbawy at various of conferences organized by the World Assembly of Muslim Youth. When Erbakan's MNP was banned in 1971 by the Turkish court for violating Turkey's secularism, he began establishing various parties such as the MSP, the RP, and the FP, with each party getting banned one after another. After the repetitive shutdowns, Erdoğan and a group of other Millî Görüş politicians, including Abdullah Gül, went on to establish the AKP, and while being conservative, they were much more liberal than many of Erbakan's parties. The AKP aimed to be a conservative party which is democratic, similar to the Christian democrats. Erdogan even coined the word "Conservative democracy" as to avoid using "Islamic democracy".

Erdogan eventually became the prime minister of Turkey in 2002, made various reforms such as in the education and media, weakening of the military control over the government, civilian control over the military, lifting bans on religious dresses (including headscarves), and ending discrimination against students from private religious high schools in public universities. The AKP later shifted more towards Turkish nationalism, especially around 2018 when they made an alliance with MHP, causing AKP veteran Abdullah Gül and Ahmet Davutoğlu to leave the party.

Regardless of his shift away from his former policies, and his attempts to distance himself from Islamism, Erdogan maintained relations with the Muslim Brotherhood throughout his entire career, and after Erbakan's death in 2011, several leading Muslim Brotherhood figures attended his funeral, including Mohammed Mahdi Akef and Khaled Mashal. Erdogan staunchly backed the Muslim Brotherhood and Mohamed Morsi during the Egyptian crisis, and gave 1,500 Egyptian Muslim Brotherhood members asylum in Turkey after the 2013 Egyptian coup d'état. Not only were members of the Egyptian Muslim Brotherhood allowed to stay in Turkey, many members of the Syrian Muslim Brotherhood were also based in Turkey, including Omar Mushaweh, Amr Darrag, Mahmoud Ezzat, and Talaat Fahmi.

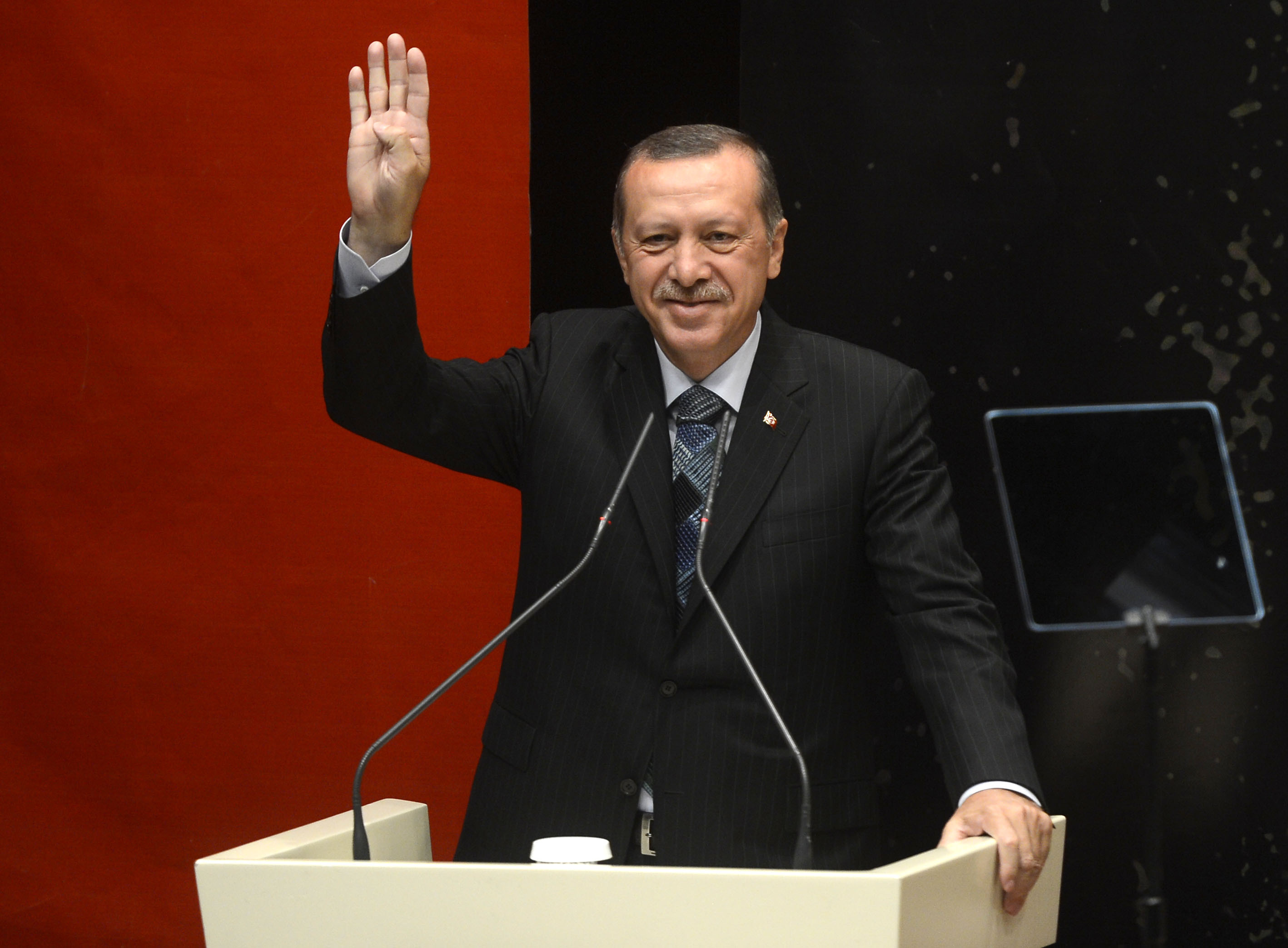
Erdogan flashes the Rabia sign

The ruling AKP's support for the Muslim Brotherhood caused Turkey's relationships with the United Arab Emirates, Saudi Arabia, and especially Egypt, to be strained. In 2017, when Saudi Arabia, Egypt, UAE, and Bahrain cut ties with Qatar and demanded the that it cuts ties with the Muslim Brotherhood, Turkey sided with Qatar. Erdoğan himself stated that the Muslim Brotherhood "is not an armed group, but an ideological organization, there would be no tolerance for the Muslim Brotherhood in Turkey if they had to do with terrorism, and we have not seen or observed any action [from them] that indicates this" in February 2017. The Muslim Brotherhood held many permitted conferences in Turkey. Days after Morsi's overthrow in July 2013, exiled Muslim Brotherhood leaders in Istanbul, which included members from Morocco, Malaysia, Mauritania, Libya, Syria, and Iraq, spoke about reinstating Muslim Brotherhood rule in Egypt.

Egyptian authorities, who constantly accuse the Turkish government of conspiring with the Muslim Brotherhood, in November 2017, detained 29 people on suspected espionage for Turkey. Egypt's General Intelligence Services stated that the suspects had been passing information to Turkey's National Intelligence Organization as part of a plan to reinstate Muslim Brotherhood rule over Egypt. In March 2019, the Turkish government announced the deportation of 12 Muslim Brotherhood members to Egypt, where they were wanted on various charges. Muslim Brotherhood members who didn't face deportation, began a campaign to pressure the government to reverse the decision.

Even after deportations, the Turkish government continued its staunch support for the Muslim Brotherhood. In April 2019, when Donald Trump announced that he was thinking about designating the Muslim Brotherhood as terrorist organization, Ömer Çelik stated that terrorist status for the Muslim Brotherhood would hurt democracy and human rights all across the Middle East, and would be the biggest act of encouragement to the Islamic State and their propaganda. The Islamic State frequently refers to the Muslim Brotherhood as the "Murtad Brotherhood", and call their politicians tawaghit and do takfir on their supporters.
