= Mustafa al-Siba'i =

Syrian politician and activist (1915–1964)

- مصطفى السباعي
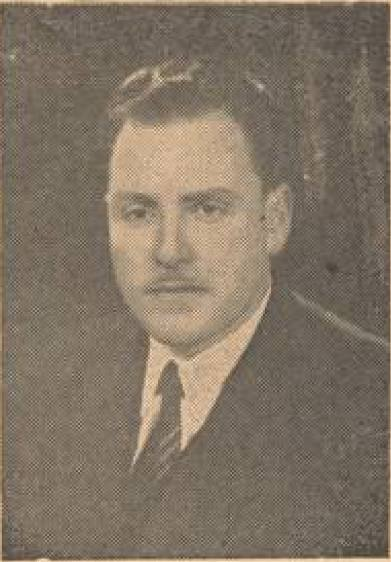
- Al-Siba'i portrait

Personal life
- Born: 1915 Homs, Syria Vilayet, Ottoman Empire
- Died: October 3, 1964 (aged 48–49) Homs, Syria
- Citizenship: Syrian
- Political party: Muslim Brotherhood in Syria
- Education: Al-Azhar University

Religious life
- Religion: Islam
- Denomination: Sunni
- Movement: Salafi

Supreme Guide of the Syrian Muslim Brotherhood
- In office 1946–1961
- Preceded by: Position established
- Succeeded by: Issam al-Attar

Mustafa al-Siba'i (Arabic: مصطفى السباعي, romanized: Muṣṭafā as-Sibāʿī) was a Syrian politician and activist. He was dean of the Faculty of Islamic Jurisprudence and the School of Law at the University of Damascus. From 1945 to 1961 he was the leader of the Islamic Socialist Front, the Syrian branch of the Muslim Brotherhood.

== Life ==
Mustafa al-Siba'i studied Islamic theology at al-Azhar University, Cairo. While in Egypt he went to lectures by Hassan al-Banna, founder of the Egyptian Muslim Brotherhood, and joined the Brotherhood in 1930. Returning to Syria, Siba'i taught at Damascus University, and in 1940 was made Dean of the Faculty of Theology. In 1941 he established the Shabab Muhammad (Youths of Muhammad), a religious paramilitary group based on the Egyptian Muslim Brotherhood. Shabab Muhammad allied itself with the National Bloc in resisting the French mandate.

In 1946, al-Siba'i founded a Syrian branch of the Muslim Brotherhood, leading it through several parliamentary campaigns. He commanded a unit of Syrian Muslim Brotherhood volunteers during the 1948 Arab–Israeli War. After the United Arab Republic was formed in 1958, Gamal Abdel Nasser outlawed the Muslim Brotherhood and arrested hundreds of members. Joining the underground, Siba'i supported the 1961 coup ending the UAR. However, the Ba'athist government which came to power in 1963 again outlawed the Muslim Brotherhood, and banned many of Siba'i's works.

Al-Siba'i's The Socialism of Islam (1959) argued that Islam was compatible with socialism. It was reprinted in Egypt and endorsed by several members of the Egyptian government, though al-Siba'i complained at the use of his book to justify Nasserism.

== Sickness and death ==
Al-Siba'i suffered from Hemiparesis for 8 years before death on 3 October 1964.

== Works ==
- Al-Din wa al-Dawla fi al-Islam (Religion and State in Islam), 1954.
- Ishtirakiyyat al-Islam (The Socialism of Islam), 1960.
- Hakaza Alamatni al-Hayat (This is How Life Taught Me), 1972.
- Some Glittering Aspects of the Islamic Civilization, 1983. Translated by Sharif Ahmad Khan.
- The Life of Prophet Muhammad: Highlights and Lessons, 2004. Translated by Nasiruddin al-Khattab.
