= Syrian Constitution of 1950 =

Defunct constitution used in Syria

Constitution of the Syrian Republic

Overview
- Original title: دستور الجمهورية السورية
- Jurisdiction: Second Syrian Republic
- Presented: 15 April 1950
- Ratified: 5 September 1950
- Date effective: September 5, 1950; 26 February 1954 (reinstated)
- System: Unitary parliamentary republic

Government structure
- Branches: Three (executive, legislative and judiciary)
- Head of state: President
- Chambers: Unicameral (Chamber of Deputies)
- Executive: President-led Council of Ministers responsible to the Chamber of Deputies; Prime Minister as head of government
- Judiciary: The Supreme Court, the Court of Cassation and other courts
- Federalism: Unitary
- First legislature: 5 September 1950
- Repealed: 2 November 1951 (first repeal); 26 February 1958 (second repeal)
- Author: Constituent Assembly
- Supersedes: Provisional Constitution of 1949 (first period); Constitution of 1953 (second period)
- Superseded by: Constitution of 1953 (first period); Provisional Constitution of the UAR (second period)

Full text
- Constitution of Syria (1950) at Wikisource
- دستور الجمهورية السورية at Arabic Wikisource

The Syrian Constitution of 1950, also known as the "Constitution of Independence," was drafted following a 1950 coup by Sami al-Hinnawi. The new government, under President Hashim al-Atassi, focused on elections and drafting a constitution. The final document which was officially adopted on 5 September 1950, aimed to limit the president's powers while increasing the authority of parliament. For the first time, the constitutional text included a clause stating that Syria is 'part of the Arab nation.'

== History ==
The drafting committee of the 1950 Syrian Constitution reviewed 15 European and Asian constitutions to ensure the highest possible standards, according to Nazim al-Qudsi. The final draft was completed by 15 April 1950, and the Constituent Assembly began discussions on 22 July. The original draft contained 177 articles, but 11 were removed, leaving 166 in the final version. Major debates included the status of Islam as the state religion, which was decided to be the religion of the president rather than the state, following the model of the 1930 constitution. Another significant discussion was whether to set a ceiling for agricultural land ownership to limit the power of feudal families, which was left open after a narrow vote. A provision for military neutrality was debated but not included, and the Constituent Assembly itself was confirmed as the parliamentary body after the constitution's adoption, despite opposition from the National Party.

The constitution also guaranteed education as a right for every citizen, making it free and compulsory, and tasked the state with eliminating illiteracy and settling nomads within ten years. In addition, it strengthened civil rights, including freedom of speech, press, assembly, and the right to a fair trial.

Although the 1950 constitution introduced significant reforms, it was short-lived. After Adib Shishakli orchestrated the 1951 coup, the constitution was suspended, and a new constitution was adopted in 1953, in which a new presidential system was implemented. The constitution was reinstated six months later by Hashim al-Atassi on 25 February 1954, but was finally superseded by a provisional constitution during Syria's union with Egypt (1958–1961).

== Sources ==
- Haddad, Ghassan Mohammed Rashad (2007). The Political History of Syria: The Making of the Syrian Constitution (in Arabic). Beirut: Dar Al-Nahar.
- Torrey, Gordon (1964). The Syrian Constitution of 1950: A Study in Constitutional Development. Oxford University Press.
