= Muslim Brotherhood in Syria =

Branch of the Sunni Islamist Muslim Brotherhood

Muslim Brotherhood in Syria الإخوان المسلمون في سوريا
- Leader: Mohammad Walid
- Deputy leader: Mohammad Farouk Tayfour
- Head of the Shura Council: Mohammad Hatem al-Tabshi
- Founders: Mustafa al-Siba'i; Muhammad al-Mubarak al-Tayyib
- Founded: 1945
- Headquarters: Damascus (Historical); Idlib (After the rebels captured Idlib during the civil war)
- Ideology: Pan-Islamism; Sunni Islamism; Islamic democracy Social conservatism Anti-communism; Anti-Ba'athism; Anti-Assadism; Anti-Zionism; Factions: Neo-Sufism; Salafism
- Political position: Right-wing to far-right
- International affiliation: Muslim Brotherhood
- People's Assembly: 25 / 210 (through affilated members)

Party flag

Website
- http://www.ikhwansyria.com

The Muslim Brotherhood in Syria (Arabic: الإخوان المسلمون في سوريا, romanized: al-Ikhwān al-Muslimūn fī Sūrīya) is the Syrian branch of the Sunni Islamist Muslim Brotherhood organization. Its objective is the transformation of Syria into an Islamic state governed by Sharia law through a gradual legal and political process.

The party strongly opposes Pan-Arabism, socialism, capitalism, nationalism, communism, liberalism, and secularism in Syria. Founded at the end of World War II, the Muslim Brotherhood of Syria was seen as one of several important political parties in the 1950s. When Syria unified with Egypt to form the United Arab Republic, the disbanding of the Muslim Brotherhood as a political party was a condition of union, one complicated by Gamal Abdel Nasser's conflict in Egypt with the Egyptian Muslim Brotherhood. The Syrian Muslim Brotherhood was banned by the government of the Syrian Arab Republic starting after the 1963 coup by the secularist, pan-Arabist Ba'ath Party. The Muslim Brotherhood played a major role in dissent against the secular Ba'ath Party during the period 1976–1982, and membership in the Brotherhood in Syria became a capital offence in 1980.

Following the Hama uprising of 1982 in the wake of the wider Islamist insurgency in Syria (1979–1982), when thousands of armed insurgents and civilians were killed by the military the Brotherhood was effectively broken as an active political force inside Syria.

The Muslim Brotherhood in exile was among the 250 signatories of the Damascus Declaration of 2005, a statement of unity by Syrian opposition including the Arab nationalist National Democratic Rally, the Kurdish Democratic Alliance, the Committees of Civil Society, the Kurdish Democratic Front, and the Movement of the Future, and calling for "peaceful, gradual," reform "founded on accord, and based on dialogue and recognition of the other".

The Muslim Brotherhood was considered the main opposition group in Syria to the government on the eve of the 2011 uprising, but failed to make a significant mark on the protests against the government. The Syrian uprising's core population of protesters came from a younger generation which had come of age in a Syria without significant Muslim Brotherhood presence. However, among the expatriated opposition, the Syrian Muslim Brotherhood has come to be seen by some as the "dominant group" or "dominant force" in the opposition during the Syrian civil war as of spring 2012.

Despite these setbacks, the MB attempted to maintain its relevance by forming alliances with rebel factions and establishing the Waad Party in 2014. However, these efforts met with limited success, as more radical Islamist groups gained prominence on the ground. By the mid-2010s, the MB's role had become more peripheral, overshadowed by other Islamist and secular groups within the fragmented Syrian opposition. Nevertheless, it remained one of the more organized political entities in exile, continuing to participate in opposition activities and dialogues concerning Syria's future.

== History ==
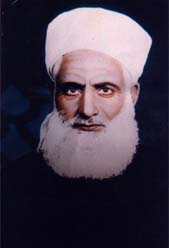
Shaykh Muhammad al-Hamid (1328 AH / 1910 C.E - 1389 AH / 1969 C.E), an Islamic scholar from Hama and major early leader of Syrian Muslim Brotherhood

Once the second most important branch of the Muslim Brotherhood, the Syrian Ikhwan had two wings – the relatively moderate Damascus wing and the militant Aleppo wing. Becoming more revolutionary and radical in the 1960s and 1970s, they aimed to overthrow the Ba'athist government that controlled Syria. In Egypt, splinter groups inspired by Sayyid Qutb were growing more violent and militant than the mainline Brotherhood. In Syria, the entire organization was affected, as the internally divided leadership failed to contain the radicalization to the splinter groups. Even though the leadership publicly disavowed the radical elements, they were unable to contain the radicalization of the group because were mostly in exile due to the brutality and violent repression of the Syrian government.

The Muslim Brotherhood in Syria was founded in the mid-1940s by Mustafa al-Siba'i and Muhammad al-Mubarak al-Tayyib, who were friends and colleagues of the founder of Egypt's Muslim Brotherhood, Hassan al-Banna. In the first years of Syrian independence the Syrian Muslim Brotherhood was part of the legal opposition, and in the 1961 parliamentary elections it won ten seats. After the 1963 coup brought the secularist, pan-Arabist Ba'ath Party to power, it was banned. The Brotherhood played a major role in the mainly Sunni-based resistance movement that opposed the secular Ba'ath Party, (since 1971 dominated by the Alawite Assad family, adding a religious element to its conflict with the Brotherhood). This conflict developed into an armed struggle in the late 1970s that climaxed in the Hama uprising of 1982, when thousands were killed by the military.

Membership in the Syrian Brotherhood became a capital offence in Syria in the 1980 (under Law No. 49) and the Brotherhood was crushed, though it retained a network of support in the country, of unknown strength, and had external headquarters in London and Cyprus. In recent years it has renounced violence and adopted a reformist platform, calling for the establishment of a pluralistic, democratic political system. For many years the leader of the Syrian Muslim Brotherhood was Ali Sadreddine Al-Bayanouni, who lives as a political refugee in London.

=== Origins ===
Towards the end of the 1930s, the ideas of Hassan al-Banna reached Syria as young Syrians, who had graduated from university in Cairo and participated in the Muslim Brotherhood there, returned home and founded associations called "Youths of Muhammad" (Shabab Muhammad), which were to become the Muslim Brotherhood in Syria. The Muslim Brotherhood in Syria was founded in the 1930s (according to lexicorient.com) or in 1945, a year before independence from France, (according to journalist Robin Wright and the Brotherhood itself). The Brotherhood states its founder was Dr. Mustafa al-Siba'i. By 1954, the Syrian association led by Mustafa al-Siba'i offered assistance to its Egyptian sister organisation, which Gamal 'Abd al-Nasser was then subjecting to severe repression.

However, it was not until the 1960s that the Syrian Brotherhood came to play a major role in politics, as part of a broad-based resistance movement, which developed into armed struggle, against the secular government. After the secular Ba'athist military coup of 8 March 1963, the new administration drastically restricted political freedoms, and concentrated power in the hands of the military and awarded prominent positions to the country's Alawite minority. Sunni Syrian Islamists – from the majority faith – did not have representation in the government. From the start, Islamic political groups, of which the Brotherhood was the most prominent, represented the strongest opposition to the government. The outlawing of Brotherhood in 1964 resulted in its radicalisation. In 1964 and 1965, strikes and mass demonstrations spread throughout Syria's major cities, especially in Hama, and were crushed by the military. In 1971, General Hafez al-Assad, an Alawite, seized power; in 1973 violent demonstrations broke out again in response to a proposed constitution that did not require the president to be a Muslim. Syria's intervention in the Lebanese civil war in 1976 on the side of the Maronites sparked renewed agitation in Syria, and assassinations began to target members of the Syrian government and prominent Alawites; the Muslim Brotherhood later claimed responsibility for most of these.

=== 1976–82 Islamist insurgency ===
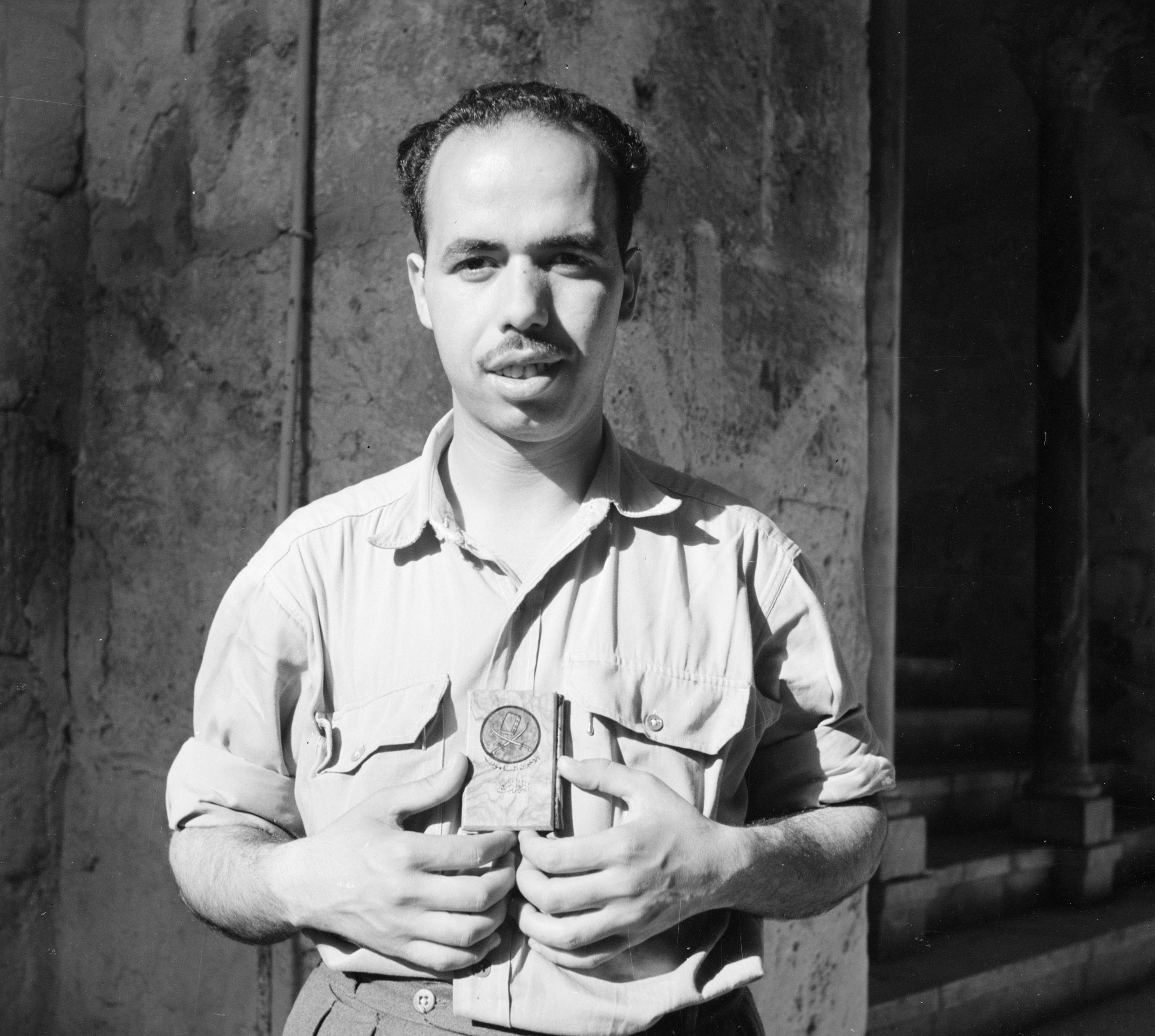
A Syrian holds a Muslim Brotherhood symbol, Aleppo, 1950.

On 16 June 1979, the Muslim Brotherhood carried out an attack on cadets at the Aleppo Artillery School, officially killing 83. Around this time, professor Yusef al-Yusef was assassinated in Aleppo. The Syrian government responded by sentencing to death about 15 prisoners, already accused of being Iraqi agents, for belonging to the Islamic resistance movement. Terrorist attacks then became a daily occurrence, particularly in Aleppo and other northern cities. The government tended to ascribe these attacks to the Brotherhood, but as the armed resistance gained widespread popular support and more loosely defined armed groups appeared, especially in poor neighborhoods, it became difficult to determine the extent of the Brotherhood's involvement.

In November 1979, a Brotherhood leaflet stated:

We reject all forms of despotism, out of respect for the very principles of Islam, and we don't demand the fall of Pharaoh so that another one can take his place. Religion is not imposed by force....

In the days leading to 8 March 1980 (the seventeenth anniversary of the Ba'thist coup), nearly all Syrian cities were paralysed by strikes and protests, which developed into pitched battles with security forces. Many organisations, both religious and secular, were involved, including the Syrian Muslim Brotherhood. The government responded with overwhelming military force, sending in tens of thousands of troops, supported by tanks and helicopters. In and around Aleppo, hundreds of demonstrators were killed, and eight thousand were arrested. By April, the uprising had been crushed.

A newspaper article by the president's brother, Rifaat al-Assad, stated that the government was prepared to "sacrifice a million martyrs" (over a tenth of Syria's population at that time) in order to stamp out "the nation's enemies". On 7 July 1980, the government passed a law making membership in the Brotherhood punishable by death. Typically, however, the administration practiced indiscriminate, collective punishment: in August, the army executed 80 residents of a block of flats in response to an attack on soldiers stationed in Aleppo. In April 1981, the army executed about 400 of Hama's inhabitants, chosen among male loyalists over the age of 14. This was as a retribution after a failed terrorist attack on an Alawite village near Hama.

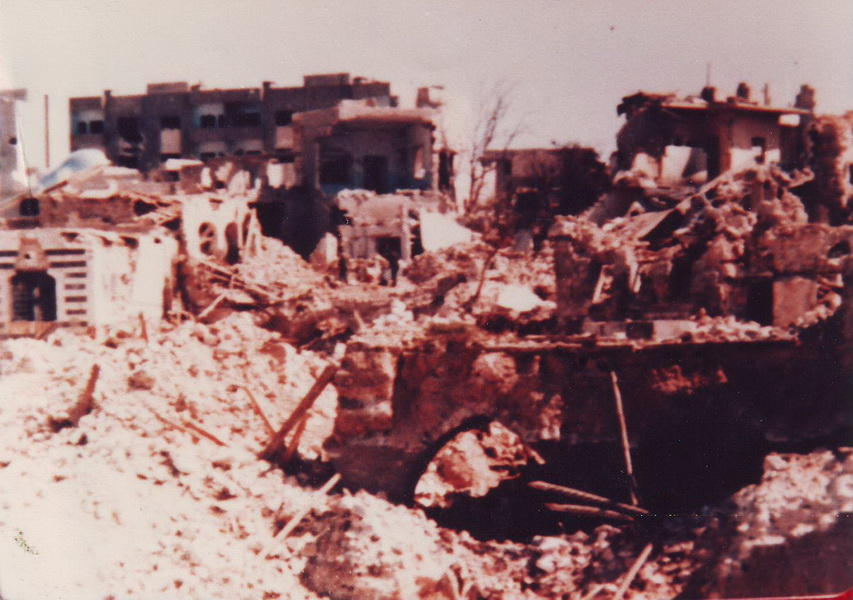
Photograph showing destruction in the al-Kilani district of Hama following the massacre.

During a 50-day moratorium on the application of the 7 July law, over a thousand Muslim Brothers surrendered to the authorities, hoping to escape the death penalty; information published about them in the official press may give some insight into the composition of the Brotherhood's membership at that time. Most of those who gave themselves up were students under twenty-five years of age, from Damascus and other large cities; others were schoolteachers, professors or engineers.

In August, September and November 1981, the Brotherhood carried out three car-bomb attacks against government and military targets in Damascus, killing hundreds of people, according to the official press. On 2 February 1982, the Brotherhood led a major insurrection in Hama, rapidly taking control of the city; the military responded by bombing Hama (whose population was about 250,000) throughout the rest of the month, killing between 10,000 and 30,000 people. The tragedy of the Hama Massacre marked the defeat of the Brotherhood, and the militant Islamic movement in general, as a political force in Syria.

=== Post-Hama era ===
Having suppressed all opposition, Hafez al-Assad released some imprisoned members of the Brotherhood in the mid-1990s. After his death in 2000, Assad was succeeded by his son, Bashar al-Assad, who initially signalled greater openness to political debate. In May 2001, encouraged by a new political climate, the Muslim Brotherhood published a statement in London rejecting political violence, and calling for a modern, democratic state. Many political prisoners, including Muslim Brothers, were pardoned and released. However, this reform was short-lived; in the same year, the few political freedoms that had been granted were abruptly revoked.

Although its leadership is in exile, the Brotherhood continues to enjoy considerable sympathy among Syrians. Riyad al-Turk, a secular opposition leader, considers it "the most credible" Syrian opposition group. The Brotherhood has continued to advocate a democratic political system; it has abandoned its calls for violent resistance and for the application of shari'a law, as well as for Sunni uprisings against Alawites. Al-Turk and others in the secular opposition are inclined to take this evolution seriously, as a sign of the Brotherhood's greater political maturity, and believe that the Brotherhood would now be willing to participate in a democratic system of government.

In a January 2006 interview, the Brotherhood's leader, Ali Sadreddine Bayanouni, "said the Muslim Brotherhood wants a peaceful change of government in Damascus and the establishment of a 'civil, democratic state', not an Islamic republic." According to Bayanouni, the Syrian government admits having detained 30,000 people, giving a fair representation of the Brotherhood's strength.

According to leaked American cables, Syrian President Bashar al-Assad allegedly called Hamas an "uninvited guest" and said "If you want me to be effective and active, I have to have a relationship with all parties. Hamas is Muslim Brotherhood, but we have to deal with the reality of their presence", comparing Hamas to the Syrian Muslim Brotherhood which was crushed by his father Hafez al-Assad. He then allegedly claimed Hamas would disappear if peace was brought to the Middle East.

=== Syrian civil war (2011–2024) ===
Unlike the MB-led insurgency of 1976–1982, the civil uprising phase of the Syrian Civil War which started in March 2011 began as a secular and nonviolent youth-led movement. Protesters, mostly formerly apolitical Syrians in their twenties and thirties, came together on a local, grassroots basis and had affiliations to older political ideologies, calling instead for the release of prisoners of conscience, guarantees of democratic freedoms, and the fall of the Assad government. In August 2011, expatriated Syrian oppositionists formed the Syrian National Council to seek international support for the uprising. The Syrian Muslim Brotherhood officially held five seats in the Syrian National Council, the main opposition umbrella outside Syria, but created a network of alliances with other SNC members, and created a controlling influence on the council's relief committee. Since the formation of the National Coalition for Syrian Revolutionary and Opposition Forces in November 2012, the Syrian National Council has taken a backseat to the Coalition, which is recognized as the external political body of oppositionists "leading" the revolution.

In 2012, Brotherhood activists created the Commission for Civilian Protection (CCP). Its website lists numerous affiliated factions, distributed across Homs, Damascus, Idlib, and elsewhere; however, most of these groups are small and generally self-identify as members of the Free Syrian Army or the Syrian Islamic Liberation Front. The Syrian Muslim Brotherhood is believed to control, through funding, one-fourth to one-third of the disparate armed rebel brigades known collectively as the Free Syrian Army (FSA).

Despite that, The Daily Telegraph reported in August 2012 that the Muslim Brotherhood had established its own militia not affiliated to the FSA inside Syria, called "Armed Men of the Muslim Brotherhood", with presence in Damascus and other places like Homs or Idlib. Durou al-Thawra Commission (Shields of the Revolution Council) created in 2012 with assistance from the Syrian Muslim Brotherhood allegedly consisting of some 43 fighting units most of them in Idlib or Hama.

At the same time Brotherhood leaders have been reaching out to reassure leaders in neighboring Jordan, Iraq and Lebanon – as well as the West – that they "have no intention of dominating a future Syrian political system" and have "played down" their "growing influence" in the Syrian opposition. The Syrian MB has assured outsiders that it is "going to great lengths to ensure" that its donated weapons "don't fall into the hands of extremists".

According to Hassan Hassan writing in The Guardian newspaper in mid-2012, while the Brotherhood did come to dominate the Syrian National Council, a body formed outside Syria, the Brotherhood appears to be more popular among exiles than in the uprising population inside Syria. "Activists from various parts of Syria have told me that, prior to the uprising last year, the country had almost zero Brotherhood presence." "At least 70%" of Syria's population – non-Sunnis (Muslim and Christian), Kurds, and tribal groups "have been outside" the Brotherhood's influence "in the past", and Hassan believes will remain so in the future.

The Syrian Brotherhood harshly condemned Iranian political intervention in Bahrain. This condemnation was formulated "politely," without any obvious insulting references to Shi'a. However, the effort failed. The Syrian Muslim Brotherhood issued a statement declaring Jihad against Russia obligatory (Fard 'ayn) upon all who are able to carry weapons after the Russian military intervention in Syria. They reiterated the Russian Orthodox Church's call of the operation as a Holy War.

On December 5, 2024, the Muslim Brotherhood celebrated the liberation of Aleppo and Idlib as "clear triumphs" granted "by the grace and mercy of God," and were celebrated as turning points in reclaiming Syrian sovereignty. In the same statement, the Brotherhood urged discipline, unity, and solidarity among Syrians.

In December 2024, the Assad regime collapsed following a swift two-week insurgency led by Hayat Tahrir al-Sham (HTS). The fall of Assad's regime left Syria grappling with the monumental task of rebuilding from over half a century of dictatorship and civil war. Citizens began cautiously expressing hope amidst the fragility of post-conflict life, even as cycles of vengeance and sectarian violence threatened stability. The pervasive legacy of Assad's informant state left Syria fractured by betrayals, as communities grappled with the trauma of neighbors and families turning against one another. The new government, led by Ahmed al-Sharaa, called for national reconciliation and established voluntary demobilization centers, but tensions remained unresolved. In the aftermath, new security forces conducted sweeps in cities like Homs, searching for members of militias and soldiers loyal to the ousted president Bashar Assad who refused to surrender their arms. More than 100 people were detained in these operations, led by HTS in coordination with the interim Ministry of Interior. Weapons were seized, and documents linked to the Baath party were destroyed.

=== Reintegration (2025–present) ===
Following the regime's fall, a caretaker government headed by Mohammed Al-Bashir was recognized. The Muslim Brotherhood pledged support for rebuilding state institutions and proposed adopting the 1950 Syrian Constitution on an interim basis to avoid a constitutional vacuum. They also called for the formation of a constituent assembly to draft a new constitution reflecting the aspirations of the Syrian people. Among the key proposals were the establishment of ministries for the affairs of the missing, martyrs’ families, and war victims, tracking and reclaiming smuggled and stolen public funds, reforming security agencies and restructuring the armed forces, abolishing exceptional laws and military trials of civilians, and holding fair trials for individuals responsible for wartime atrocities.

== Personalities ==
- Mohammad Walid – current Brotherhood leader
- Mohammad Farouk Tayfour – deputy leader, vice president of the Syrian National Council
- Mohammad Hatem al-Tabshi – current head of Shura Council
- Molham al-Droubi – member of the Brotherhood's leadership and sits on the Syrian National Council's foreign affairs committee.
- Muhammad Surur – former member, died in 2016
- Mohammad Riad al-Shaqfeh – former Brotherhood leader

=== General leaders ===
Supreme guides or General leaders (G.L.) of the Muslim Brotherhood in Syria have been:

- Founder & first General leader (1945–1961): Mustafa al-Siba'i مُصطَفى السِّبَاعِي
- 2nd G.L. (1961–1973): Issam al-Attar عصام العطار
- 3rd G.L. (1973–1976): Abd al-Fattah Abu Ghudda عبد الفتاح أبو غدة
- 4th G.L. (1976–1981): Adnan Saad al-Din عدنان سعد الدين
- 5th G.L. (1981–1985): Hassan Howeidi حسن هويدي
- 6th G.L. (1985–1985): Munir Ghadban منير الغضبان
- 7th G.L. (1985–1986): Adib Gaja أديب الجاجي
- 8th G.L. (1986–1991): Abd al-Fattah Abu Ghudda عبد الفتاح أبو غدة
- 9th G.L. (1991–1996): Hassan Howeidi حسن هويدي
- 10th G.L. (1996–2010): Ali Sadreddine Al-Bayanouni علي صدر الدين البيانوني
- 11th G.L. (2010–2014): Mohammad Riad al-Shaqfeh محمد رياض خالد الشقفة
- 12th G.L. & current leader (2014–present): Mohammad Walid محمد حكمت وليد

== Electoral history ==
=== Constituent Assembly / Chamber of Deputies ===
Election	Seats	+/–	Position
1947	0 / 130		
1949	4 / 114	▲4	▲3rd
1953	0 / 83	▼0	Boycotted
1954	0 / 140	▼0	Boycotted

=== Constituent and Parliamentary Assembly ===
Election	Seats	+/–	Position
1961	10 / 172	▲10	▲4th

=== People's Assembly ===
Election	Seats	+/–	Position
2025–26	25 / 210	▲25	▲1st

== See also ==
- List of Islamic political parties
- Category:Muslim Brotherhood of Syria politicians
- Belligerents in the Syrian civil war
- Muslim Brotherhood in Turkey
