= Fifth Khalid al-Azm government =

1962–1963 Syrian government

- 65th government of the Syrian Arab Republic

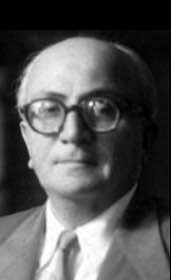
- Date formed: 17 September 1962
- Date dissolved: 8 March 1963

People and organisations
- President: Nazim al-Qudsi
- Prime Minister: Khalid al-Azm
- Prime Minister's history: K. al-Azm I K. al-Azm II; K. al-Azm III; K. al-Azm IV
- Deputy Prime Minister: Bashir al-Azma (until Feb 1963); Asaad al-Kurani (from Feb 1963)
- No. of ministers: 20 (until Feb 1963); 9 (from Feb 1963)
- Member parties: ▌People's Party; ▌National Party; ▌Ba'ath Party; ▌Muslim Brotherhood; ▌Independent
- Opposition parties: ▌Arab Liberation

History
- Outgoing formation: 1963 coup d'état
- Legislature term: Constituent and Parliamentary Assembly
- Predecessor: al-Azma
- Successor: al-Bitar I

The Fifth Khalid al-Azm government was the sixty-fifth government in the history of modern Syria. Formed on 17 September 1962 by Decree No. 2725, it was headed by Khalid al-Azm and served during the final months of the parliamentary period of the Second Syrian Republic before the 1963 Syrian coup d'état.

The government was established during a period of continued political instability following Syria's secession from the United Arab Republic. Like previous transitional administrations, it operated under significant military influence. Article 2 of the decree establishing the cabinet granted the Commander-in-Chief of the Army and Armed Forces, Major General Abd al-Karim Zahreddine, the powers and responsibilities of the Minister of Defence.

The cabinet remained in office until it was overthrown by a coup on 8 March 1963, which brought the Arab Socialist Ba'ath Party to power and marked the end of the parliamentary political order of Syria.

== Composition ==
Portfolio	Minister	Took office	Left office	Party
Prime Minister	Khalid al-Azm	17 September 1962	8 March 1963	Independent
Deputy Prime Minister	Bashir al-Azma	17 September 1962	16 February 1963	Independent
Deputy Prime Minister	Asaad al-Kurani	16 February 1963	8 March 1963	National Party
Minister of Education	Rashad Barmada	16 April 1962	16 February 1963	People's Party
Minister of Education	Aziz Abdul-Karim	16 February 1963	8 March 1963	Independent
Minister of Justice	Asaad al-Kurani	17 September 1962	8 March 1963	National Party
Minister of Endowments	Asaad al-Kurani	17 September 1962	8 March 1963	National Party
Minister of Municipal and Rural Affairs	Farhan al-Jandali	17 September 1962	8 March 1963	People's Party
Minister of Foreign Affairs	Asaad Mahasen	17 September 1962	8 March 1963	Independent
Minister of Finance	Khalil al-Kallas	17 September 1962	16 February 1963	Ba'ath Party
Minister of Finance	Izzat al-Tarabulsi	16 February 1963	8 March 1963	Independent
Minister of Agrarian Reform	Amin al-Nufuri	17 September 1962	16 February 1963	Independent
Minister of Agrarian Reform	Subhi Kahalah	16 February 1963	8 March 1963	Independent
Minister of Industry	George al-Khoury	17 September 1962	8 March 1963	
Minister of Transportation	Subhi Kahalah	16 April 1962	8 March 1963	Independent
Minister of Information	Abd al-Halim Qaddur	17 September 1962	16 February 1963	Ba'ath Party
Minister of Information	Asaad al-Kurani	16 February 1963	8 March 1963	National Party
Minister of Public Works	Robert Ilyas	16 April 1962	8 March 1963	
Minister of Interior	Aziz Abdul-Karim	20 June 1962	8 March 1963	Independent
Minister of Culture and National Guidance	Rafiq Bashour	17 September 1962	8 March 1963	People's Party
Minister of Agriculture	Ahmad al-Azma	17 September 1962	8 March 1963	
Minister of Economy	Izzat al-Tarabulsi	17 September 1962	8 March 1963	Independent
Minister of Social Affairs and Labor	Mansur al-Atrash	17 September 1962	16 February 1963	Ba'ath Party
Minister of Social Affairs and Labor	George al-Khoury	16 February 1963	8 March 1963	
Minister of Planning	Nihad Ibrahim	17 September 1962	8 March 1963	People's Party
Minister of Supply	Omar al-Khatib	17 September 1962	16 February 1963	Muslim Brotherhood
Minister of Supply	Ahmad al-Azma	16 February 1963	8 March 1963	
Minister of Health and Ambulance	Nabil al-Tawil	17 September 1962	8 March 1963	Muslim Brotherhood

Major General Abd al-Karim Zahreddine, Commander-in-Chief of the Army and Armed Forces, assumed the responsibilities and powers of the Minister of Defense.

== See also ==
- Council of Ministers (Syria)
- List of Syrian governments
- Government ministries of Syria
- List of prime ministers of Syria
