= First Amin al-Hafiz Government =

1963–1964 Syrian government

First Amin al-Hafiz government
- 69th government of the Syrian Arab Republic

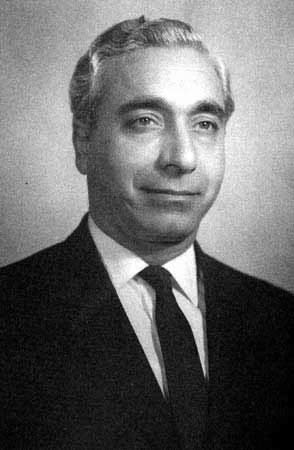
- Date formed: 12 November 1963
- Date dissolved: 14 May 1964

People and organisations
- President of the NCRC: Amin al-Hafiz
- Prime Minister: Amin al-Hafiz
- Deputy Prime Minister: Muhammad Umran
- No. of ministers: 24
- Member party: ▌Ba'ath Party

History
- Legislature term: –
- Predecessor: al-Bitar III
- Successor: al-Bitar IV

The First Amin al-Hafiz government ruled Syria from November 1963 to May 1964. The Council of Ministers was led by then-Prime Minister Amin al-Hafiz. It was formed on 12 November 1963 by Decree No. 1424 issued by the NCRC and dissolved on 13 May 1964.

== Composition ==
Portfolio	Minister	Took office	Left office
Prime Minister	Amin al-Hafiz	9 March 1963	14 May 1964
Deputy Prime Minister	Muhammad Umran	12 November 1963	14 May 1964
Minister of Information	Sami al-Jundi	13 May 1963	14 May 1964
Minister of Labour and Social Affairs	Mansur al-Atrash	13 May 1963	14 May 1964
Minister of Transportation	Ahmed Abu Saleh	13 May 1963	14 May 1964
Minister of Culture and National Guidance	Shibli al-Aysami	12 November 1963	14 May 1964
Minister of Planning	Ghassan Haddad	13 May 1963	14 May 1964
Minister of State	Al-Walid Talib	12 November 1963	14 May 1964
Minister of Health	Ibrahim Makhous	12 November 1963	14 May 1964
Minister of Finance	Mustafa al-Shamaa	13 May 1963	14 May 1964
Minister of NCRC Presidential Affairs	Abd al-Khaliq al-Naqshbandi	13 May 1963	14 May 1964
Minister of Unity Affairs	Abd al-Khaliq al-Naqshbandi	4 August 1963	14 May 1964
Minister of Economy	George Tomeh	13 May 1963	14 May 1964
Minister of Agriculture	Adil Tarbin	13 May 1963	14 May 1964
Minister of Justice	Mazhar al-Anbari	4 August 1963	14 May 1964
Minister of Public Works	Nur al-Din al-Rifai	12 November 1963	14 May 1964
Minister of Municipal and Rural Affairs	Salih al-Mahamid	13 May 1963	14 May 1964
Minister of Interior	Nureddin al-Atassi	4 August 1963	14 May 1964
Minister of Supply	Muhammad Jayush	4 August 1963	14 May 1964
Minister of Defense	Abdullah Ziadeh	4 August 1963	14 May 1964
Minister of Industry	Khair al-Din Haqqi	12 November 1963	14 May 1964
Minister of Endowments	Ahmed Mahdi al-Khidr	12 November 1963	14 May 1964
Minister of Foreign Affairs	Hassan Marioud	12 November 1963	14 May 1964
Minister of Agrarian Reform	Yusuf Zuayyin	12 November 1963	14 May 1964
Minister of Education	Mustafa Haddad	12 November 1963	14 May 1964

== See also ==
- Council of Ministers (Syria)
- List of Syrian governments
- Government ministries of Syria
- List of prime ministers of Syria
