= Fifth Salah al-Din al-Bitar Government =

1966 Syrian government

Fifth Salah al-Din al-Bitar government
- 73rd government of the Syrian Arab Republic

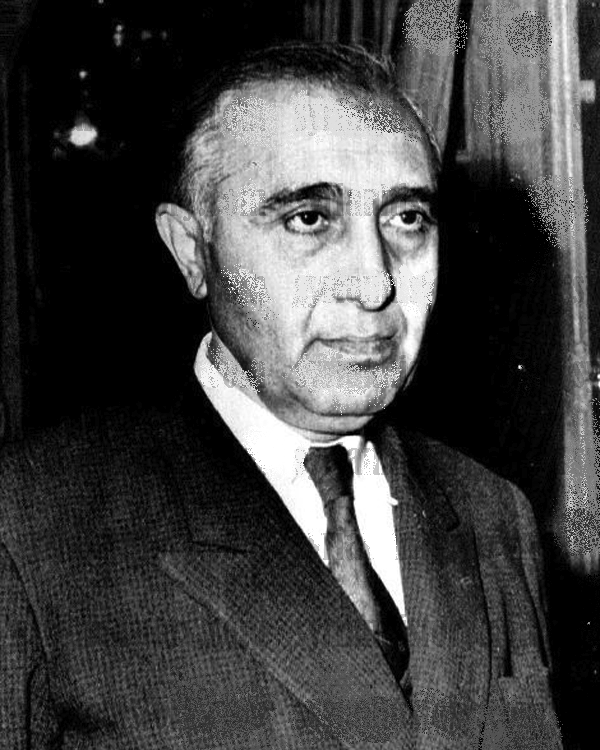
- Date formed: 1 January 1966
- Date dissolved: 23 February 1966

People and organisations
- President: Amin al-Hafiz
- Prime Minister: Salah al-Din al-Bitar
- Prime Minister's history: al-Bitar I al-Bitar II al-Bitar III al-Bitar IV
- Member party: ▌Ba'ath Party

History
- Outgoing formation: 1966 coup d'état
- Legislature term: National Revolutionary Council
- Predecessor: Zuayyin I
- Successor: Zuayyin II

The Fifth Salah al-Din al-Bitar government ruled Syria from January to February 1966. The Council of Ministers led by then-Prime Minister Salah al-Din al-Bitar.

It was formed on 1 January 1966, and abruptly dissolved on 23 February 1966 following a coup d'état. The ruling National Command of the Arab Socialist Ba'ath Party were removed from power by a union of a regionalists led by Salah Jadid.

== Composition ==
Portfolio	Minister	Took office	Left office
Prime Minister	Salah al-Din al-Bitar	1 January 1966	23 February 1966
Minister of Foreign Affairs	Salah al-Din al-Bitar	1 January 1966	23 February 1966
Minister of Defense	Muhammad Umran	1 January 1966	23 February 1966
Minister of Education	Abdullah Abd al-Dayim	1 January 1966	23 February 1966
Minister of Interior	Fahmi al-Ashouri	1 January 1966	23 February 1966
Minister of Economy	Kamal al-Hosni	1 January 1966	23 February 1966
Minister of Agriculture	Salah Wazan	1 January 1966	23 February 1966
Minister of Presidential Affairs	Mamdouh Jaber	1 January 1966	23 February 1966
Minister of Industry	Hisham al-Aas	3 October 1964	23 February 1966
Minister of Public Works	Samih al-Fakhouri	1 January 1966	23 February 1966
Minister of Municipal and Rural Affairs	Mahmud Tijar	1 January 1966	23 February 1966
Minister of Finance	Muwaffaq al-Sharbaji	1 January 1966	23 February 1966
Minister of State for Governance and Tourism	Yusuf Khabbaz	1 January 1966	23 February 1966
Minister of Health	Hanin Sayyaj	1 January 1966	23 February 1966
Minister of Information	Shakir Mustafa	1 January 1966	23 February 1966
Minister of Justice	Muhammad al-Fadel	1 January 1966	23 February 1966
Minister of Transportation	Ahmad Badreddin	1 January 1966	23 February 1966
Minister of Social Affairs and Labor	Jamil Thabit	1 January 1966	23 February 1966
Minister of Agrarian Reform	Jamil Haddad	1 January 1966	23 February 1966
Minister of Planning	Abdul-Wahhab Khayyata	1 January 1966	23 February 1966
Minister of State for Foreign Affairs	Bashir Qutb	1 January 1966	23 February 1966
Minister of Supply	Kamal Shahada	1 January 1966	23 February 1966
Minister of State for Jazira and Euphrates Affairs	Nazal Deiri	1 January 1966	23 February 1966
Minister of Culture and National Guidance	Asaad Darqawi	1 January 1966	23 February 1966
Minister of State for Endowments	Mahmoud Arab Said	1 January 1966	23 February 1966

== See also ==
- Council of Ministers (Syria)
- List of Syrian governments
- Government ministries of Syria
- List of prime ministers of Syria
