= Second Yusuf Zuayyin government =

1966–1968 Syrian government

- 74th government of the Syrian Arab Republic

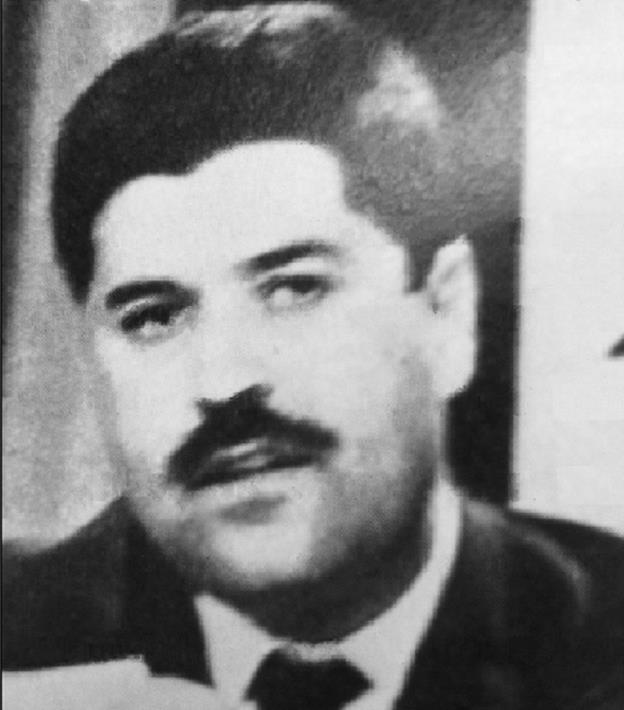
- Date formed: 1 March 1966
- Date dissolved: 28 October 1968

People and organisations
- President: Nureddin al-Atassi
- Prime Minister: Yusuf Zuayyin
- Deputy Prime Minister: Ibrahim Makhous
- No. of ministers: 19
- Member party: ▌Ba'ath Party

History
- Incoming formation: 1966 coup d'état
- Legislature term: –
- Predecessor: al-Bitar V
- Successor: N. al-Atassi

The Second Yusuf Zuayyin government was the seventy-fourth government since the establishment of the modern Syrian state in 1918 and the ninth government formed following the Ba'athist coup in March 1963 in 1961. Established on 1 March 1966 by Decree No. 1, it was headed by Yusuf Zuayyin and took office following the 1966 Syrian coup d'état, which consolidated the left-wing faction of the Arab Socialist Ba'ath Party.

The government was responsible for implementing the policies of the new Ba'athist leadership and remained in office until 28 October 1968. Article 2 of the decree establishing the government assigned the powers and responsibilities of the Minister of Defence to Major General Hafez al-Assad, then Commander of the Air Force, in addition to his existing military duties, underscoring his growing influence within the Syrian state.

During its tenure, the government continued the programme of socialist reform and administrative reorganisation. In 1967, the Ministry of Public Works was renamed the Ministry of Public Works and Water Resources by Decree No. 11.

== Composition ==
Portfolio	Minister	Took office	Left office
Prime Minister	Yusuf Zuayyin	1 March 1966	28 October 1968
Deputy Prime Minister	Ibrahim Makhous	1 March 1966	28 October 1968
Minister of Foreign Affairs	Ibrahim Makhous	1 March 1966	28 October 1968
Minister of Information	Jamil Shiya	1 March 1966	16 October 1966
Minister of Information	Muhammad al-Zoubi	16 October 1966	28 September 1967
Minister of Information	Habib Haddad	28 September 1967	28 October 1968
Minister of Culture, National Guidance and Tourism	Jamil Shiya (acting)	1 March 1966	16 October 1966
Minister of Culture, National Guidance and Tourism	Muhammad al-Zoubi (acting)	16 October 1966	28 September 1967
Minister of Culture, National Guidance and Tourism	Suhail al-Ghazzi	28 September 1967	28 October 1968
Minister of Municipal and Rural Affairs	Salih al-Mahamid	1 March 1966	28 September 1967
Minister of Municipal and Rural Affairs	Fayez Ismail	28 September 1967	28 October 1968
Minister of Education	Mustafa Haddad	1 March 1966	16 October 1966
Minister of Education	Suleiman al-Khash	16 October 1966	28 October 1968
Minister of Public Works and Water Resources	Mamdouh Jaber	1 March 1966	28 October 1968
Minister of Agriculture and Agrarian Reform	Abdul-Karim al-Jundi	1 March 1966	16 October 1966
Minister of Agriculture and Agrarian Reform	Fayez al-Jasim	16 October 1966	28 October 1968
Minister of Supply	Mashhour Zeitoun	1 March 1966	28 September 1967
Minister of Supply	Muhammad Talab Hilal	28 September 1967	28 October 1968
Minister of Interior	Muhammad Eid Aishawi	1 March 1966	28 October 1968
Minister of Finance	Muwaffaq al-Sharbaji	1 January 1966	28 October 1968
Minister of Justice	Abd al-Salam Haidar	1 March 1966	28 September 1967
Minister of Justice	Ihsan al-Sebenati	28 September 1967	28 October 1968
Minister of Endowments	Ghalib Abdoun	1 March 1966	28 October 1968
Minister of State for Planning Affairs	Abd al-Hamid al-Hassan	1 March 1966	28 September 1967
Minister of State for Planning Affairs	Hammoud al-Qabbani	28 September 1967	28 October 1968
Minister of Transportation	Samih Atiya	1 March 1966	28 October 1968
Minister of Health	Abdul Rahman al-Akta'	1 March 1966	28 September 1967
Minister of Health	Zakariya Khayyata	28 September 1967	28 October 1968
Minister of Social Affairs and Labor	Muhammad Rabah al-Tawil	1 March 1966	28 October 1968
Minister of Economy and Foreign Trade	Ahmad Murad	1 March 1966	28 September 1967
Minister of Economy and Foreign Trade	Zuhair al-Khani	28 September 1967	28 October 1968
Minister of Industry	Asaad Taqla	1 March 1966	16 October 1966
Minister of Industry	Adnan Azzouz	16 October 1966	28 October 1968
Minister of Oil, Electricity and Industrial Projects Implementation	Asaad Taqla	1 March 1966	28 September 1967
Minister of Oil, Electricity and Industrial Projects Implementation	Ahmad al-Hassan	28 September 1967	28 October 1968
Minister of Higher Education	Abdullah Wathiq Shahid	1 March 1966	28 September 1967
Minister of Higher Education	Mustafa al-Sayed	28 September 1967	28 October 1968
Minister of State	Fathallah Alloush	16 October 1966	28 October 1968
Minister of State for Council of Ministers Affairs	Zuhair al-Khani	16 October 1966	28 October 1968

Major General Hafez al-Assad, Commander of the Air Force, was tasked with the duties and powers of the Minister of Defense in addition to his regular duties.

== See also ==
- Council of Ministers (Syria)
- List of Syrian governments
- Government ministries of Syria
- List of prime ministers of Syria
