= Second Salah al-Din al-Bitar Government =

1963 Syrian government

Second Salah al-Din al-Bitar government
- 67th government of the Syrian Arab Republic

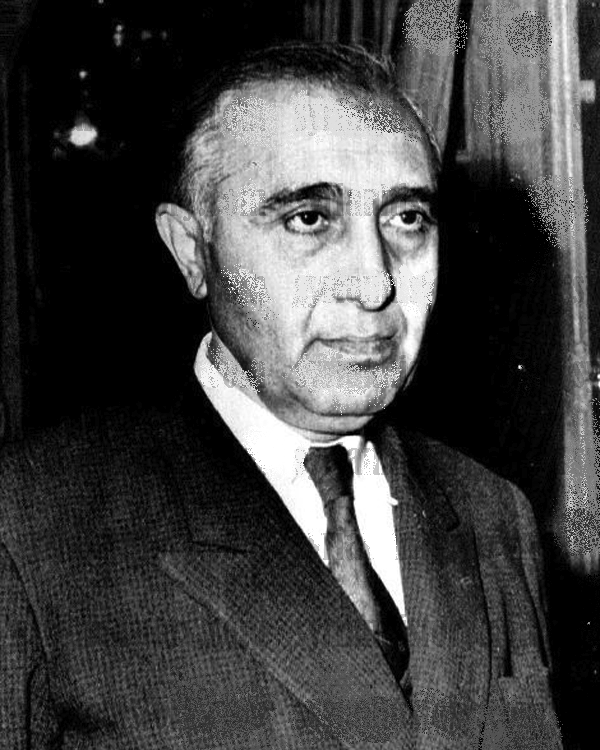
- Date formed: 13 May 1963
- Date dissolved: 4 August 1963

People and organisations
- President of the NCRC: Lu'ay al-Atassi (until 27 July); Amin al-Hafiz (from 27 July)
- Prime Minister: Salah al-Din al-Bitar
- Prime Minister's history: al-Bitar I
- Deputy Prime Minister: Amin al-Hafiz
- No. of ministers: 15
- Member party: ▌Ba'ath Party

History
- Legislature term: –
- Predecessor: al-Bitar I
- Successor: al-Bitar III

The Second Salah al-Din al-Bitar government ruled Syria from May to August 1963. The Council of Ministers was led by then-Prime Minister Salah al-Din al-Bitar.

It was formed on 13 May 1963, by Decree No. 304 issued by the NCRC and dissolved by Decree No. 780 on August 4, 1963. Bitar's second cabinet was composed largely of Ba'athists and independents, however, six ministerial portfolios were left vacant for a possible reconciliation with the Nasserites.

== Composition ==
Portfolio	Minister	Took office	Left office
Prime Minister	Salah al-Din al-Bitar	9 March 1963	4 August 1963
Minister of Foreign Affairs	Salah al-Din al-Bitar (acting)	9 March 1963	4 August 1963
Deputy Prime Minister	Amin al-Hafiz	13 May 1963	4 August 1963
Minister of Interior	Amin al-Hafiz	9 March 1963	4 August 1963
Minister of Information	Sami al-Jundi	13 May 1963	4 August 1963
Minister of Culture and National Guidance	Sami al-Jundi (acting)	9 March 1963	4 August 1963
Minister of Labour and Social Affairs	Mansur al-Atrash	13 May 1963	4 August 1963
Minister of Industry	Mansur al-Atrash (acting)	9 March 1963	4 August 1963
Minister of Municipal and Rural Affairs	Al-Walid Talib	9 March 1963	4 August 1963
Minister of Transportation	Ahmed Abu Saleh	13 May 1963	4 August 1963
Minister of Public Works	Ahmed Abu Saleh (acting)	9 March 1963	4 August 1963
Minister of Finance	Mustafa al-Shamaa	13 May 1963	4 August 1963
Minister of Education	Shibli al-Aysami	13 May 1963	4 August 1963
Minister of Agrarian Reform	Shibli al-Aysami (acting)	9 March 1963	4 August 1963
Minister of Endowments	Abdul Rahman al-Tabbaa	13 May 1963	4 August 1963
Minister of State for NCRC Presidential Affairs	Abd al-Khaliq al-Naqshbandi	13 May 1963	4 August 1963
Minister of Justice	Mazhar al-Sharbaji	13 May 1963	4 August 1963
Minister of State for Unity Affairs	Mazhar al-Sharbaji (acting)	13 May 1963	4 August 1963
Minister of Planning	Ghassan Haddad	13 May 1963	4 August 1963
Minister of Economy	George Tomeh	13 May 1963	4 August 1963
Minister of Agriculture	Adil Tarbin	13 May 1963	4 August 1963
Minister of Supply	Adil Tarbin (acting)	13 May 1963	4 August 1963
Minister of Health	Abd al-Razzaq al-Shaqqi	13 May 1963	4 August 1963

Major General Ziad al-Hariri, Chief of the General Staff of the Army and Armed Forces, was assigned the duties of the Minister of Defense in addition to his current role.

== See also ==
- Council of Ministers (Syria)
- List of Syrian governments
- Government ministries of Syria
- List of prime ministers of Syria
