= Third Salah al-Din al-Bitar Government =

1963 Syrian government

Third Salah al-Din al-Bitar government
- 68th government of the Syrian Arab Republic

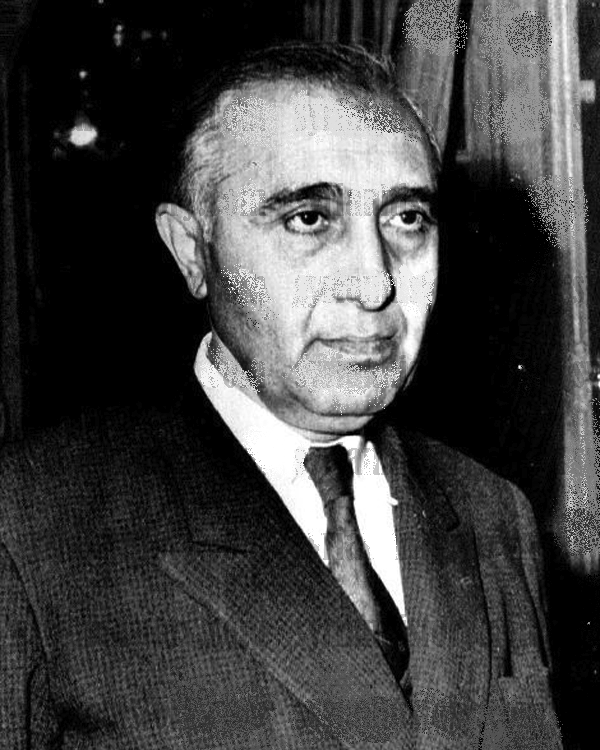
- Date formed: 4 August 1963
- Date dissolved: 12 November 1963

People and organisations
- President of the NCRC: Amin al-Hafiz
- Prime Minister: Salah al-Din al-Bitar
- Prime Minister's history: al-Bitar I al-Bitar II
- No. of ministers: 17
- Member party: ▌Ba'ath Party

History
- Legislature term: –
- Predecessor: al-Bitar II
- Successor: al-Hafiz I

The Third Salah al-Din al-Bitar government ruled Syria from May to October 1964. The Council of Ministers led by then-Prime Minister Salah al-Din al-Bitar.

It was formed on 4 August 1963, by Decree No. 781 issued by the NCRC and dissolved on 11 November 1963, The government was composed of Ba'athists and unionist independents. Bitar's third government was the first in Syria's history which the Ba'athists controlled the government.

== Composition ==
Portfolio	Minister	Took office	Left office
Prime Minister	Salah al-Din al-Bitar	9 March 1963	12 November 1963
Minister of Foreign Affairs	Salah al-Din al-Bitar	9 March 1963	12 November 1963
Minister of Information	Sami al-Jundi	13 May 1963	12 November 1963
Minister of Culture and National Guidance	Sami al-Jundi	9 March 1963	12 November 1963
Minister of Labour and Social Affairs	Mansur al-Atrash	13 May 1963	12 November 1963
Minister of Transportation	Ahmed Abu Saleh	13 May 1963	12 November 1963
Minister of Public Works	Ahmed Abu Saleh (acting)	9 March 1963	12 November 1963
Minister of Agrarian Reform	Shibli al-Aysami	9 March 1963	12 November 1963
Minister of Planning	Ghassan Haddad	13 May 1963	12 November 1963
Minister of Health	Ibrahim Makhous	4 August 1963	12 November 1963
Minister of Finance	Mustafa al-Shamaa	13 May 1963	12 November 1963
Minister of NCRC Presidential Affairs	Abd al-Khaliq al-Naqshbandi	13 May 1963	12 November 1963
Minister of Unity Affairs	Abd al-Khaliq al-Naqshbandi	4 August 1963	12 November 1963
Minister of Economy	George Tomeh	13 May 1963	12 November 1963
Minister of Agriculture	Adil Tarbin	13 May 1963	12 November 1963
Minister of Education	Shakir al-Fahham	4 August 1963	12 November 1963
Minister of Justice	Mazhar al-Anbari	4 August 1963	12 November 1963
Minister of Endowments	Mazhar al-Anbari (acting)	4 August 1963	12 November 1963
Minister of Industry	Nur al-Din al-Rifai	4 August 1963	12 November 1963
Minister of Municipal and Rural Affairs	Salih al-Mahamid	4 August 1963	12 November 1963
Minister of Interior	Nureddin al-Atassi	4 August 1963	12 November 1963
Minister of Supply	Muhammad Jayush	4 August 1963	12 November 1963

Brigadier General Abdullah Ziadeh was assigned the duties of the Minister of Defense in addition to his current role.

== See also ==
- Council of Ministers (Syria)
- List of Syrian governments
- Government ministries of Syria
- List of prime ministers of Syria
