= First Yusuf Zuayyin Government =

1965 Syrian government

First Yusuf Zuayyin government
- 72nd government of the Syrian Arab Republic

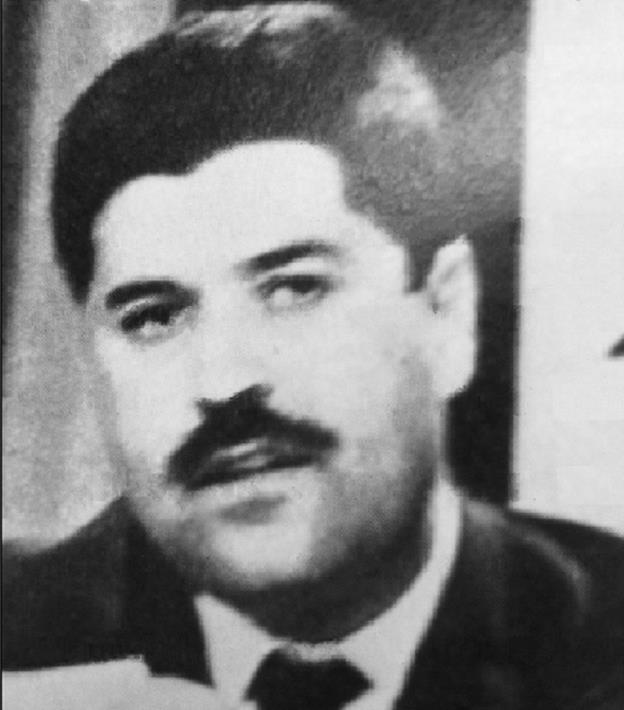
- Date formed: 23 September 1965
- Date dissolved: 27 December 1965

People and organisations
- President: Amin al-Hafiz
- Prime Minister: Yusuf Zuayyin
- Deputy Prime Minister: Ibrahim Makhous; Abd al-Fattah al-Bushi
- No. of ministers: 22
- Member party: ▌Ba'ath Party

History
- Legislature term: National Revolutionary Council
- Predecessor: al-Hafiz II
- Successor: al-Bitar V

The First Yusuf Zuayyin government ruled Syria from September 1965 to December 1965. The Council of Ministers led by then-Prime Minister Yusuf Zuayyin. It was formed on 23 September 1965 by Decree No. 2128 and dissolved on 27 December 1965 by Decree No. 2836.

== Composition ==
Portfolio	Minister	Took office	Left office
Prime Minister	Yusuf Zuayyin	23 September 1965	27 December 1965
Deputy Prime Minister	Ibrahim Makhous	23 September 1965	27 December 1965
Deputy Prime Minister	Abd al-Fattah al-Bushi	23 September 1965	27 December 1965
Minister of Foreign Affairs	Ibrahim Makhous	23 September 1965	27 December 1965
Minister of Finance	Abd al-Fattah al-Bushi	3 October 1964	27 December 1965
Minister of Presidential Affairs	Al-Walid Talib	3 October 1964	27 December 1965
Minister of Agriculture	Adil Tarbin	4 August 1963	27 December 1965
Minister of Municipal and Rural Affairs	Salih al-Mahamid	3 October 1964	27 December 1965
Minister of Education	Mustafa Haddad	12 November 1963	27 December 1965
Minister of Endowments	Abd al-Rahman al-Kawakibi	14 May 1964	27 December 1965
Minister of Public Works	Mamdouh Jaber	23 September 1965	27 December 1965
Minister of Labor and Social Affairs	Ali Taljbini	3 October 1964	27 December 1965
Minister of Economy	Ibrahim al-Bitar	3 October 1964	27 December 1965
Minister of Information	Suleiman al-Khash	23 September 1965	27 December 1965
Minister of Culture and National Guidance	Suleiman al-Khash (acting)	3 October 1964	27 December 1965
Minister of Justice	Hussein Muhanna	3 October 1964	27 December 1965
Minister of Agrarian Reform	Abdul-Karim al-Jundi	3 October 1964	27 December 1965
Minister of Supply	Mashhour Zeitoun	23 September 1965	27 December 1965
Minister of Transportation	Samih al-Fakhouri	3 October 1964	27 December 1965
Minister of Industry	Hisham al-Aas	3 October 1964	27 December 1965
Minister of Planning	Muhammad Kheir Badawi	23 September 1965	27 December 1965
Minister of Defense	Hamad Ubeyd	23 September 1965	27 December 1965
Minister of Health	Sadiq Faroun	23 September 1965	27 December 1965
Minister of Interior	Muhammad Eid Aishawi	23 September 1965	27 December 1965

== See also ==
- Council of Ministers (Syria)
- List of Syrian governments
- Government ministries of Syria
- List of prime ministers of Syria
