= Second Amin al-Hafiz Government =

1964–1965 Syrian government

Second Amin al-Hafiz government
- 71st government of the Syrian Arab Republic

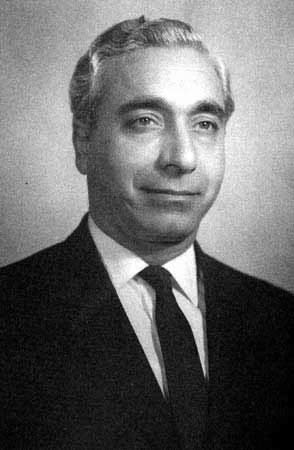
- Date formed: 3 October 1964
- Date dissolved: 23 September 1965

People and organisations
- President: Amin al-Hafiz
- Prime Minister: Amin al-Hafiz
- Prime Minister's history: al-Hafiz I
- Deputy Prime Minister: Nureddin al-Atassi
- No. of ministers: 22
- Member party: ▌Ba'ath Party

History
- Legislature terms: National Revolutionary Council (from 1 September)
- Predecessor: al-Bitar IV
- Successor: Zuayyin I

The Second Amin al-Hafiz government ruled Syria from October 1964 to September 1965. The Council of Ministers led by then-President and Prime Minister Amin al-Hafiz. It was formed on 4 October 1964 by Decree No. 905 and dissolved on 22 September 1965 by Decree No. 2127.

== Composition ==
Portfolio	Minister	Took office	Left office
Prime Minister	Amin al-Hafiz	3 October 1964	23 September 1965
Deputy Prime Minister	Nureddin al-Atassi	3 October 1964	23 September 1965
Minister of Planning	Ghassan Haddad	13 May 1963	23 September 1965
Minister of Presidential Affairs	Al-Walid Talib	3 October 1964	23 September 1965
Minister of Agriculture	Adil Tarbin	4 August 1963	23 September 1965
Minister of Municipal and Rural Affairs	Salih al-Mahamid	3 October 1964	23 September 1965
Minister of Foreign Affairs	Hassan Marioud	12 November 1963	23 September 1965
Minister of Education	Mustafa Haddad	12 November 1963	23 September 1965
Minister of Endowments	Abd al-Rahman al-Kawakibi	14 May 1964	23 September 1965
Minister of Defense	Mamdouh Jaber	14 May 1964	23 September 1965
Minister of Finance	Abd al-Fattah al-Bushi	3 October 1964	23 September 1965
Minister of Labor and Social Affairs	Ali Taljbini	3 October 1964	23 September 1965
Minister of Economy	Ibrahim al-Bitar	3 October 1964	23 September 1965
Minister of Culture and National Guidance	Suleiman al-Khash	3 October 1964	23 September 1965
Minister of Justice	Hussein Muhanna	3 October 1964	23 September 1965
Minister of Agrarian Reform	Abdul-Karim al-Jundi	3 October 1964	23 September 1965
Minister of Interior	Abdul-Karim al-Jundi (acting)	3 October 1964	23 September 1965
Minister of Supply	Jamil Shiya	3 October 1964	23 September 1965
Minister of Health	Mustafa Izzat Nassar	3 October 1964	23 September 1965
Minister of Information	Mashhour Zeitoun	3 October 1964	23 September 1965
Minister of Transportation	Samih al-Fakhouri	3 October 1964	23 September 1965
Minister of Public Works	Mahmoud Tejar	3 October 1964	23 September 1965
Minister of Industry	Hisham al-Aas	3 October 1964	23 September 1965

== See also ==
- Council of Ministers (Syria)
- List of Syrian governments
- Government ministries of Syria
- List of prime ministers of Syria
