= Fourth Salah al-Din al-Bitar Government =

1964 Syrian government

Fourth Salah al-Din al-Bitar government
- 70th government of the Syrian Arab Republic

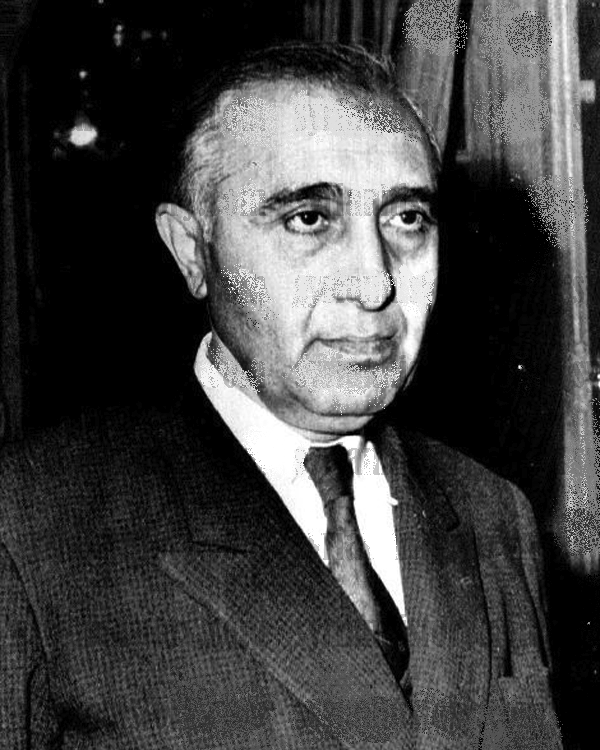
- Date formed: 14 May 1964
- Date dissolved: 3 October 1964

People and organisations
- President: Amin al-Hafiz
- Prime Minister: Salah al-Din al-Bitar
- Prime Minister's history: al-Bitar I al-Bitar II al-Bitar III
- No. of ministers: 19
- Member party: ▌Ba'ath Party

History
- Legislature term: –
- Predecessor: al-Hafiz I
- Successor: al-Hafiz II

The Fourth Salah al-Din al-Bitar government ruled Syria from May to October 1964. The Council of Ministers led by then-Prime Minister Salah al-Din al-Bitar. It was the seventieth government of Syria, and the fifth since the Ba'athist takeover.

It was formed on 14 May 1964, and dissolved on 3 October.

== Composition ==
Portfolio	Minister	Took office	Left office
Prime Minister	Salah al-Din al-Bitar	14 May 1964	3 October 1964
Minister of State	Thabit al-Aris	14 May 1964	3 October 1964
Minister of Information	Abdullah Abd al-Dayim	14 May 1964	3 October 1964
Minister of Planning	Ghassan Haddad	13 May 1963	3 October 1964
Minister of Finance	Mustafa al-Shamaa	13 May 1963	3 October 1964
Minister of Presidential Affairs	Abd al-Khaliq al-Naqshbandi	13 May 1963	3 October 1964
Minister of Unity Affairs	Abd al-Khaliq al-Naqshbandi	14 May 1964	3 October 1964
Minister of Agriculture	Adil Tarbin	4 August 1963	3 October 1964
Minister of Justice	Mazhar al-Anbari	4 August 1963	3 October 1964
Minister of Health	Mazhar al-Anbari (acting)	14 May 1964	3 October 1964
Minister of Public Works	Nur al-Din al-Rifai	12 November 1963	3 October 1964
Minister of Transportation	Nur al-Din al-Rifai (acting)	14 May 1964	3 October 1964
Minister of Foreign Affairs	Hassan Marioud	12 November 1963	3 October 1964
Minister of Education	Mustafa Haddad	12 November 1963	3 October 1964
Minister of Culture and National Guidance	Asaad Mahfel	14 May 1964	3 October 1964
Minister of Industry	Adel al-Saadi	14 May 1964	3 October 1964
Minister of Supply	Adel al-Saadi (acting)	14 May 1964	3 October 1964
Minister of Agrarian Reform	Salah Wazzan	14 May 1964	3 October 1964
Minister of Endowments	Abd al-Rahman al-Kawakibi	14 May 1964	3 October 1964
Minister of Economy	Kamal al-Hosni	14 May 1964	3 October 1964
Minister of Defense	Mamdouh Jaber	14 May 1964	3 October 1964
Minister of Labour and Social Affairs	Suleiman al-Ali	14 May 1964	3 October 1964
Minister of Municipal and Rural Affairs	Suleiman al-Ali (acting)	14 May 1964	3 October 1964
Minister of Interior	Muhammad Fahmi al-Ashuri	14 May 1964	3 October 1964

== See also ==
- Council of Ministers (Syria)
- List of Syrian governments
- Government ministries of Syria
- List of prime ministers of Syria
