= Husni al-Barazi government =

1942–1943 Syrian government

- 26th government of the Syrian Republic
- Date formed: 18 April 1942
- Date dissolved: 8 January 1943

People and organisations
- President: Taj al-Din al-Hasani
- General Delegate: Georges Catroux
- Prime Minister: Husni al-Barazi
- No. of ministers: 8 (until 1942); 9 (from 1942)
- Member parties: ▌National Bloc; ▌Independent

History
- Legislature term: –
- Predecessor: al-Hakim I
- Successor: al-Ulshi II

The Husni al-Barazi government was the twenty-sixth government in the history of modern Syria and the eleventh administration of the First Syrian Republic. Formed on 17 April 1942, it was the second government to serve under the presidency of Taj al-Din al-Hasani.

The government was generally regarded as pro-British in orientation, particularly under the leadership of Prime Minister Husni al-Barazi. Although relations between the prime minister and President Taj al-Din al-Hasani deteriorated significantly during its tenure, the cabinet remained in office for approximately three months despite the political rupture between the two men. The government ultimately fell after President al-Hasani secured British support for its dismissal. The cabinet was notable for including Munir al-Ajlani, the president's son-in-law, as a minister—the first known instance in modern Syrian history of a president's relative serving in the cabinet. Six ministers retained the portfolios they had held in the preceding government, reflecting a significant degree of continuity in the administration.

== Composition ==
| Portfolio | Minister | Took office | Left office | Party |
|---|---|---|---|---|
| Prime Minister | Husni al-Barazi | 18 April 1942 | 8 January 1943 | Independent |
| Minister of Interior | Husni al-Barazi | 18 April 1942 | 8 January 1943 | Independent |
| Minister of Education | Husni al-Barazi | 18 April 1942 | 1 July 1942 | Independent |
| Minister of Education | Khalil Mardam Bey | 1 July 1942 | 8 January 1943 | Independent |
| Minister of Finance | Fayez al-Khoury | 18 April 1942 | 8 January 1943 | National Bloc |
| Minister of Foreign Affairs | Fayez al-Khoury | 20 September 1941 | 8 January 1943 | National Bloc |
| Minister of National Economy | Muhammad al-Ayish | 20 September 1941 | 8 January 1943 | Independent |
| Minister of Public Works | Munir al-Abbas | 20 September 1941 | 8 January 1943 | Independent |
| Minister of Telegraphs and Mail | Munir al-Abbas | 18 April 1942 | 8 January 1943 | Independent |
| Minister of Provisions and Supply | Hikmat al-Hiraki | 20 September 1941 | 8 January 1943 | Independent |
| Minister of National Defense | Hasan al-Atrash | 18 April 1942 | 8 January 1943 | Independent |
| Minister of Propaganda and Youth | Munir al-Ajlani | 18 April 1942 | 8 January 1943 | National Bloc |
| Minister of Justice | Raghib al-Kihiya | 18 April 1942 | 8 January 1943 | National Bloc |

== See also ==
- Council of Ministers (Syria)
- List of Syrian governments
- Government ministries of Syria
- List of prime ministers of Syria
