= First Salah al-Din al-Bitar Government =

1963 Syrian government

- 66th government of the Syrian Arab Republic

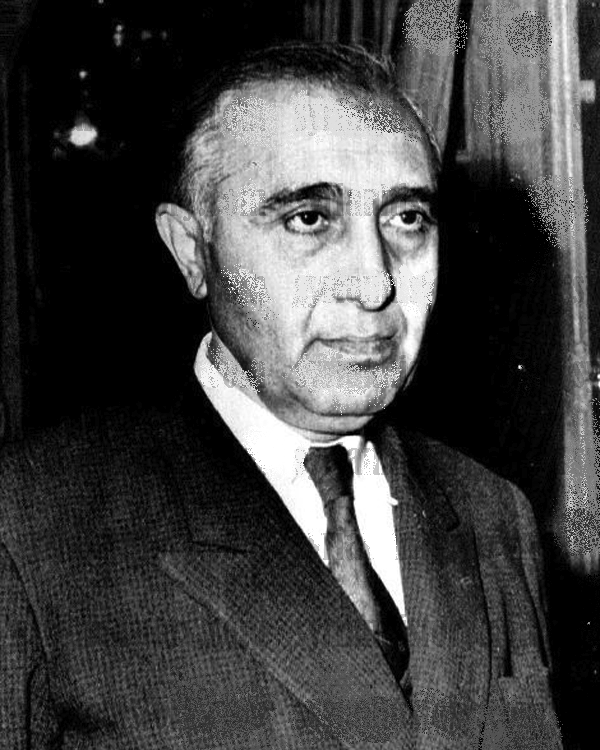
- Date formed: 9 March 1963
- Date dissolved: 11 May 1963

People and organisations
- President of the NCRC: Lu'ay al-Atassi
- Prime Minister: Salah al-Din al-Bitar
- Deputy Prime Minister: Nihad al-Qasim
- No. of ministers: 20
- Member party: ▌Ba'ath Party

History
- Incoming formation: 1963 coup d'état
- Legislature term: –
- Predecessor: K. al-Azm V
- Successor: al-Bitar II

The First Salah al-Din al-Bitar government ruled Syria from March to May 1963. The Council of Ministers was led by then-Prime Minister Salah al-Din al-Bitar. This government was the 66th since Syria gained independence from the Ottoman Empire in 1918 and the country's first Baathist government.

It was formed on 9 March by decree of the NCRC one day after the 1963 Syrian coup d'état and resigned two months later. All vital ministries except the Ministry of Defense – which was headed by independent Nasserite General Muhammad al-Sufi – were given to Ba'athists.

== Composition ==
Portfolio	Minister	Took office	Left office
Prime Minister	Salah al-Din al-Bitar	9 March 1963	11 May 1963
Minister of Foreign Affairs	Salah al-Din al-Bitar	9 March 1963	11 May 1963
Deputy Prime Minister	Nihad al-Qasim	9 March 1963	11 May 1963
Minister of Justice	Nihad al-Qasim	9 March 1963	11 May 1963
Minister of Finance	Abdul-Wahab Hawmad	9 March 1963	11 May 1963
Minister of Defense	Muhammad al-Sufi	9 March 1963	11 May 1963
Minister of Interior	Amin al-Hafiz	9 March 1963	11 May 1963
Minister of Labour and Social Affairs	Mansur al-Atrash	9 March 1963	11 May 1963
Minister of Agriculture	Abd al-Halim Sweidan	9 March 1963	11 May 1963
Minister of Education	Sami Droubi	9 March 1963	11 May 1963
Minister of Economy	Abd al-Karim Zuhur	9 March 1963	11 May 1963
Minister of Information	Jamal al-Atassi	9 March 1963	11 May 1963
Minister of State	Darwish al-Alwani	9 March 1963	11 May 1963
Minister of Endowments	Darwish al-Alwani (acting)	9 March 1963	11 May 1963
Minister of Planning	Hani al-Hindi	9 March 1963	11 May 1963
Minister of Municipal and Rural Affairs	Al-Walid Talib	9 March 1963	11 May 1963
Minister of Supply	Sami Sufan	9 March 1963	11 May 1963
Minister of Transportation	Jihad Dahi	9 March 1963	11 May 1963
Minister of Public Works	Ahmed Abu Saleh	9 March 1963	11 May 1963
Minister of Agrarian Reform	Shibli al-Aysami	9 March 1963	11 May 1963
Minister of Health	Ibrahim Makhous	9 March 1963	11 May 1963
Minister of Industry	Talib Damad	9 March 1963	11 May 1963
Minister of Culture and National Guidance	Sami al-Jundi	9 March 1963	11 May 1963

== See also ==
- Council of Ministers (Syria)
- List of Syrian governments
- Government ministries of Syria
- List of prime ministers of Syria
