= Second Hassan al-Hakim government =

1951 Syrian government

- 47th government of the Syrian Republic
- Date formed: 9 August 1951
- Date dissolved: 28 November 1951

People and organisations
- President: Hashim al-Atassi
- Prime Minister: Hassan al-Hakim
- Prime Minister's history: al-Hakim I
- No. of ministers: 9 (until 12 Aug); 10 (from 12 Aug)
- Member parties: ▌People's Party; ▌Muslim Brotherhood; ▌Independent
- Opposition parties: ▌National Party; ▌Ba'ath Party; ▌Arab Socialist Movement; ▌SSNP

History
- Legislature term: 5th Chamber of Deputies
- Predecessor: K. al-Azm IV
- Successor: al-Dawalibi I

The Second Hassan al-Hakim government was the forty-seventh government in the history of modern Syria and the third administration of the Second Syrian Republic. Formed on 9 August 1951, it was the sixth government to serve during the second presidency of Hashim al-Atassi and the second cabinet headed by Hassan al-Hakim.

The government was initially opposed by senior military leaders due to al-Hakim's perceived support for closer relations with Iraq and the People's Party. However, the military eventually accepted the government after it was formed without party-affiliated figures. Despite this compromise, the government struggled to maintain political stability and was unable to remain in power for more than two months due to disputes with parliamentary blocs.

The government's short tenure reflected the continuing tensions between civilian political forces, parliamentary groups, and the increasingly influential military establishment in Syria during the early 1950s.

== Composition ==
Portfolio	Minister	Took office	Left office	Party
Prime Minister	Hassan al-Hakim	9 August 1951	28 November 1951	Independent
Minister of Finance	Hassan al-Hakim	9 August 1951	28 November 1951	Independent
Minister of Foreign Affairs	Faydi al-Atassi	9 August 1951	28 November 1951	People's Party
Minister of Health and Ambulance	Fathallah Asyun	9 August 1951	28 November 1951	People's Party
Minister of National Economy	Shakir al-Aas	9 August 1951	28 November 1951	People's Party
Minister of Agriculture	Shakir al-Aas (acting)	9 August 1951	12 August 1951	People's Party
Minister of Agriculture	Muhammad al-Mubarak	12 August 1951	28 November 1951	Muslim Brotherhood
Minister of National Defense	Fawzi Selu	4 June 1950	28 November 1951	Independent
Minister of Interior	Rashad Barmada	9 August 1951	28 November 1951	People's Party
Minister of Public Works and Transport	Hamid al-Khoja	9 August 1951	28 November 1951	Independent
Minister of Education	Abdul-Wahhab Hawmad	9 August 1951	28 November 1951	People's Party
Minister of Justice	Abd al-Aziz Hasan	9 August 1951	28 November 1951	People's Party

== See also ==
- Council of Ministers (Syria)
- List of Syrian governments
- Government ministries of Syria
- List of prime ministers of Syria
