= Third Nazim al-Qudsi government =

1950–1951 Syrian government

- 45th government of the Syrian Republic

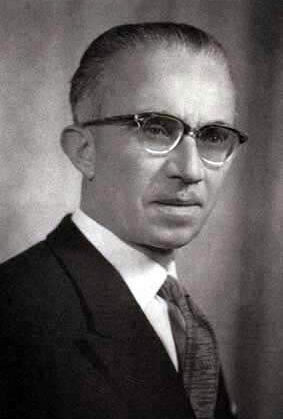
- Date formed: 8 September 1950
- Date dissolved: 27 March 1951

People and organisations
- President: Hashim al-Atassi
- Prime Minister: Nazim al-Qudsi
- Prime Minister's history: al-Qudsi I al-Qudsi II
- No. of ministers: 11
- Member parties: ▌People's Party; ▌Independent
- Opposition parties: ▌National Party; ▌Ba'ath Party; ▌Muslim Brotherhood; ▌Arab Socialist Movement; ▌SSNP

History
- Incoming formation: Constitution of 1950
- Legislature term: 5th Chamber of Deputies
- Predecessor: al-Qudsi II
- Successor: K. al-Azm IV

The Third Nazim al-Qudsi government was the forty-fifth government in the history of modern Syria and the first administration of the Second Syrian Republic. Formed on 8 September 1950, it was the fourth government to serve during the second presidency of Hashim al-Atassi and the third cabinet headed by Nazim al-Qudsi.

The government was established amid an escalating confrontation between the civilian leadership of the People's Party and influential military officers, particularly Adib Shishakli and Fawzi Selu. By this stage, tensions had reached a critical level, prompting the People's Party to declare that the dispute had become a constitutional crisis rather than merely a political disagreement.

== Composition ==
Portfolio	Minister	Took office	Left office	Party
Prime Minister	Nazim al-Qudsi	4 June 1950	27 March 1951	People's Party
Minister of Foreign Affairs	Nazim al-Qudsi	4 June 1950	27 March 1951	People's Party
Minister of State	Hassan al-Hakim	8 September 1950	27 March 1951	Independent
Minister of Justice	Zaki al-Khatib	4 June 1950	27 March 1951	Independent
Minister of Education	Hani al-Sibai	8 September 1950	27 March 1951	People's Party
Minister of Finance	Shakir al-Aas	8 September 1950	27 March 1951	People's Party
Minister of Public Works	Ahmad Qanbar	8 September 1950	27 March 1951	People's Party
Minister of Health and Ambulance	George Shalhoub	8 September 1950	27 March 1951	People's Party
Minister of National Economy	Farhan al-Jandali	8 September 1950	27 March 1951	People's Party
Minister of National Defense	Fawzi Selu	4 June 1950	27 March 1951	Independent
Minister of Interior	Rashad Barmada	4 June 1950	27 March 1951	People's Party
Minister of Agriculture	Ali Bozo	8 September 1950	27 March 1951	People's Party

== See also ==
- Council of Ministers (Syria)
- List of Syrian governments
- Government ministries of Syria
- List of prime ministers of Syria
