= Second Ata Bey al-Ayyubi government =

1943 Syrian government

- 28th government of the Syrian Republic

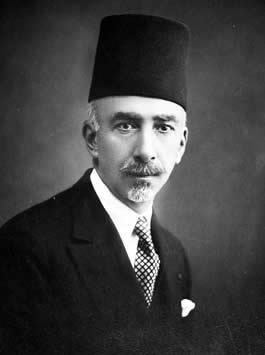
- Date formed: 25 March 1943
- Date dissolved: 19 August 1943

People and organisations
- President: Ata Bey al-Ayyubi (acting)
- General Delegate: Georges Catroux; Jean Helleu
- Prime Minister: Ata Bey al-Ayyubi
- Prime Minister's history: A. al-Ayyubi I
- No. of ministers: 4
- Member parties: ▌National Bloc; ▌Independent

History
- Legislature term: –
- Predecessor: al-Ulshi II
- Successor: al-Jabiri I

The Second Ata al-Ayyubi government was the twenty-eighth government in the history of modern Syria and the thirteenth administration of the First Syrian Republic. Formed on 25 March 1943, it served as a neutral caretaker government tasked with overseeing the parliamentary elections held later that year during a period of political transition.

Composed primarily of non-partisan figures, the government was established to ensure the administration of the electoral process following the dismissal of the previous cabinet by the French high commissioner. Its tenure culminated in the election of a new Chamber of Deputies dominated by the National Bloc, which subsequently elected Shukri al-Quwatli as president of the republic. Prime Minister Ata al-Ayyubi simultaneously held the office of acting president of Syria throughout the government's tenure, combining the functions of head of government and interim head of state until the completion of the constitutional transition.

== Composition ==
Portfolio	Minister	Took office	Left office	Party
Prime Minister	Ata Bey al-Ayyubi	25 March 1943	19 August 1943	Independent
Minister of Interior	Ata Bey al-Ayyubi	25 March 1943	19 August 1943	Independent
Minister of National Defense	Ata Bey al-Ayyubi	25 March 1943	19 August 1943	Independent
Minister of Finance	Mustafa al-Shihabi	8 January 1943	19 August 1943	Independent
Minister of National Economy	Mustafa al-Shihabi	25 March 1943	19 August 1943	Independent
Minister of Provisions and Supply	Mustafa al-Shihabi	25 March 1943	19 August 1943	Independent
Minister of Foreign Affairs	Na'im al-Antaki	25 March 1943	19 August 1943	National Bloc
Minister of Public Works	Na'im al-Antaki	25 March 1943	19 August 1943	National Bloc
Minister of Justice	Faydi al-Atassi	25 March 1943	19 August 1943	National Bloc
Minister of Education	Faydi al-Atassi	25 March 1943	19 August 1943	National Bloc
Minister of Social Affairs	Faydi al-Atassi	25 March 1943	19 August 1943	National Bloc

== See also ==
- Council of Ministers (Syria)
- List of Syrian governments
- Government ministries of Syria
- List of prime ministers of Syria
