= First Hassan al-Hakim government =

1941–1942 Syrian government

- 25th government of the Syrian Republic
- Date formed: 20 September 1941
- Date dissolved: 17 April 1942

People and organisations
- President: Taj al-Din al-Hasani
- General Delegate: Georges Catroux
- Prime Minister: Hassan al-Hakim
- No. of ministers: 9

History
- Legislature term: –
- Predecessor: K. al-Azm I
- Successor: H. al-Barazi

The First Hassan al-Hakim Government was the twenty-fifth government in the history of modern Syria and the tenth administration of the First Syrian Republic. Formed in September 1941 following the appointment of Taj al-Din al-Hasani as President of Syria, it was the first government to serve under his presidency after the restoration of constitutional rule.

The government brought together representatives of several major political currents in Syria, a coalition that contributed to its fragmentation within six months of its formation. During its tenure, Syria's independence was formally proclaimed, and a federal arrangement granting financial and administrative autonomy to the provinces of Latakia and Jabal al-Druze (Suwayda) was adopted. The government also sought to expand Syrian legislative authority by advocating for the exclusive right of Syrians to enact laws without French participation. This proposal was rejected, deepening tensions between Prime Minister Hassan al-Hakim and President Taj al-Din al-Hasani. As the dispute intensified, the president encouraged ministers to resign, leading to the resignation of a majority of cabinet members. Under constitutional provisions, the government was consequently deemed resigned, becoming the first Syrian cabinet to fall as a result of the resignation of most of its ministers.

== Composition ==
| Portfolio | Minister | Took office | Left office | Party |
|---|---|---|---|---|
| Prime Minister | Hassan al-Hakim | 20 September 1941 | 17 April 1942 | Shahbandari |
| Minister of Finance | Hassan al-Hakim | 20 September 1941 | 17 April 1942 | Shahbandari |
| Minister of Justice | Zaki al-Khatib | 20 September 1941 | 17 April 1942 | Shahbandari |
| Minister of Interior | Bahij al-Khatib (acting) | 20 September 1941 | 17 April 1942 | Moderates |
| Minister of Foreign Affairs | Fayez al-Khoury | 20 September 1941 | 17 April 1942 | National Bloc |
| Minister of Education | Faydi al-Atassi | 20 September 1941 | 17 April 1942 | National Bloc |
| Minister of National Defense | Abd al-Ghaffar al-Atrash | 20 September 1941 | 17 April 1942 | Moderates |
| Minister of National Economy | Muhammad al-Ayish | 20 September 1941 | 17 April 1942 | Moderates |
| Minister of Public Works | Munir al-Abbas | 20 September 1941 | 17 April 1942 | Moderates |
| Minister of Provisions and Supply | Hikmat al-Hiraki | 20 September 1941 | 17 April 1942 | Moderates |

== See also ==
- Council of Ministers (Syria)
- List of Syrian governments
- Government ministries of Syria
- List of prime ministers of Syria
