= Fourth Khalid al-Azm government =

1951 Syrian government

- 46th government of the Syrian Republic

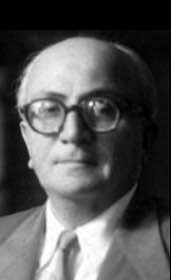
- Date formed: 27 March 1951
- Date dissolved: 9 August 1951

People and organisations
- President: Hashim al-Atassi
- Prime Minister: Khalid al-Azm
- Prime Minister's history: K. al-Azm I K. al-Azm II; K. al-Azm III
- No. of ministers: 7
- Member parties: ▌People's Party; ▌Arab Socialist Movement; ▌Independent
- Opposition parties: ▌National Party; ▌Ba'ath Party; ▌Muslim Brotherhood; ▌SSNP

History
- Legislature term: 5th Chamber of Deputies
- Predecessor: al-Qudsi III
- Successor: al-Hakim II

The Fourth Khalid al-Azm government was the forty-sixth government in the history of modern Syria and the second administration of the Second Syrian Republic. Formed on 27 March 1951, it was the fifth government to serve during the second presidency of Hashim al-Atassi and the fourth cabinet headed by Khalid al-Azm.

The government was established in the aftermath of the constitutional and political crisis that had developed between the leadership of the People's Party, which held the largest bloc in parliament, and influential military officers led by Adib Shishakli. As a result, the government lacked the full support of the People's Party and rested on a relatively fragile parliamentary coalition.

Throughout its brief tenure, the government struggled to secure stable political backing. Its position was further weakened when the Chamber of Deputies rejected the budget proposals submitted by the government. Unable to overcome the resulting parliamentary deadlock, the government resigned after approximately four months in office, reflecting the continuing instability of Syrian politics and the growing influence of the military over civilian institutions during the early 1950s.

== Composition ==
Portfolio	Minister	Took office	Left office	Party
Prime Minister	Khalid al-Azm	27 March 1951	9 August 1951	Independent
Minister of Foreign Affairs	Nazim al-Qudsi	4 June 1950	9 August 1951	People's Party
Minister of Interior	Sami Kabbarah	27 March 1951	9 August 1951	Independent
Minister of Agriculture	Abd al-Baqi Nizam ad-Din	27 March 1951	9 August 1951	People's Party
Minister of Justice	Abd al-Baqi Nizam ad-Din (acting)	27 March 1951	9 August 1951	People's Party
Minister of Finance	Abd al-Rahman al-Azm	27 March 1951	9 August 1951	Independent
Minister of National Defense	Fawzi Selu	4 June 1950	9 August 1951	Independent
Minister of Education	Raif al-Malqi	27 March 1951	9 August 1951	Independent
Minister of National Economy	Raif al-Malqi (acting)	27 March 1951	9 August 1951	Independent
Minister of Health and Ambulance	Sami Tayyarah	27 March 1951	9 August 1951	Arab Socialist Movement
Minister of Public Works and Transport	Sami Tayyarah (acting)	27 March 1951	9 August 1951	Arab Socialist Movement

== See also ==
- Council of Ministers (Syria)
- List of Syrian governments
- Government ministries of Syria
- List of prime ministers of Syria
