= Second Khalid al-Azm government =

1948–1949 Syrian government

- 38th government of the Syrian Republic

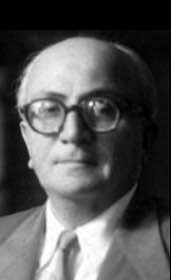
- Date formed: 16 December 1948
- Date dissolved: 29 March 1949

People and organisations
- President: Shukri al-Quwatli
- Prime Minister: Khalid al-Azm
- Prime Minister's history: K. al-Azm I
- No. of ministers: 8
- Member parties: ▌National Party; ▌Independent
- Opposition party: ▌People's Party; ▌Ba'ath Party

History
- Outgoing formation: March 1949 coup d'état
- Legislature term: 4th Chamber of Deputies
- Predecessor: Mardam Bey IV
- Successor: al-Za'im

The Second Khalid al-Azm government was the thirty-eighth government in the history of modern Syria and the twenty-third administration of the First Syrian Republic. Formed on 12 December 1948, it was the ninth government to serve under President Shukri al-Quwatli and the second cabinet headed by Khalid al-Azm. The government emerged following a twelve-day political crisis triggered by the aftermath of the 1948 Arab–Israeli War and the widespread protests that followed Syria's military defeat.

The cabinet secured the confidence of the Chamber of Deputies by a vote of 73 in favour and 35 against, with several deputies abstaining. In its ministerial statement, the government pledged to work toward the liberation of Palestine and the revival of Syria's struggling economy, which had been severely affected by the political and military crises of the preceding year. Nevertheless, contemporary observers and sections of the press regarded the program as disappointing and insufficient to address the country's mounting challenges. The government also became embroiled in controversy over the proposed Trans-Arabian Pipeline (Tapline) agreement, which generated significant political debate.

The administration's tenure coincided with the growing political influence of the Syrian military, particularly that of Army Commander Husni al-Za'im. On 30 March 1949, al-Za'im carried out Syria's first military coup d'état, arresting President al-Quwatli, Prime Minister al-Azm, and members of the cabinet, who were detained at the Mezze Military Hospital. Their resignations were subsequently published on 6 April 1949. Syria remained without a government until 17 April 1949, when Husni al-Za'im formed a new cabinet under his own leadership, bringing the era of the First Syrian Republic to an abrupt end.

== Composition ==
Portfolio	Minister	Took office	Left office	Party
Prime Minister	Khalid al-Azm	16 December 1948	29 March 1949	Independent
Minister of Foreign Affairs	Khalid al-Azm	16 December 1948	29 March 1949	Independent
Minister of National Defense	Khalid al-Azm	16 December 1948	29 March 1949	Independent
Minister of Education	Muhsin al-Barazi	16 December 1948	29 March 1949	Independent
Minister of Agriculture	Muhammad al-Ayish	23 August 1948	29 March 1949	Independent
Minister of Justice	Ahmad al-Rifai	16 December 1948	29 March 1949	Independent
Minister of Health and Social Affairs	Ahmad al-Rifai	16 December 1948	29 March 1949	Independent
Minister of National Economy	Hanin Sahnawi	16 December 1948	29 March 1949	Independent
Minister of Finance	Hasan Jabbarah	16 December 1948	29 March 1949	Independent
Minister of Interior	Adil al-Azma	16 December 1948	29 March 1949	National Party
Minister of Public Works	Majd al-Din al-Jabri	16 December 1948	29 March 1949	National Party

== See also ==
- Council of Ministers (Syria)
- List of Syrian governments
- Government ministries of Syria
- List of prime ministers of Syria
