= Maher Khalil al-Hasan =

Syrian politician

- ماهر خليل الحسن

Minister of Internal Trade and Consumer Protection
- In office December 2024 – 29 March 2025
- President: Ahmed al-Sharaa (Note: As de facto leader until 29 January 2025.)
- Prime Minister: Mohammed al-Bashir
- Preceded by: Louay Imad al-Munajjid
- Succeeded by: Nidal al-Shaar (as Minister of Economy and Industry)

Personal details
- Party: Independent

Maher Khalil al-Hasan (Note: Arabic: ماهر خليل الحسن) is a Syrian politician who served as the Minister of Internal Trade and Consumer Protection in the Syrian caretaker government that was formed under prime minister Mohammed al-Bashir in the aftermath of the fall of the Assad regime.
