= List of Syrian governments =

This is a list of Syrian governments since 1918, spanning the Arab Kingdom of Syria, the French Mandate for Syria, the First and Second Syrian Republics, the union with Egypt as the United Arab Republic, the Ba'athist-era Syrian Arab Republic, and the transitional period following the fall of the Assad regime in December 2024. Each government was headed by a prime minister, except during periods when the head of state governed directly, as noted in the list.

== List ==
No.	Government	Head of government	Tenure
OETA East
1	Muhammad Said al-Jaza'iri government	Muhammad Said al-Jaza'iri	27–30 September 1918
2	First Ali al-Rikabi government	Ali al-Rikabi	30 September 1918 – 4 August 1919
3	Council of Directors (1919–1920)	Faisal bin Hussein	4 August 1919 – 26 January 1920
4	Council of Directors (1920)	Faisal bin Hussein	26 January – 8 March 1920
Arab Kingdom of Syria
5	Second Ali al-Rikabi government	Ali al-Rikabi	9 March – 3 May 1920
6	First Hashim al-Atassi government	Hashim al-Atassi	3 May – 24 July 1920
French Mandate for Syria
7	Aladdin al-Droubi government	Aladdin al-Droubi	25 July – 21 August 1920
State of Damascus
8	First Jamil al-Ulshi government	Jamil al-Ulshi	6 September – 30 November 1920
9	First Haqqi al-Azm government	Haqqi al-Azm	1 December 1920 – 28 June 1922
Syrian Federation
10	First Subhi Bey Barakat government	Subhi Bey Barakat	28 June 1922 – 21 December 1924
11	Second Subhi Bey Barakat government	Subhi Bey Barakat	21 December 1924 – 21 December 1925
State of Syria
12	First Ahmad Nami government	Ahmad Nami	4 May – 12 June 1926
13	Second Ahmad Nami government	Ahmad Nami	12 June – 2 December 1926
14	Third Ahmad Nami government	Ahmad Nami	2 December 1926 – 8 February 1928
15	First Taj al-Din al-Hasani government	Taj al-Din al-Hasani	15 February 1928 – 19 November 1931
16	Léon Solomiac government	Léon Solomiac	19 November 1931 – 11 June 1932
First Republic
17	Second Haqqi al-Azm government	Haqqi al-Azm	15 June 1932 – 17 March 1934
18	Second Taj al-Din al-Hasani government	Taj al-Din al-Hasani	17 March 1934 – 23 February 1936
19	First Ata Bey al-Ayyubi government	Ata Bey al-Ayyubi	23 February – 21 December 1936
20	First Jamil Mardam Bey government	Jamil Mardam Bey	21 December 1936 – 23 February 1939
21	Lutfi al-Haffar government	Lutfi al-Haffar	23 February – 5 April 1939
22	Nasuhi al-Bukhari government	Nasuhi al-Bukhari	5 April – 15 May 1939
23	Bahij al-Khatib government	Bahij al-Khatib	8 July 1939 – 1 April 1941
24	First Khalid al-Azm government	Khalid al-Azm	5 April – 12 September 1941
25	First Hassan al-Hakim government	Hassan al-Hakim	20 September 1941 – 17 April 1942
26	Husni al-Barazi government	Husni al-Barazi	18 April 1942 – 8 January 1943
27	Second Jamil al-Ulshi government	Jamil al-Ulshi	8 January – 25 March 1943
28	Second Ata Bey al-Ayyubi government	Ata Bey al-Ayyubi	25 March – 19 August 1943
29	First Saadallah al-Jabiri government	Saadallah al-Jabiri	19 August 1943 – 14 October 1944
30	First Fares al-Khoury government	Fares al-Khoury	14 October 1944 – 5 April 1945
31	Second Fares al-Khoury government	Fares al-Khoury	7 April – 23 August 1945
32	Third Fares al-Khoury government	Fares al-Khoury	26 August – 30 September 1945
33	Second Saadallah al-Jabiri government	Saadallah al-Jabiri	30 September 1945 – 25 April 1946
34	Third Saadallah al-Jabiri government	Saadallah al-Jabiri	26 April – 27 October 1946
35	Second Jamil Mardam Bey government	Jamil Mardam Bey	28 October 1946 – 2 October 1947
36	Third Jamil Mardam Bey government	Jamil Mardam Bey	6 October 1947 – 19 August 1948
37	Fourth Jamil Mardam Bey government	Jamil Mardam Bey	23 August – 2 December 1948
38	Second Khalid al-Azm government	Khalid al-Azm	16 December 1948 – 29 March 1949
39	Husni al-Za'im government	Husni al-Za'im	16 April – 26 June 1949
40	Muhsin al-Barazi government	Muhsin al-Barazi	26 June – 14 August 1949
41	Second Hashim al-Atassi government	Hashim al-Atassi	14 August – 14 December 1949
42	First Nazim al-Qudsi government	Nazim al-Qudsi	24–27 December 1949
43	Third Khalid al-Azm government	Khalid al-Azm	27 December 1949 – 4 June 1950
44	Second Nazim al-Qudsi government	Nazim al-Qudsi	4 June – 8 September 1950
Second Republic
45	Third Nazim al-Qudsi government	Nazim al-Qudsi	8 September 1950 – 27 March 1951
46	Fourth Khalid al-Azm government	Khalid al-Azm	27 March – 9 August 1951
47	Second Hassan al-Hakim government	Hassan al-Hakim	9 August – 28 November 1951
48	First Maarouf al-Dawalibi government	Maarouf al-Dawalibi	28 November – 1 December 1951
49	Fawzi Selu government	Fawzi Selu	9 June 1952 – 11 July 1953
50	Adib Shishakli government	Adib Shishakli (as President)	19 July 1953 – 1 March 1954
51	First Sabri al-Asali government	Sabri al-Asali	1 March – 19 June 1954
52	First Said al-Ghazzi government	Said al-Ghazzi	19 June – 29 October 1954
53	Fourth Fares al-Khoury government	Fares al-Khoury	29 October 1954 – 13 February 1955
54	Second Sabri al-Asali government	Sabri al-Asali	13 February – 13 September 1955
55	Second Said al-Ghazzi government	Said al-Ghazzi	13 September 1955 – 14 June 1956
56	Third Sabri al-Asali government	Sabri al-Asali	14 June – 31 December 1956
57	Fourth Sabri al-Asali government	Sabri al-Asali	31 December 1956 – 6 March 1958
United Arab Republic
58	Fourth Gamal Abdel Nasser government	Gamal Abdel Nasser (as President)	6 March – 7 October 1958
59	Fifth Gamal Abdel Nasser government	Gamal Abdel Nasser (as President)	7 October 1958 – 16 August 1961
60	Sixth Gamal Abdel Nasser government	Gamal Abdel Nasser (as President)	16 August – 28 September 1961
Second Republic
61	Maamun al-Kuzbari government	Maamun al-Kuzbari	29 September – 20 November 1961
62	Izzat al-Nuss government	Izzat al-Nuss	20 November – 22 December 1961
63	Second Maarouf al-Dawalibi government	Maarouf al-Dawalibi	22 December 1961 – 27 March 1962
64	Bashir al-Azma government	Bashir al-Azma	16 April – 17 September 1962
65	Fifth Khalid al-Azm government	Khalid al-Azm	17 September 1962 – 8 March 1963
Ba'athist Syria
66	First Salah al-Din al-Bitar government	Salah al-Din al-Bitar	9 March – 11 May 1963
67	Second Salah al-Din al-Bitar government	Salah al-Din al-Bitar	13 May – 4 August 1963
68	Third Salah al-Din al-Bitar government	Salah al-Din al-Bitar	4 August – 12 November 1963
69	First Amin al-Hafiz government	Amin al-Hafiz	12 November 1963 – 14 May 1964
70	Fourth Salah al-Din al-Bitar government	Salah al-Din al-Bitar	14 May – 3 October 1964
71	Second Amin al-Hafiz government	Amin al-Hafiz	3 October 1964 – 23 September 1965
72	First Yusuf Zuayyin government	Yusuf Zuayyin	23 September – 27 December 1965
73	Fifth Salah al-Din al-Bitar government	Salah al-Din al-Bitar	1 January – 23 February 1966
74	Second Yusuf Zuayyin government	Yusuf Zuayyin	1 March 1966 – 28 October 1968
75	Nureddin al-Atassi government	Nureddin al-Atassi	29 October 1968 – 15 November 1970
76	Hafez al-Assad government	Hafez al-Assad	21 November 1970 – 3 April 1971
77	First Abdul Rahman Khleifawi government	Abdul Rahman Khleifawi	3 April 1971 – 23 December 1972
78	Mahmoud al-Ayyubi government	Mahmoud al-Ayyubi	23 December 1972 – 7 August 1976
79	Second Abdul Rahman Khleifawi government	Abdul Rahman Khleifawi	7 August 1976 – 30 March 1978
80	Muhammad Ali al-Halabi government	Muhammad Ali al-Halabi	30 March 1978 – 14 January 1980
81	First Abdul Rauf al-Kasm government	Abdul Rauf al-Kasm	14 January 1980 – 11 March 1984
82	Second Abdul Rauf al-Kasm government	Abdul Rauf al-Kasm	11 March 1984 – 7 April 1985
83	Third Abdul Rauf al-Kasm government	Abdul Rauf al-Kasm	8 April 1985 – 1 November 1987
84	First Mahmoud Al-Zoubi government	Mahmoud Al-Zoubi	1 November 1987 – 29 June 1992
85	Second Mahmoud Al-Zoubi government	Mahmoud Al-Zoubi	29 June 1992 – 13 March 2000
86	First Mustafa Mero government	Muhammad Mustafa Mero	13 March 2000 – 13 December 2001
87	Second Mustafa Mero government	Muhammad Mustafa Mero	13 December 2001 – 18 September 2003
88	Muhammad Naji al-Otari government	Muhammad Naji al-Otari	18 September 2003 – 14 April 2011
89	Adel Safar government	Adel Safar	14 April 2011 – 23 June 2012
90	Riyad Hijab government	Riyad Farid Hijab	23 June – 6 August 2012
91	First Wael al-Halqi government	Wael Nader al-Halqi	9 August 2012 – 10 August 2014
92	Second Wael al-Halqi government	Wael Nader al-Halqi	10 August 2014 – 22 June 2016
93	Imad Khamis government	Imad Khamis	3 July 2016 – 11 June 2020
94	First Hussein Arnous government	Hussein Arnous	30 August 2020 – 10 August 2021
95	Second Hussein Arnous government	Hussein Arnous	10 August 2021 – 23 September 2024
96	Mohammad Ghazi al-Jalali government	Mohammad Ghazi al-Jalali	23 September – 8 December 2024
Transitional period
97	Syrian caretaker government	Mohammed al-Bashir	10 December 2024 – 29 March 2025
98	Syrian transitional government	Ahmed al-Sharaa (as President)	29 March 2025 – present

== See also ==
- Council of Ministers (Syria)
- List of prime ministers of Syria
