= Adil Arslan =

Syrian politician, poet and writer

- عادل أرسلان
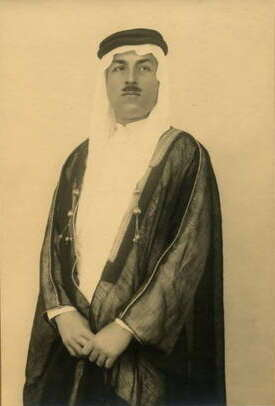

Personal details
- Born: 1880 Beirut
- Died: January 23, 1954 (aged 73–74) Beirut
- Occupation: Politician, poet, writer

Adil Arslân (Arabic: عادل أرسلان; 1880 – 23 January 1954) was a Lebanese Druze politician, writer and poet. He was the older brother of the two princes Shakib Arslan and Nasib Arslan. He was a deputy for Lebanon in the Ottoman Parliament, Deputy Governor General in Syria (1918-1919) and adviser to King Faisal of Iraq and Syria (1919-1920).

== Early life ==
Adil was born to a Druze family in 1880 in Beirut a city which was then under Ottoman rule. His father, Prince Hammoud bin Hassan Arslan, was descended from the princes of Mount Lebanon. Adil's brothers are Prince Nassib, Prince Shakib and Prince Hassan. He attended the American school of Choueifat where he was taught by the writer Boutros Al-Bustani. Later, he would settle again in his native Beirut, where he studied in his higher education. After which he traveled to the capital of the Ottoman Empire, Istanbul, where he enrolled the Faculty of Law and Public Administration.

== Career ==
=== Ottoman Empire ===
Between 1908 and 1912, he was appointed as a member of the Council of Ottoman Representatives for Mount Lebanon which made him the youngest member of the board. After which he will be appointed in 1913 1st Secretary attached to the Ministry of the Interior of Istanbul, then responsible for immigration for Syria in 1914, the equivalent of the Ministry the Interior.

In 1915, he was appointed deputy mayor of the Chouf region in Mount Lebanon and in 1916 Kaymakam of Chouf appointed by the Minister of the Interior.

In context of the Great Arab Revolt he then joined the Young Arab Society where he engage in secret organizations to demand the independence of Arab countries and the establishment of a United Arab State.

=== Syria ===
He assisted in the establishment in Damascus in King Faisal's government, of which he was appointed as a 'special secretary'. Then he was appointed administrative assistant to the Prime Minister until the prince's forfeiture.

In 1925, Arslan joined the Syrian revolutionaries alongside Sultan Pasha al-Atrash to participate in the Great Syrian Revolt against French colonialism. But after the failure of 1926, he was forced to flee Syria, pursued by the French and sentenced to death in absentia.

In 1937, he was appointed head of the delegation of the Arab High Committee which sits in Geneva.

After Syria's independence in 1946, he returned to Damascus and was appointed into several governments as Minister of Education, Health and Social Affairs in 1948, and as Minister of Defense and Foreign Affairs. In 1948, he was elected representative of the Golan and Vice-president of Syria. He was then appointed Deputy Prime Minister and Minister of Foreign Affairs 11 under the government of Hosni al-Zaeem.
