= Arab Democratic Socialist Ba'ath Party =

Syrian political party based in France

Arab Democratic Socialist Ba'ath Party حزب البعث الديمقراطي العربي الاشتراكي
- Spokesperson: Mahmoud Jadid
- Founder: Ibrahim Makhus
- Founded: 13 November 1970
- Split from: Arab Socialist Ba'ath Party of Syria
- Headquarters: Paris, France
- Ideology: Neo-Ba'athism; Democratic socialism Jadidism; Anti-Assadism
- Political position: Far-left
- National affiliation: National Democratic Rally; National Coordination Committee for Democratic Change
- Colors: Black, Red, White and Green (Pan-Arab colors)
- People's Assembly: 0 / 210
- Democratic Council (Disbanded): 1 / 43

Party flag

The Arab Democratic Socialist Ba'ath Party (Arabic: حزب البعث الديمقراطي العربي الاشتراكي Ḥizb al-Ba‘th al-Dīmuqrāṭī al-‘Arabī al-Ishtirākī; French: Parti Baath arabe socialiste démocratique) is a neo-Ba'athist political party founded in 1970 and led by Ibrahim Makhus, a former Syrian foreign minister. It is a remnant of Salah Jadid's left-wing faction of the Arab Socialist Ba'ath Party – Syria Region. The party is based in Paris, France and joined the National Democratic Rally coalition in 1981.

== Ideology ==
Unlike historic Ba'athism which advocates Ba'athist political control of the state, the Arab Democratic Socialist Ba'ath Party supports democratic pluralism. The party advocates the implementation of the laws enshrining freedom of speech, assembly, and equality of opportunities that, although included in the constitution, are not enforced. The party also supports the concept of class struggle.

== Syrian Civil War ==
The Arab Democratic Socialist Ba'ath Party joined the National Coordination Committee for Democratic Change following the beginning of the Syrian Civil War, and has advocated dialogue with the government to ensure a handover of power whilst rejecting both external military intervention and the arming of the opposition. The party also supported Kofi Annan's peace plan. The party also had representation in the Syrian Democratic Council (political wing of the Syrian Democratic Forces).
