= First Khalid al-Azm government =

1941 Syrian government

- 24th government of the Syrian Republic

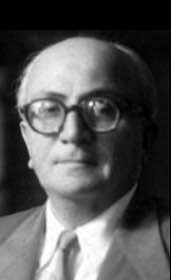
- Date formed: 5 April 1941
- Date dissolved: 12 September 1941

People and organisations
- President: Khalid al-Azm (acting)
- High Commissioner General Delegate: Henri Dentz; Georges Catroux
- Prime Minister: Khalid al-Azm
- No. of ministers: 5
- Member parties: ▌National Bloc; ▌Independent

History
- Legislature term: –
- Predecessor: al-Khatib
- Successor: al-Hakim I

The First Khalid al-Azm government was the twenty-fourth government in the history of modern Syria and the ninth administration of the First Syrian Republic, serving from 5 April 1941 until 12 September 1941. Formed under a decision of the French High Commissioner issued on 2 April 1941 and implemented through decrees numbered 1 to 5, the government was established as a temporary administration during a period of constitutional suspension and political uncertainty. Its head, Khalid al-Azm, was entrusted with the functions of both Prime Minister and Head of State.

Composed of politically neutral figures, the government oversaw Syria during a critical phase of the Second World War, including the entry of Allied forces into the country during the Syria–Lebanon Campaign of 1941. Its tenure lasted only five months, ending on 12 September 1941, when the French authorities restored constitutional rule, appointed Taj al-Din al-Hasani as President of Syria, and announced plans to hold parliamentary elections at the earliest opportunity.

== Composition ==
Portfolio	Minister	Took office	Left office	Party
Prime Minister	Khalid al-Azm	5 April 1941	12 September 1941	Independent
Minister of Interior	Khalid al-Azm	5 April 1941	12 September 1941	Independent
Minister of National Economy	Nasib al-Bakri	5 April 1941	12 September 1941	National Bloc
Minister of Public Works	Nasib al-Bakri	5 April 1941	12 September 1941	National Bloc
Minister of Finance	Hanin Sahnawi	5 April 1941	12 September 1941	Independent
Minister of Justice	Safwat Qater Aghasi	5 April 1941	12 September 1941	Independent
Minister of Education	Muhsin al-Barazi	5 April 1941	12 September 1941	Independent

== See also ==
- Council of Ministers (Syria)
- List of Syrian governments
- Government ministries of Syria
- List of prime ministers of Syria
