= Mohammad Nidal al-Shaar =

Syrian economist and politician (born 1956)

- محمد نضال الشعار

Advisor for Economic and Financial Affairs at the Presidency
- Incumbent
- Assumed office 5 November 2026
- President: Ahmed al-Sharaa

Minister of Economy
- In office 29 March 2025 – 5 November 2025
- President: Ahmed al-Sharaa
- Preceded by: Office established
- Succeeded by: Ahmad Rawad Ramadan

Minister for Economy and Foreign Trade
- In office 14 April 2011 – 23 June 2012
- President: Bashar al-Assad
- Prime Minister: Adel Safar
- Preceded by: Lamia Assi
- Succeeded by: Mohammed Dhafer Mahbek

Member of the People's Assembly
- In office 9 March 2003 – 7 May 2007
- Constituency: Aleppo Governorate

Personal details
- Born: Mohammad Nidal al-Shaar; 1956 (age 69–70) Aleppo, Syria
- Party: Independent
- Children: 2
- Education: University of Aleppo (BA); South Dakota State University (MS); George Washington University (PhD)

Mohammad Nidal al-Shaar (Arabic: محمد نضال الشعار; born 1956) is a Syrian economist and politician who has served as Minister of Economy in the Syrian transitional government since 29 March 2025. He previously served as Minister of Economy and Foreign Trade in the Adel Safar government and a member of the People's Assembly from 2003 to 2007.

Al-Shaar's professional career spans consultancy and training roles in financial markets and institutions across multiple countries. He has advised both private and governmental organizations in the United States and the United Arab Emirates on monetary policy, banking, securities markets, mergers and acquisitions, and investment.

== Early life, education and career ==
Mohammad Nidal al-Shaar was born in Aleppo, Syria, in 1956. He earned a Bachelor of Arts degree in Economics from the University of Aleppo in 1980. He later pursued advanced studies in the United States, obtaining a Master of Science in International Business from South Dakota State University, a Master of Philosophy in Finance and International Investment from George Washington University, and a PhD in economics from George Washington University. Early in his career, he worked as a researcher for the U.S. Department of Housing and Urban Development.

From 1996 to 2001, al-Shaar served as a professor at the University of Aleppo’s Faculty of Economics. During this period, he also held the position of Director of the Central Bank of Syria’s branch in Aleppo. Subsequently, he was Secretary General of the Accounting and Auditing Organization for Islamic Financial Institutions from 2002 to 2012. He has been involved with emerging markets indices and contributed to training staff at the Dubai Financial Market, Dubai Mercantile Exchange, and Abu Dhabi Securities Exchange.

Al-Shaar's career also includes roles as Chief of Market Management and Studies at Fannie Mae in Washington, Vice President at Johnson & Higgins in New York and Washington, and economic adviser at the World Bank. Additionally, he has served as an adjunct professor at George Washington University, where he taught courses on macroeconomics, global economics, money and banking.

On 25 January 2026, al-Shaar visited Raqqa, where he met with Governor Abdul Rahman Salama to discuss ways to enhance economic development in the province.

== See also ==
- Council of Ministers (Syria)
