= Ministry of Expatriates =

Government ministry of Syria

- وزارة المغتربين

Agency overview
- Formed: 29 April 2002
- Dissolved: 2011
- Superseding agency: Ministry of Foreign Affairs and Expatriates
- Headquarters: Damascus

The Ministry of Expatriates (Arabic: وزارة المغتربين) was the ministry of Ba'athist Syria that was responsible for communication with Syrian expatriates around the world. It was established in 2002. It merged into the Ministry of Foreign Affairs and Emigrants on 14 April 2011.

In July 2009, it held the first Syrian Expatriate Youth Forum.

== Ministers of Expatriates ==
- Bouthaina Shaaban (2002 – 30 July 2008)
- Dr. Joseph Sweid (30 July 2008 – 14 April 2011)
