= Husni al-Barazi =

Syrian politician

Husni al-Barazi حسني البرازي

Prime Minister of Syria
- In office 19 April 1942 – 10 January 1943
- President: Taj al-Din al-Hasani
- Preceded by: Hassan al-Hakim
- Succeeded by: Jamil al-Ulshi

Governor of Damascus
- In office February 1942 – April 1942
- Preceded by: Sofouh al-Azm
- Succeeded by: Aref al-Hamzawi

Personal details
- Born: 1895 Hama, Syria vilayet, Ottoman Empire
- Died: 1975 (aged 80) Turkey

Husni al-Barazi (Arabic: حسني البرازي; 1895–1975) was a Syrian politician who served as prime minister.

== Origins and youth ==
Husni al-Barazi was born in the Syrian city of Hama into a prominent landowning family of Kurdish origin. He was educated in Istanbul where he attended classes with the Bedir Khan brothers. Later he received a doctorate degree from the Sorbonne.

== Political activity ==
During the French Mandate, Al-Barazi joined the Syrian opposition to French rule, but in 1926 he was arrested for his opposition activities and was exiled to Lebanon. Upon returning to Syria in 1928, Al-Barazi ran for parliamentary elections and was elected a Member of the Syrian Parliament.

He was appointed Minister of Culture from 1934 till 1936, then Governor of Alexandretta (Iskenderun) from 1936 to 1938. In April 1942 he was appointed Prime Minister, but was removed from his position and isolated by the French authorities in January 1943, following which he again moved to Lebanon.

== Downfall, exile and death ==
Al Barazi returned to Syria in 1946 and remained in his position as Member of Parliament during all the military coups that took place from the late forties until the mid fifties. During this period, he was accused of plotting against the state and was arrested several times. However, in 1948 he was Governor of Aleppo, and the following year became deputy to the military governor of Syria under Husni al-Za'im. In Aleppo he co-founded the newspaper al-Nass, which was critical of Egypt's leader Gamal Abdel Nasser.

He went into final exile in 1954, when, while he was on a trip to Turkey, he was accused of plotting and conspiring against Syria, and was sentenced to death in absentia. In the late 1960s, al-Barazi was pardoned on account of his old age but never returned to Syria; he remained in exile between Lebanon and Turkey, where he died in 1975.
