= Sami al-Jundi =

Syrian politician (1921–1995)

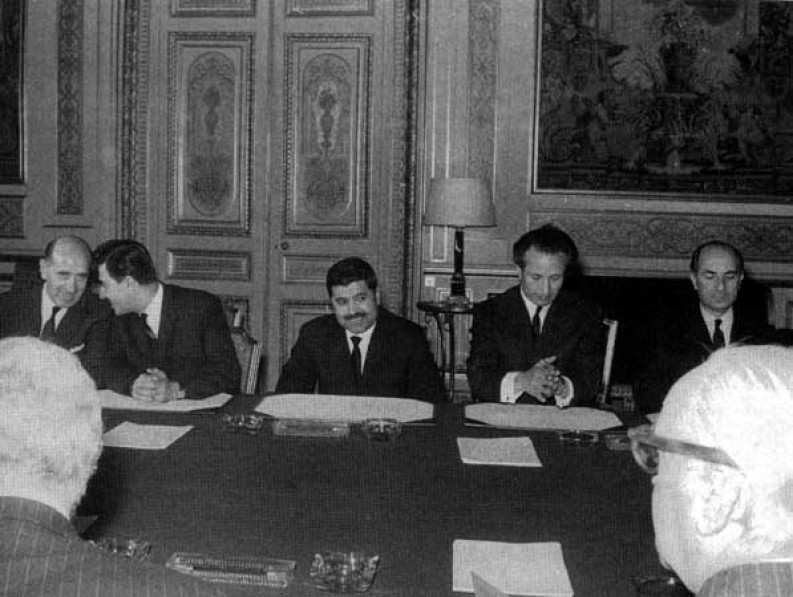
- Sami al-Jundi second from the left, Paris 1967

Member of the Regional Command of the Syrian Regional Branch
- In office 1 February 1964 – 4 April 1965

Minister of Culture
- In office 8 March 1963 – 12 November 1963
- Preceded by: Rafik Gabriel Bashour
- Succeeded by: Shibli al-Aysami

Minister of Information
- In office 13 May 1963 – 14 May 1964
- Preceded by: Jamal al-Atassi
- Succeeded by: Abdullah Abdel-Dayem

Syrian ambassador in France
- In office 11 July 1964 – 1 August 1969
- Preceded by: Assaad Said Mahassen
- Succeeded by: Kamel Hussein

Personal details
- Born: 15 December 1921 Salamiyah, French Mandate of Syria
- Died: 14 December 1995 (aged 73) Damascus, Syrian Arab Republic
- Party: Syrian Regional Branch of the Arab Socialist Ba'ath Party
- Relatives: Ali al-Jundi (brother); Abd al-Karim al-Jundi (cousin)
- Education: Damascus University

Sami al-Jundi (Arabic: سامي الجندي; 15 December 1921 – 14 December 1995) was a Syrian Ba'athist politician, and a follower of Michel Aflaq.

== Life ==
Sami was born to a Sunni father, but hails from a family that is mixed Ismaili-Sunni. An older cousin of Abd al-Karim al-Jundi, Jundi was born to a scholarly family in Salamiyah. He studied dentistry at Damascus University, graduating in 1944. Initially attracted to Arab nationalism by Zaki al-Arsuzi, he joined the Ba'ath Party of Michel Aflaq and Salah al-Din al-Bitar in 1947. In the 1950s he joined Gamal Abdel Nasser's Arab nationalist movement, and Nasser appointed him director of information and propaganda after Egypt and Syria merged as the United Arab Republic in 1958. After the 1961 Syrian coup installed Nazim al-Qudsi, Jundi lost his job, but after the 1963 Syrian coup he became minister of information in Salah al-Bitar's cabinet. He was also official spokesman for the Revolutionary Command Council (RCC).

The RCC named Jundi prime minister, delegating him to form a cabinet on 11 May 1963, but he failed to do so and resigned three days later. He was minister of information, culture and national guidance in Prime Minister Bitar's second cabinet, and remained in government under President Amin al-Hafez until October 1964. In 1964 he became ambassador to France.

Jailed in Syria for some time in 1969, Jundi retired to Beirut, writing his memoirs. After Israeli invaded Lebanon in 1982, he returned to Syria, but worked as a dentist and was not active politically.

Jundi's account of the fate of the Ba'ath Party has been characterized as "an honest and sad portrayal of what has befallen many national anticolonial movements".

== Works ==
- Arab wa Yahud [Arabs and Jews], Beirut, 1968
- Sadiqi Ilyas [My friend Ilyas], Beirut, 1969
- Al Ba`th [The Ba`th], Beirut, 1969
- Athadda wa Attahim [I challenge and I accuse], Beirut, 1969

== Origins of the Ba'ath ==
As a school student, al-Jundi attended political lectures of Arsuzi and became the secretary of a tiny group that called itself the Arab Resurrection (Ba'ath) Party. Of that period he wrote:

We lived through this hope, strangers in our society which gradually increased our isolation: rebels against all the old values, enemies to all the conventions of humanity, rejecting all ceremonies, relationships and religions. We sought the fight everywhere we were an unrelenting pickaxe. ...

We were racialists [’irqiyyin], admiring Nazism, reading its books and the source of its thought, particularly Nietzsche's Thus Spake Zarathustra, Fichte's Addresses to the German Nation, and H. S. Chamberlain's Foundations of the Nineteenth Century, which revolves on race. We were the first to think of translating Mein Kampf.

Whoever has lived during this period in Damascus will appreciate the inclination of the Arab people to Nazism, for Nazism was the power which could serve as its champion, and he who is defeated will by nature love the victor. But our belief was rather different. ...

We were idealists, basing social relationships on love. The Master [Arsuzi] used to speak about Christ, and I think he was influenced by Nietzsche's The Origin of Tragedy. He took the pre-Islamic period for his ideal, calling it the golden age of the Arabs.

Arsuzi's group disbanded in 1944, but most of the members belonged as well to Michel Aflaq's group, also called the Ba'ath, that grew in the Syrian Ba'ath Party.
