= George Tomeh =

Syrian author and diplomat

His excellency George Tomeh جورج طعمة
- Tomeh at the United Nations, New York

Permanent Representative of Syria to the United Nations|Syrian Permanent Representative to the United Nations
- In office 1965–1972
- President: Amin al-Hafiz; Nureddin al-Atassi; Hafez al-Assad
- Deputy: Yahya Arodaki
- Preceded by: Salah el-Dine Tarazi
- Succeeded by: Haissam Kelani

Personal details
- Born: 1922 Al-Midan, Damascus, French mandate of Syria
- Died: 2004 (aged 81–82) Amman, Jordan
- Education: American University of Beirut, Georgetown University
- Profession: Politician, Diplomat, Professor, Academic administrator

George Joseph Tomeh (Arabic: جورج طعمة, born 1922 in Damascus - died 2004 in Amman) was a Syrian author, diplomat, and spokesman of the Arab cause in the United States.

== Education ==
Tomeh obtained a master of arts degree from the American University of Beirut and a doctorate from Georgetown University in Washington, D.C.

== Career ==
=== Diplomat ===
Beginning in 1945, Tomeh represented the Syrian government in various capacities. Tomeh began his diplomatic career at the Syrian Embassy in London. He later served as Consul General of the United Arab Republic (Syria and Egypt) in New York City. Finally, he was appointed as Permanent Representative (Ambassador) of the Syrian Arab Republic to the United Nations. At the United Nations, Tomeh was a member of the committees dealing with the definition of aggression, decolonization and apartheid. In November 1970, he was the president of the Security Council. He was also appointed as minister of economics of the Syrian Government in 1964.

=== Educator ===
In 1965, he was appointed professor of philosophy at the Syrian University. Tomeh was founding president (1988–1990) of University of Balamand in Lebanon where he was professor of philosophy and history as well. Aside from teaching Dr. Tomeh has written books in Arabic and in English.

=== Advisor ===
Tomeh served as an advisor to the Arab Petroleum Exporting Countries (OAPEC) following his resignation from politics.
