= Hassan al-Hakim =

Syrian politician

- حسن الحكيم

Prime Minister of Syria
- In office September 12, 1941 – April 19, 1942
- President: Khalid al-Azm; Taj al-Din al-Hasani
- Preceded by: Khalid al-Azm
- Succeeded by: Husni al-Barazi
- In office August 9, 1951 – November 13, 1951
- President: Hashim al-Atassi
- Preceded by: Khalid al-Azm
- Succeeded by: Zaki al-Khatib

Personal details
- Born: 1886 Damascus, Ottoman Syria
- Died: March 30, 1982 (aged 95–96) Damascus, Syria

Hassan al-Hakim (Arabic: حسن الحكيم; 1886 – March 30, 1982) was the Prime Minister of Mandatory Syria from September 12, 1941 until April 19, 1942 and again of the independent Syrian Republic from August 9, 1951 until November 13, 1951.

Preceded by Khalid al-Azm	Prime Minister of Syria; September 12, 1941 – April 19, 1942	Succeeded by Husni al-Barazi
Preceded by Khalid al-Azm	Prime Minister of Syria; August 9 – November 13, 1951	Succeeded by Zaki al-Khatib
