= Shibli al-Aysami =

Syrian Arab nationalist politician (1925–2011)

Shibli al-Ayssami
- شبلي العيسمي
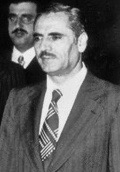
- al-Aysami in the early 1970s

Deputy Secretary General of the National Command of the Iraq-based Ba'ath Party
- In office 1974–1979

Vice President of Syria
- In office 28 December 1965 – 23 February 1966
- President: Amin al-Hafiz
- Preceded by: Nureddin al-Atassi
- Succeeded by: Mahmoud al-Ayyubi

Regional Secretary of the Arab Socialist Ba'ath Party – Syria Region
- In office 5 February 1964 – 4 October 1964

Minister of Agrarian Reform
- In office 9 March 1963 – 11 November 1963
- Preceded by: Amin al-Nafouri
- Succeeded by: Adil Tarabin

Personal details
- Born: Shiblī Yousef Hamad al-Aysamī'; 5 February 1925 Imtan, al-Suwayda, Syria
- Died: presumably 4 June 2011 (aged 86) or after
- Party: Arab Socialist Ba'ath Party; Iraqi Branch of the Ba'ath Party
- Relatives: Tareck El Aissami (great-nephew)
- Profession: Politician

Shiblī Yousef Hamad al-Aysamī (Arabic: شبلي العيسمي), alternatively also Shibli-L-Aʾysami, al-Ayasami, al-Ayssami or al-ʿAisamī, (5 February 1925 – June 4, 2011) was a Syrian politician and Arab nationalist figure. He was born to a Druze family in al-Suwayda, Syria. He was kidnapped by unknown persons in Aley, Lebanon and is presumed to be dead.

== Political career ==
=== Syria ===
He was born to a Syrian Druze family. In 1947, together with Michel Aflaq, he became a founding member of the Arab Socialist Ba'ath Party and from 1963 to 1964 he held different ministerial posts in the Syrian government. In 1964 he was elected as General Secretary of the Syrian Regional Command of the Ba'ath Party and in 1965 he became Vice President of Syria under Amin al-Hafiz.

=== Iraq ===
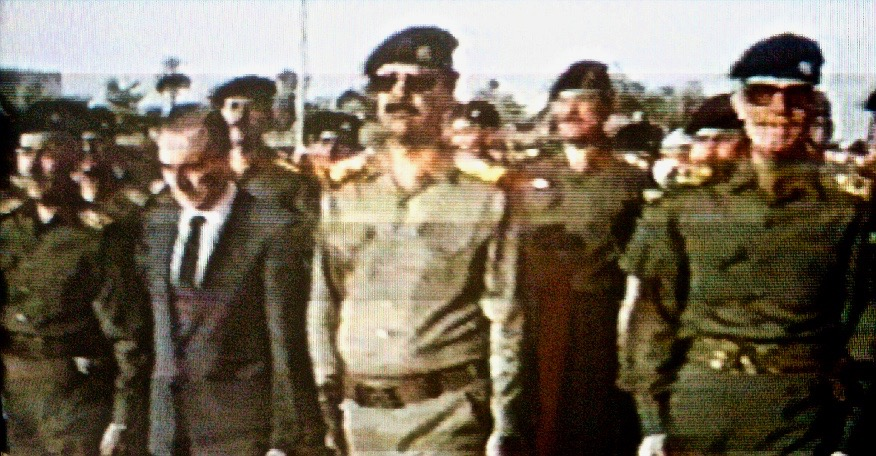
al-Aysami in a suit beside Saddam Hussein in July 1989.

Following the 1966 Syrian coup d'état which resulted in President al-Hafiz being overthrown and the creation of the Syrian-Iraqi rift, al-Aysami, then Vice President of Syria, fled to Iraq. In 1974 the Iraqi Branch of the Ba'ath Party installed a rival National Command of the Ba'ath Party with Michel Aflaq as General Secretary and al-Aysami as his deputy (until 1979).

In 1982, al-Hafiz and al-Aysami, together with Islamist, nationalist and leftist opposition groups founded the Iraqi-backed National Alliance for the Liberation of Syria, but in 1992 al-Aysami retired from political life. He remained in Iraq until the 2003 invasion of Iraq and fled to Egypt, then the United States and Lebanon thereafter.

== Kidnapping ==
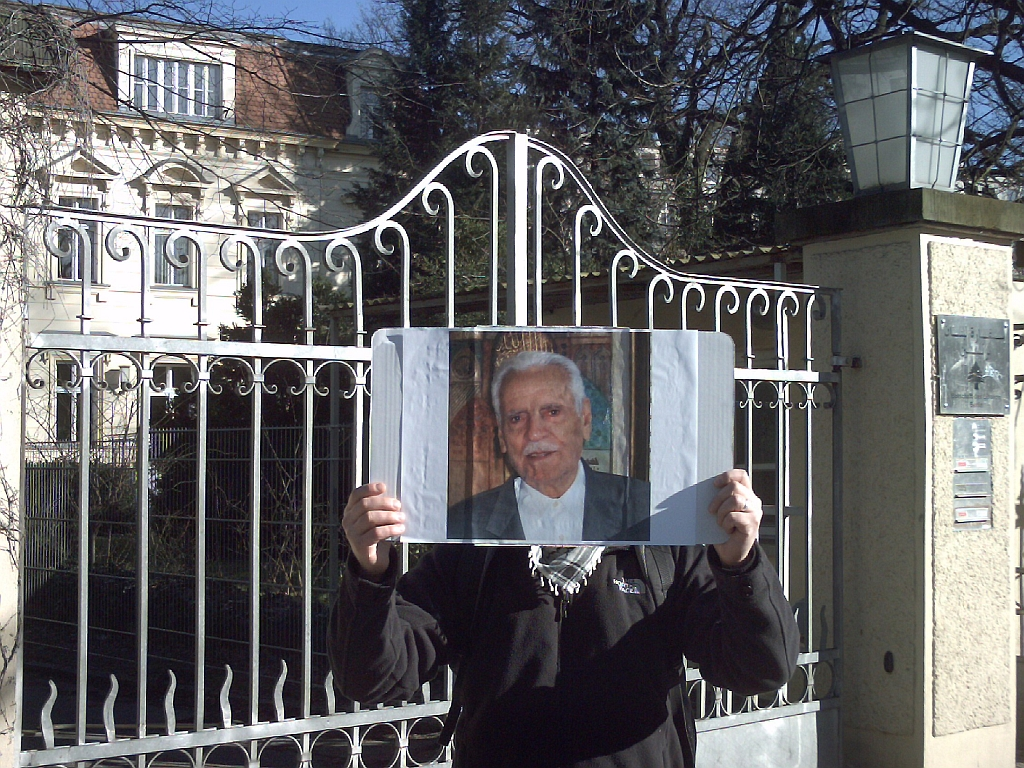
Berlin, February 2014: Ba'athist student in front of the Lebanese embassy reminding people of al-Aysami's disappearance

On 18 May 2011, Al-Aysami, a legal permanent resident of the United States, departed the country and arrived in Lebanon the following day. On 24 May, he went for a walk near his daughter's residence in Aley, where witnesses later reported that he was forced into one of several black SUVs seen in the area. An extensive search was conducted by family members, local residents, and Lebanese authorities, including hospital checks and the use of sniffer dogs, but his whereabouts remain unknown.

His family suspected he was kidnapped and transferred to Syria, accusing the government of Bashar al-Assad of responsibility. Syrian authorities denied involvement and instead accused Lebanese Druze leader Walid Jumblatt. Human Rights Watch and Lebanese officials criticised the slow pace and lack of progress in the investigation, citing systemic failures to pursue crimes believed to be politically motivated.

According to the Lebanese Institute for Democracy and Human Rights (LIFE), al-Aysami died around 4 June 2011, while in detention at a Syrian Air Force Intelligence prison in the Mezzeh district of Damascus.

== Personal life ==
He was the great-uncle of Tareck El Aissami, later Vice President of Venezuela.

== See also ==
- List of kidnappings
- List of people who disappeared mysteriously: post-1970

== Bibliography ==
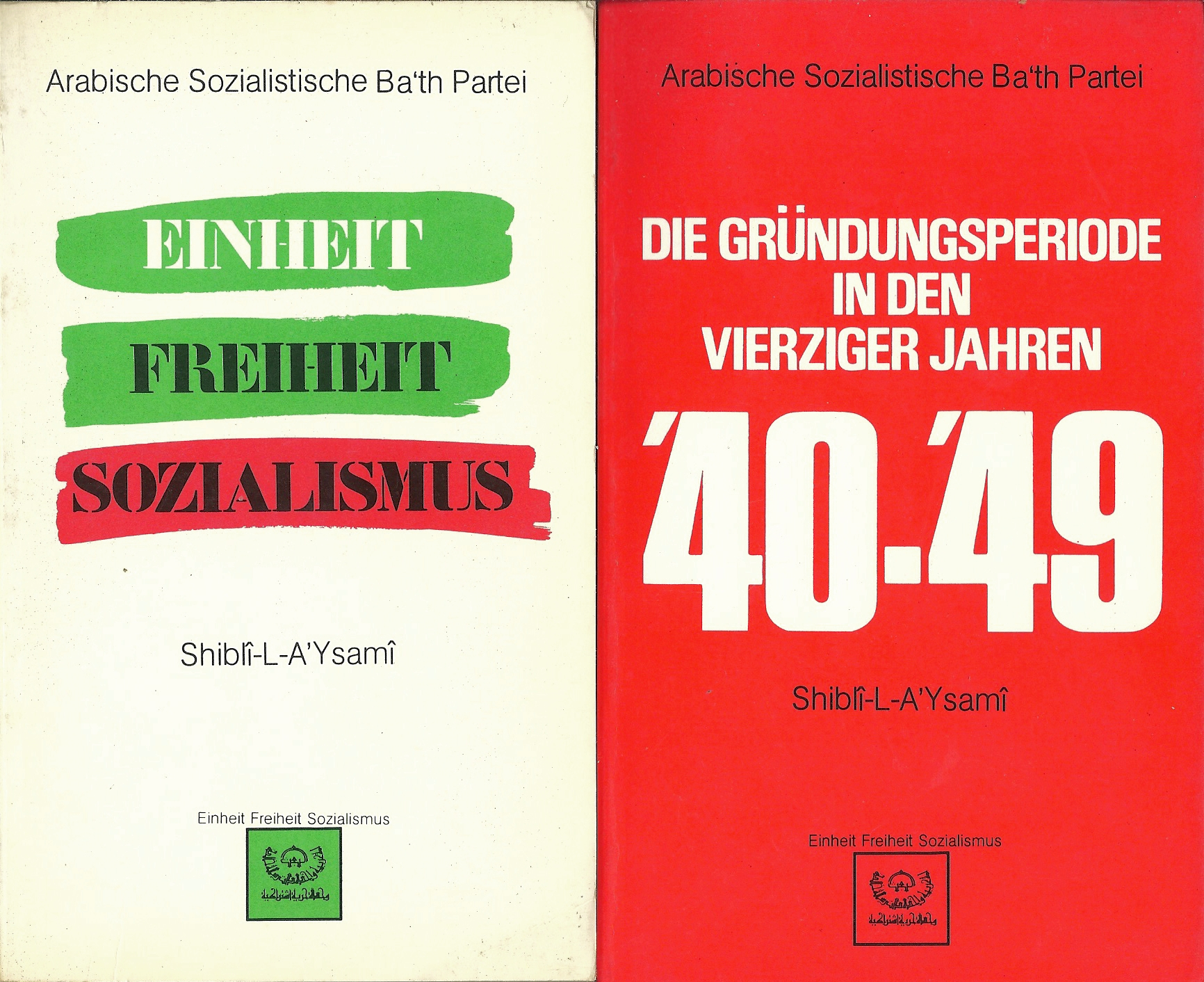
Shibli al-Aysami's books about concepts and history of the Ba'ath Party were translated into several languages, for example into German: Einheit, Freiheit, Sozialismus (Unity, Freedom, Socialism) and Die Gründungsperiode in den vierziger Jahren (The founding period in the 1940s)

- Muhafazat al-Suwayad (1962)
- La révolution arabe (1971)
- Arab Unity through experience (Beirut, 1971)
- Unity, Freedom, Socialism (Madrid, 1976)
- Arabische Sozialistische Ba'th Partei: Die Gründungsperiode in den vierziger Jahren (Varese, 1977)
