= Deputy Prime Minister of Syria =

Senior member of the Syrian government (1948–2025)

Vice President of the Council of Ministers of the Syrian Arab Republic
- نائب رئيس مجلس الوزراء في الجمهورية العربية السورية
- Seal of the Deputy Prime Minister of Syria
- Style: Mr Deputy Prime Minister (informal); His Excellency (diplomatic)
- Status: Abolished
- Member of: Council of Ministers
- Reports to: Prime Minister
- Residence: Government building, Damascus, Syria
- Nominator: Prime Minister
- Appointer: President
- Term length: No term limits
- Inaugural holder: Mustafa Nehmeh (kingdom); Lutfi al-Haffar (republic)
- Formation: 23 August 1948; 78 years ago
- Abolished: 29 March 2025
- Website: www.pministry.gov.sy

The deputy prime minister of Syria (Arabic: نايب رئيس الوزراء في سوريا, romanized: Nayib Raʾīs al-wuzarāʾ fī Sūriyā), officially the vice president of the Council of Ministers of the Syrian Arab Republic, was a position in the Council of Ministers of Syria.

The deputy prime minister was the second highest-ranking member of the Council of Ministers, after the prime minister. In the previous semi-presidential system used under both Ba'athist Syria and the Syrian caretaker government, the prime minister was treated as the "first among equals" in the cabinet; the position of deputy prime minister was used to bring political stability and strength within a government or in times of national emergency when a proper chain of command was necessary. The post became vacant on 28 April 2022 and was formally abolished following the establishment of the Syrian transitional government on 29 March 2025.

== List of deputy prime ministers ==
- Ali Abdullah Ayyoub
- Adil Arslan
- Bashir al-Azma
- Rashad Barmada
- Abdullah Dardari
- Lutfi al-Haffar
- Mohammad al-Hussein
- Abdul Halim Khaddam
- Qadri Jamil
- Ibrahim Makhous
- Walid Muallem
- Abd al-Qadir Qaddura
- Khalid Raad
- Farouk al-Sharaa
- Mustafa Tlass
- Salim Yasin

== See also ==
- Prime Minister of Syria
- Council of Ministers (Syria)
