= Ibrahim Makhous =

Syrian politician

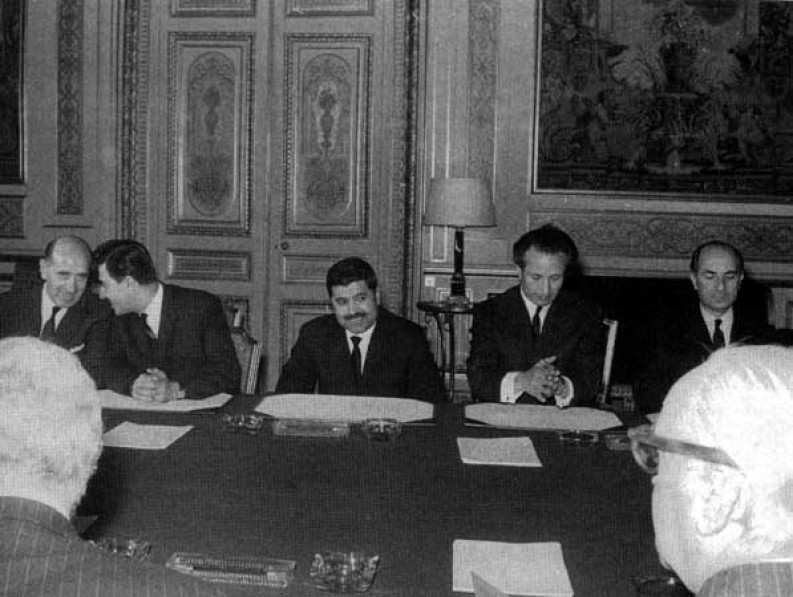
- Ibrahim Makhous second from the right, Paris 1967

Peasants' Bureau of the Regional Command of the Syrian Regional Branch
- In office March 1968 – 13 November 1970
- Preceded by: Muhammad Ashawi
- Succeeded by: Mahmūd Zuʿbi

Minister of Foreign Affairs
- In office 1 March 1966 – 29 October 1968
- Preceded by: Salah al-Din al-Bitar
- Succeeded by: Muhammad Ashawi
- In office 22 September 1965 – 21 December 1965
- Preceded by: Hassan Mraywed
- Succeeded by: Salah al-Din al-Bitar

Member of the Regional Command of the Syrian Regional Branch
- In office 27 March 1966 – 13 November 1970

Personal details
- Born: 1925 Damascus, French Mandate of Syria
- Died: 10 September 2013 (aged 88) Algiers, Algeria
- Party: Syrian Regional Branch of the Arab Socialist Ba'ath Party
- Other political affiliations: Democratic Socialist Arab Ba'ath Party
- Education: Damascus University

Ibrahim Makhous (Arabic: إبراهيم ماخوس, romanized: Ibrahim Makhūs, also known as Brahim Makhous) (1925 – September 2013), was a Syrian Baathist politician who sat on the Regional Command from 1966 to 1970. He served as foreign minister during Salah Jadid's rule.

After Hafiz al-Asad's seizure of power, Makhous, who was in exile, established the Democratic Socialist Arab Ba'ath Party. He died in 2013, at the age of 88.

== Early life ==
Ibrahim Makhūs was born to a religious and rural Alawite family from the village of Makhūs—the family's namesake—between Latakia and Antioch. His father was a religious shaykh who also worked as a landless cultivator, although he eventually came to own 100 dunams of agricultural land. He served as the arbiter of local disputes and founded a large charitable organization in the Syrian coastal region called "al-Jam'iyyah al-Khayriyyah". It grew to set up a presence in some seventy villages and established one of the first co-ed secondary school in the area.

From a young age, Makhūs worked with his father's association, frequently traveling throughout Latakia's hinterland where he became intimately aware of the peasantry's hardships. While a student, he fought in the 1948 Arab-Israeli War as a volunteer for the Arab forces.

During the Algerian War of Independence, which began in 1954, he served as a volunteer physician.
