= Ministry of Industry (Syria) =

Government ministry of Syria

- وزارة الصناعة

Agency overview
- Formed: 1958
- Dissolved: 2025
- Superseding agency: Ministry for Economy and Industry
- Jurisdiction: Government of Syria
- Headquarters: Damascus, Syria
- Minister responsible: Last minister: Basel Abdul Hannan
- Website: http://moid.gov.sy/

The Ministry of Industry (Arabic: وزارة الصناعة, romanized: Wizārat al-Ṣināʻah) was the ministry of the Government of Syria responsible for managing the industrial sector in Syria. On 29 March 2025, the Ministry of Industry, the Ministry of Economy and Foreign Trade and the Ministry of Internal Trade and Consumer Protection were merged to become the Ministry of Economy and Industry.

== Organisation ==
Sections:

- Cost department
- Department of Internal Control
- Directorate of Legal Affairs
- Technical Affairs Directorate
- Production Department
- Directorate of Administrative Development
- Department of Informatics
- Directorate of Organizing Craftsmen
- Directorate of Planning and International Relations
- Directorate of Financial Affairs
- Directorate of Administrative Affairs
- Industrial Investment Directorate * Marketing Department
- Press office

== Responsibilities ==
Management of public sector institutions, financing of companies and industrial institutions, regulation of the industrial sector.

A number of governmental institutions and companies belonging to it while the industrial bank is responsible for lending to private sector companies, as well as the chambers of industry in the provinces, and it also participates in the youth employment program in Syria.

== See also ==
- Government ministries of Syria
- Ministry of Industry
