= Ministry of Economy and Industry (Syria) =

Government ministry of Syria

Ministry of Economy
- وزارة الاقتصاد

Agency overview
- Formed: 29 March 2025; 19 months ago
- Preceding agency: Ministry of Economy and Foreign Trade
- Jurisdiction: Government of Syria
- Headquarters: Yusuf al-Azma Square, Damascus
- Minister responsible: Ahmad Rawad Ramadan
- Website: moe.gov.sy

The Ministry of Economy (Arabic: وزارة الاقتصاد) is a government ministry in Syria and part of the cabinet. It was established on 29 March 2025 as the result of a merger between the Ministry of Economy and Foreign Trade, the Ministry of Industry, and the Ministry of Internal Trade and Consumer Protection.

The ministry is headed by a central administration and is divided into three principal branches: the General Directorate of Industry, the General Directorate of Economy, and the General Directorate of Internal Trade and Consumer Protection.

The General Directorate of Industry oversees industrial policy, industrial zones, technical standards, and state-owned industrial enterprises. The General Directorate of Economy is responsible for economic policy, foreign trade, export promotion, and the development of small and medium-sized enterprises. The General Directorate of Internal Trade and Consumer Protection supervises domestic trade, consumer protection, market regulation, and state-owned trading companies.

The central administration includes directorates responsible for planning, finance, legal affairs, administrative development, digital transformation, government communication, and internal oversight. The ministry operates through a network of directorates, affiliated agencies, and provincial offices across Syria.

== Ministers of Economy and Industry ==
No.	Name	Term of office		Ref.
No.	Name	Took office	Left office	Ref.
1	Mohammad Nidal al-Shaar	29 March 2025	Incumbent	

== See also ==
- Council of Ministers (Syria)
