= Government ministries of Syria =

Government ministries of Syria comprise the portfolios of the Cabinet of Syria. Syria has been undergoing a political transition, with President Ahmed al-Sharaa leading the Syrian transitional government.

== Current ministries ==
- Ministry of Administrative Development
- Ministry of Agriculture
- Ministry of Communications and Information Technology
- Ministry of Culture
- Ministry of Defense
- Ministry of Economy
- Ministry of Education
- Ministry of Emergency and Disaster Management
- Ministry of Endowments
- Ministry of Energy
- Ministry of Finance
- Ministry of Foreign Affairs and Expatriates
- Ministry of Health
- Ministry of Higher Education and Scientific Research
- Ministry of Information
- Ministry of Interior
- Ministry of Justice
- Ministry of Local Administration and Environment
- Ministry of Public Works and Housing
- Ministry of Social and Labour Affairs
- Ministry of Transport
- Ministry of Tourism
- Ministry of Sports and Youth
- Ministry of Industry, Internal Trade and Consumer Protection

== Abolished ministries ==
- Ministry of Economy and Foreign Trade
- Ministry of Industry
- Ministry of Oil and Mineral Resources
- Ministry of Electricity
- Ministry of Water Resources
- Ministry of Expatriates
- Ministry of Irrigation
- Ministry of Presidential Affairs
- Ministry of State for Southern Development Affairs
- Ministry of State for Investment Affairs, Vital Projects and Southern Development
- Ministry of State for People's Assembly Affairs

== See also ==
- Government of Syria
- Cabinet of Syria
- Politics of Syria
