= Ministry of Transport (Syria) =

Government ministry of Syria

- وزارة النقل; Wizārat an-Naql

Agency overview
- Formed: 23 September 1974
- Jurisdiction: Government of Syria
- Minister responsible: Yaarub Bader
- Website: mot.gov.sy

The Ministry of Transport (Arabic: وِزَارَةُ النَّقْلِ, romanized: Wizārat an-Naql) is a government agency of Syria that specializes in transport in Syria. Its head office is in Damascus.

The Ministry of Transport oversees Syrian Railways, a state-owned public institution that serves as Syria’s primary and sole operator of rail transport, responsible for the management, operation, and development of the national railway network.

== History ==
Former logo of this ministry until 2024.

The Ministry of Transport of Syria was formally established by Legislative Decree No. 93 on 23 September 1974. Its most recent restructuring was carried out under Legislative Decree No. 209 of 2003, which provided for the establishment of a public institution with a developmental service character known as the General Establishment for Road Transport. This institution became affiliated with the Minister of Transport as of 1 January 2004.

As a result of this decree, one of the ministry’s most significant responsibilities—the management of central roads and bridges—was separated from the Ministry of Transport and transferred to the newly established corporation. Responsibility for local roads and bridges within the governorates remained with the Ministry of Local Administration, implemented through the Directorates of Technical Services in each governorate.

The origins of transport administration in Syria date back to 1920, when early governmental bodies responsible for public works and transport were formed. Over the course of a century, these institutions evolved and expanded, playing a major role in building the infrastructure of the Syrian economy. Throughout different historical periods, the Ministry of Transport and its predecessor entities were responsible for a wide range of sectors and public services, including roads and bridges, communications, postal services, transportation, irrigation, radio broadcasting, oil and mineral resources, electricity, construction and development, public utilities, civil aviation, and meteorology.

The ministry operated under several names during the 20th century, reflecting changes in administrative organization. These included the Directorate of Public Works, the Ministry of Public Works, Post and Telegraph, and the Ministry of Public Works and Transport, before the eventual abolition or redistribution of its functions.

During this period, a number of specialized ministries were established and assumed responsibilities previously handled by the Ministry of Transport or its predecessors. These included the ministries of Municipal and Rural Affairs, Information, Public Works, Oil and Mineral Resources, Electricity, Water Resources, Construction and Development, Housing and Utilities, and Local Administration.
