= Ministry of Economy and Foreign Trade =

Government ministry of Syria

- وزارة الاقتصاد والتجارة

Agency overview
- Formed: 1920, 2012 (latest form)
- Preceding agency: Ministry of Economy and Foreign Trade Ministry of Supply and Internal Trade
- Dissolved: 2025
- Superseding agency: Ministry of Economy and Industry
- Jurisdiction: Government of Syria
- Headquarters: Damascus
- Website: syrecon.gov.sy

The Ministry of Economy and Foreign Trade (Arabic: وزارة الاقتصاد والتجارة) of Syria was the ministry that was responsible of drawing the state's economic policy in general and trade policy in particular. It was established in 2003 and again in 2012 as a replacement to the Ministry of Economy and Foreign Trade and the Ministry of Supply and Internal Trade. On 29 March 2025, the Ministry of Economy and Foreign Trade, the Ministry of Industry and the Ministry of Internal Trade and Consumer Protection were merged to become the Ministry of Economy and Industry.

== Ministry departments ==
- Directorates of Economy in the Governorates.
- Governorate domestic trade directorates.
- Central Administration.

== Ministers of Economy and Foreign Trade ==
- Abdul Karim Zuhoor (1963)
- George Tohme (1963-1964)
- Kamal Hosni (1964)
- Ibrahim al-Bitar (1964-1965)
- Kamal Hosni (1965-1966)
- Ahmed Murad (1966-1968)
- Zuhair al-Khani (1968-1970)
- Mustafa Hallaj (1970-1972)
- Muhammad al-Imadi (1972-1980)
- Muhammad al-Atrash (1980-1981)
- Salim Said Yasin (1981–1985)
- Muhammad al-Imadi (7 April 1985 - 13 December 2001)
- Ghassan Al Rifai (13 December 2001 – 4 October 2004)
- Amer Husni Lutfi (4 October 2004 – 19 January 2010)
- Lamia Assi (19 January 2010 – 29 March 2011)
- Mohammad Nidal al-Shaar (14 April 2011 – 23 June 2012)
- Mohamed Dhafer Mahbek (23 June 2012 - 22 August 2013)
- Humam Al Jazaeri (22 August 2013 - 3 July 2016)
- Adeeb Mayala (3 July 2016 - 29 March 2017)
- Mohammad Samer al-Khalil (29 March 2017 - 23 September 2024)
- Mohammad Rabie Qalaaji (23 September 2024 - 8 December 2024)
- Vacant (8 December 2024 - 10 December 2024)
- Basel Abdul Hannan (10 December 2024 - 29 March 2025)

== See also ==
- Economy of Syria
