= Ministry of Defense (Syria) =

Government ministry of Syria

- وزارة الدفاع
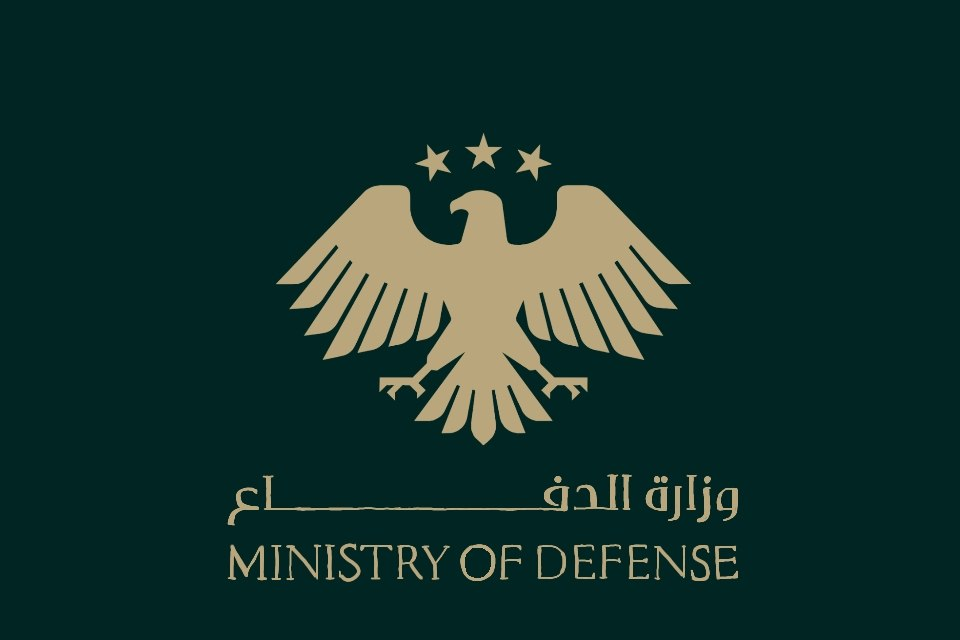
- Flag of the Ministry of Defense

Agency overview
- Formed: 1920; 106 years ago
- Jurisdiction: Government of Syria
- Headquarters: Hay'at al-Arkan, Umayyad Square, Damascus; 33°30′50.58″N 36°16′42.58″E
- Minister responsible: Murhaf Abu Qasra
- Child agencies: General Staff of the Army and Armed Forces; Syrian Armed Forces
- Website: mod.gov.sy

The Ministry of Defense (Arabic: وزارة الدفاع, romanized: Wizārat al-Difāʿ) is a cabinet ministry of Syria, responsible for defense affairs and national security. Murhaf Abu Qasra, Minister of Defense holds the position of Deputy Commander-in-Chief of the Army and Armed Forces.

== History ==
=== Contemporary Syria ===
Following the fall of the regime of Bashar al-Assad in December 2024, caretaker prime minister Mohammed al-Bashir has said the defense ministry would be restructured using former rebel factions and officers who defected from the former Ba'athist armed forces.

On 16 July 2025, the Israeli Air Force bombed the entrance and two of its facades to the defense ministry headquarters in Damascus, amid the July 2025 southern Syria clashes.

=== Incorporation of rebel groups ===
At the Syrian Revolution Victory Conference, which was held in late January 2025, the Syrian caretaker government announced the dissolution of all security agencies of the Ba'athist regime and all militias established by it. In addition, the Syrian opposition groups are expected to be dissolved and merged into the ministry. The Ministry of Defense later reported that over 70 armed factions across six regions in total agreed to participate in the new administration.

However, one leader from the Syrian National Army indicated that the dissolution of different groups will be done "gradually", while a rebel leader from Daraa Governorate confirmed that the rebel groups had been ordered to disband, but that the "implementation" needs more time until more clarity is provided on how the ministry will ultimately be structured.

As of February 2025, the ministry has formed a committee focused on restructuring and managing assets, as well as a "sub-committee" whose purpose is to determine a new "internal structure" for the armed forces.

== List of ministers of defense ==
=== Arab Kingdom of Syria (1918–1920) ===
No.	Portrait	Name (Birth–Death)	Term of office			Political party	Government	Ref.
No.	Portrait	Name (Birth–Death)	Took office	Left office	Time in office	Political party	Government	Ref.
1		Abdul Hamid Pasha Al-Qaltaqi (1875–1925)	9 March 1920	3 May 1920	55 days	Independent	al-Rikabi II	
2		Yusuf al-Azma (1883–1920)	3 May 1920	24 July 1920 †	82 days	Al-Fatat	al-Atassi I	
3		Jamil al-Ulshi (1883–1951)	25 July 1920	30 November 1920	128 days	Independent	al-Droubi al-Ulshi I	

=== French Mandate for Syria (1920–1946) ===
No.	Portrait	Name (Birth–Death)	Term of office			Political party	Government	Ref.
No.	Portrait	Name (Birth–Death)	Took office	Left office	Time in office	Political party	Government	Ref.
1		Shukri al-Quwatli (1891–1967)	21 December 1936	22 March 1938	1 year, 91 days	National Bloc	Bey I	
2		Jamil Mardam Bey (1895–1960)	22 March 1938	23 February 1939	338 days	National Bloc	Bey I	
3		Mazhar Raslan (1886–1948)	23 February 1939	5 April 1939	41 days	National Bloc	al-Haffar	
4		Nasuhi al-Bukhari (1881–1961)	5 April 1939	4 July 1939	90 days	Independent	al-Bukhari	
5		Abd al-Ghaffar al-Atrash (1879–1942)	20 September 1941	15 March 1942 †	176 days	Independent	al-Hakim I	
6		Hasan al-Atrash (1905–1977)	18 April 1942	25 March 1943	341 days	Independent	al-Barazi al-Ulshi II	
7		Ata Bey al-Ayyubi (1874–1950)	25 March 1943	19 August 1943	147 days	Independent	al-Ayyubi	
(4)		Nasuhi al-Bukhari (1881–1961)	19 August 1943	14 October 1944	1 year, 56 days	Independent	al-Jabiri	
(2)		Jamil Mardam Bey (1895–1960)	14 October 1944	26 August 1945	316 days	National Bloc	al-Khoury I–II	
8		Khalid al-Azm (1903–1965)	26 August 1945	30 September 1945	35 days	Independent	al-Khoury III	
9		Saadallah al-Jabiri (1892–1947)	30 September 1945	27 April 1946	209 days	National Bloc	al-Jabiri II	

=== First Syrian Republic and Second Syrian Republic (1946–1958) ===
No.	Portrait	Name (Birth–Death)	Term of office			Political party	Government	Ref.
No.	Portrait	Name (Birth–Death)	Took office	Left office	Time in office	Political party	Government	Ref.
1		Nabih al-Azma (1886–1964)	27 April 1946	17 June 1946	51 days	National Bloc	al-Jabiri III	
2		Ahmad al-Sharabati (1905–1975)	17 June 1946	23 May 1948	1 year, 341 days	Independent	al-Jabiri III; Bey II–III	
3		Jamil Mardam Bey (1895–1960)	23 August 1948	12 December 1948	111 days	National Party	Bey III–IV	
4		Khalid al-Azm (1903–1965)	12 December 1948	17 April 1949	126 days	Independent	al-Azm II	
5		Husni al-Za'im (1897–1949)	17 April 1949	1 July 1949	75 days	Independent	al-Za'im	
6		Abdullah Atfeh (1897–1976)	1 July 1949	24 December 1949	176 days	Independent	al-Barazi al-Atassi II	
7		Fawzi Selu (1905–1972)	24 December 1949	28 December 1949	4 days	Independent	al-Qudsi I	
8		Akram al-Hawrani (1911–1966)	28 December 1949	4 June 1950	158 days	Arab Party Movement	al-Azm III	
(7)		Fawzi Selu (1905–1972)	4 June 1950	13 November 1951	1 year, 162 days	Independent	al-Qudsi II–III al-Azm IV al-Hakim II	
9		Zaki al-Khatib (1887–1961)	13 November 1951	28 November 1951	15 days	People's Party	al-Hakim II	
10		Maarouf al-Dawalibi (1909–2004)	28 November 1951	29 November 1951	1 day	People's Party	al-Dawalibi I	
(7)		Fawzi Selu (1905–1972)	2 December 1951	19 July 1953	1 year, 229 days	Military	Selu	
11		Raf'at Khankan (1903–1970)	19 July 1953	1 March 1954	225 days	Military	Shishakli	
(10)		Maarouf al-Dawalibi (1909–2004)	1 March 1954	19 June 1954	110 days	People's Party	al-Asali I	
12		Said al-Ghazzi (1893–1967)	19 June 1954	3 November 1954	137 days	Independent	al-Ghazzi I	
13		Rashad Barmada (1893–1967)	3 November 1954	13 February 1955	102 days	People's Party	al-Khoury IV	
(4)		Khalid al-Azm (1903–1965)	13 February 1955	13 September 1955	212 days	Independent	al-Asali II	
(13)		Rashad Barmada (1893–1967)	13 September 1955	14 June 1956	275 days	People's Party	al-Ghazzi II	
14		Abd al-Hasib Raslan (1901–1959)	14 June 1956	31 December 1956	200 days	Independent	al-Asali III	
(4)		Khalid al-Azm (1903–1965)	31 December 1956	22 February 1958	1 year, 53 days	Independent	al-Asali IV	

=== United Arab Republic (1958–1961) ===
No.	Portrait	Name (Birth–Death)	Term of office			Political party	Government	Ref.
No.	Portrait	Name (Birth–Death)	Took office	Left office	Time in office	Political party	Government	Ref.
1		Abdel Hakim Amer (1916–1967)	22 February 1958	28 September 1961	3 years, 218 days	National Union	Nasser IV–V–VI	

=== Second Syrian Republic and Ba'athist Syrian Arab Republic (1961–2024) ===
No.	Portrait	Name (Birth–Death)	Term of office			Political party	Government
No.	Portrait	Name (Birth–Death)	Took office	Left office	Time in office	Political party	Government
1	Maamun al-Kuzbari	Maamun al-Kuzbari (1914–1998)	28 September 1961	20 November 1961	53 days	Independent	al-Kuzbari
2	Izzat al-Nuss	Izzat al-Nuss (1912–1976)	20 November 1961	22 December 1961	32 days	Independent	al-Nuss
3	Rashad Barmada	Rashad Barmada (1913–1988)	22 December 1961	16 April 1962	115 days	People's	al-Dawalibi
4	Abdul Karim Zahreddine [ar]	General; Abdul Karim Zahreddine (1917–2009)	16 April 1962	8 March 1963	326 days	Independent	al-Azma al-Azm
5	Muhammad al-Sufi	Field Marshal; Muhammad al-Sufi (1927–2018)	8 March 1963	11 May 1963	63 days	Independent	al-Bitar I
6	Ziad al-Hariri	Major General; Ziad al-Hariri (1929–2015)	11 May 1963	4 August 1963	85 days	Independent	al-Bitar I–II
7	Abdullah Ziyada	Major General; Abdullah Ziyada (1915–1998)	4 August 1963	14 May 1964	284 days	Independent	al-Bitar III al-Hafiz I
8	Mamdouh Jaber [ar]	Major General; Mamdouh Jaber (born 1928)	14 May 1964	23 September 1965	1 year, 132 days	Ba'ath Party	al-Bitar IV al-Hafiz II
9	Hamad Ubayd [ar]	Major General; Hamad Ubayd (born 1928)	23 September 1965	27 December 1965	95 days	Ba'ath Party	Zuayyin I
10	Muhammad Umran	Major General; Muhammad Umran (1922–1972)	1 January 1966	23 February 1966	53 days	Ba'ath Party	al-Bitar V
11	Hafez al-Assad	Major General; Hafez al-Assad (1930–2000)	23 February 1966	17 March 1971	5 years, 22 days	Ba'ath Party	Zuayyin II al-Atassi al-Assad
12	Mustafa Tlass	Colonel General; Mustafa Tlass (1932–2017)	22 March 1972	12 May 2004	32 years, 51 days	Ba'ath Party	Khleifawi I [...] al-Otari
13	Hasan Turkmani	Lieutenant General; Hasan Turkmani (1935–2012)	12 May 2004	3 June 2009	5 years, 22 days	Ba'ath Party	al-Otari
14	Ali Habib Mahmud	Colonel General; Ali Habib Mahmud (1939–2020)	3 June 2009	8 August 2011	2 years, 66 days	Ba'ath Party	al-Otari; Safar
15	Dawoud Rajiha	Colonel General; Dawoud Rajiha (1947–2012)	8 August 2011	18 July 2012 †	345 days	Ba'ath Party	Safar; Hijab
16	Fahd Jassem al-Freij	Colonel General; Fahd Jassem al-Freij (born 1950)	18 July 2012	1 January 2018	5 years, 167 days	Ba'ath Party	Hijab al-Halqi I–II; Khamis
17	Ali Abdullah Ayyoub	Lieutenant General; Ali Abdullah Ayyoub (born 1952)	1 January 2018	28 April 2022	4 years, 117 days	Ba'ath Party	Khamis; Arnous I–II
18	Ali Mahmoud Abbas	Lieutenant General; Ali Mahmoud Abbas (born 1964)	28 April 2022	8 December 2024	2 years, 224 days	Ba'ath Party	Arnous II al-Jalali

=== Transitional period (2024–present) ===
No.	Portrait	Name (Birth–Death)	Term of office			Political party	Government
No.	Portrait	Name (Birth–Death)	Took office	Left office	Time in office	Political party	Government
1		Major General; Murhaf Abu Qasra (born 1984)	21 December 2024	Incumbent	1 year, 305 days	HTS (until 29 January 2025)	Caretaker (until 29 March 2025)
1		Major General; Murhaf Abu Qasra (born 1984)	21 December 2024	Incumbent	1 year, 305 days	Independent	Transitional

== Military intelligence agencies ==
=== Ba'athist Syria ===
- Military Intelligence Directorate
- Air Force Intelligence Directorate

=== Current ===
- General Intelligence Service

== See also ==
- Government of Syria
