= Ministry of Foreign Affairs and Expatriates (Syria) =

Cabinet ministry of Syria responsible for foreign relations

- وزارة الخارجية والمغتربين; Wizārat al-Khārijīyah wa-al-Mughtaribīn
- Logo

- Horizontal logo

- Flag

Agency overview
- Formed: 1920; 106 years ago
- Preceding agency: Ministry of Expatriates
- Jurisdiction: Syria and its diplomatic missions worldwide
- Headquarters: Kafr Sousa, Damascus
- Minister responsible: Asaad al-Shaibani
- Website: mofaex.gov.sy

The Ministry of Foreign Affairs and Expatriates (Arabic: وزارة الخارجية والمغتربين, romanized: Wizārat al-Khārijīyah wa-al-Mughtaribīn) is a cabinet ministry of Syria, responsible for conducting foreign relations of the country. The ministry oversees the expression of Syrian foreign policy, the protection of the interests of Syria and the interests of Syrian citizens abroad, as well as the representation of the country to other countries and international organizations. The responsibilities of the Ministry of Expatriates were merged on 14 April 2011.

The current minister is Asaad al-Shaibani who was appointed on 21 December 2024 following the collapse of the Ba'athist regime.

== List of ministers of foreign affairs ==
The following is a list of foreign ministers of Syria since 1920:

=== Arab Kingdom of Syria (1918–1920) ===
- (1920) Awni Abd al-Hadi
- (1920) Abd al-Rahman Shahbandar
- (1920) Aladdin al-Droubi

=== French Mandate for Syria and First Syrian Republic (1930–1950) ===
- (1936–1939) Saadallah al-Jabiri
- (1939) Fayez al-Khoury
- (1939) Khalid al-Azm
- (1941–1943) Fayez al-Khoury
- (1943) Naim Antaki
- (1943–1945) Jamil Mardam Bey
- (1945) Mikhail Ilyan
- (1945–1946) Saadallah al-Jabiri
- (1946–1947) Naim Antaki
- (1947–1948) Jamil Mardam Bey
- (1948) Muhsin al-Barazi
- (1948–1949) Khalid al-Azm
- (1949) Adil Arslan
- (1949) Muhsin al-Barazi
- (1949) Nazim al-Kudsi
- (1949–1950) Khalid al-Azm

=== Second Syrian Republic (1950–1958) ===
- (1950–1951) Nazim al-Kudsi
- (1951) Khalid al-Azm
- (1951) Faydi al-Atassi
- (1951) Shakir al-As
- (1952–1953) Zafir ar-Rifai
- (1953–1954) Khalil Mardam Bey
- (1954 Faydi al-Atassi
- (1954) Izzat Sakkal
- (1954–1955) Faydi al-Atassi
- (1955) Khalid al-Azm
- (1955–1956) Said al-Ghazzi
- (1956–1958) Salah al-Din al-Bitar

=== United Arab Republic (1958–1961) ===
- (1958–1961) Mahmoud Fawzi

=== Syrian Arab Republic (1961–1963) ===
- (1961) Maamun al-Kuzbari
- (1961) Izzat al-Nuss
- (1961–1962) Maarouf al-Dawalibi
- (1962) Adnan Azhari
- (1962) Jamal al-Farra
- (1962–1963) Assad Mahassen

=== Ba'athist Syria (1963–2024) ===
Portrait	Name (Birth–Death)	Term of office			Political party	Government
Portrait	Name (Birth–Death)	Took office	Left office	Time in office	Political party	Government
	Salah al-Din al-Bitar (1912–1980)	1963	1963		Ba'ath Party	al-Bitar I–III
	Hassan Mraywed	1963	1965	2 years	Ba'ath Party	al-Hafiz I al-Bitar IV al-Hafiz II
	Ibrahim Makhous (1925–2013)	22 September 1965	21 December 1965	90 days	Ba'ath Party	Zuayyin I
	Salah al-Din al-Bitar (1912–1980)	21 December 1965	1 March 1966	70 days	Ba'ath Party	al-Bitar V
	Ibrahim Makhous (1925–2013)	1 March 1966	29 October 1968	2 years, 242 days	Ba'ath Party	Zuayyin II
	Muhammad Eid Ashawi	1968	1969	1 year	Ba'ath Party	al-Atassi
	Mustapha al-Said	1969	1970	1 year	Ba'ath Party	al-Atassi
	Abdul Halim Khaddam (1932–2020)	5 July 1970	1 March 1984	13 years, 240 days	Ba'ath Party	al-Atassi [...] al-Kasm I
	Farouk al-Sharaa (born 1938)	1 March 1984	21 February 2006	21 years, 357 days	Ba'ath Party	al-Kasm II [...] al-Otari
	Walid Muallem (1941–2020)	21 February 2006	16 November 2020	14 years, 269 days	Ba'ath Party	al-Otari [...] Arnous I
	Faisal Mekdad (born 1954)	22 November 2020	23 September 2024	3 years, 306 days	Ba'ath Party	Arnous I–II
	Bassam al-Sabbagh (born 1969)	23 September 2024	10 December 2024	78 days	Ba'ath Party	al-Jalali

=== Transitional period (2024–present) ===
Portrait	Name (Birth–Death)	Term of office			Political party	Government
Portrait	Name (Birth–Death)	Took office	Left office	Time in office	Political party	Government
	Asaad al-Shaibani (born 1987)	21 December 2024	Incumbent	1 year, 305 days	HTS (until 29 January 2025)	Caretaker (until 29 March 2025)
	Asaad al-Shaibani (born 1987)	21 December 2024	Incumbent	1 year, 305 days	Independent	Transitional

== See also ==
- Foreign relations of Syria
- President of Syria
  - List of presidents of Syria
- Speaker of the People's Assembly of Syria
- Government of Syria
