= Ministry of Internal Trade and Consumer Protection =

Government ministry of Syria

Ministry of Industry, Internal Trade and Consumer Protection
- وزارة الصناعة والتجارة الداخلية وحماية المستهلك
- Emblem of Syria

Agency overview
- Formed: 1920, 2012, 2026 (latest form)
- Preceding agency: Ministry of Supply and Internal Trade Ministry of Economy and Industry
- Jurisdiction: Government of Syria
- Headquarters: Damascus
- Minister responsible: Basel Abdul Hannan
- Website: www.miitcp.gov.sy

The Ministry of Industry, Internal Trade and Consumer Protection (Arabic: وزارة الصناعة والتجارة الداخلية وحماية المستهلك, romanized: Wizarat Alsinaeat Waltijarat Aldaakhiliat Wahimayat Almustahlik) is a ministry of the Syrian government. On 29 March 2025, the Ministry of Internal Trade and Consumer Protection, the Ministry of Economy and Foreign Trade and the Ministry of Industry were merged to become the Ministry of Economy and Industry. though would seemingly be reversed on 18 October 2026.

== History ==
It was established in 2012 after a series of amendments to the name and tasks. Interest in internal trade in Syria began in 1960, when the Ministry of Supply was established by Law No. 122 of 1960. The new ministry was entrusted with supply affairs in general and in particular: By providing food, clothing, health supplies and all other supply needs under the best conditions and at the most appropriate prices, In ensuring the transfer of these materials from the producer or importer to the consumer at the lowest costs, By providing important local services at reasonable costs and By implementing laws and regulations related to supplies, suppressing fraud, monopoly and seizure, regulating the possession and trade of food supplies, and other matters related to the Ministry's work.

== Responsibility ==
- Developing plans and strategies to secure the country's need for basic materials.
- Developing policies to regulate domestic markets and amending the systems and tasks of affiliated companies and institutions.
- Taking the necessary measures to address emergency cases.
- Implementing the state’s policy on pricing matters.
- Protecting consumer rights.
- Organizing and granting commercial registration and licensing transactions for commercial institutions, companies and their branches.
- Regulating the work of protecting commercial and industrial property and granting trademarks, industrial designs and models, and patents.
- Supervising the work of consumer cooperatives and their unions.
- Supervising the Federation of Chambers of Commerce and its affiliated chambers.

== List of Ministers for Internal Trade and Consumer Protection ==
- Talal Al-Barazi (11 May 2020 – 31 July 2021)
- Amr Salem (10 August 2021 – 29 March 2023)
- Louai Imad al-Munajjid
- Maher Khalil al-Hasan (December 2024 – 29 March 2025)
- Basel Abdul Hannan (18 October 2026 – present)
