= Prime Minister of Syria =

Head of government of Syria (1920–2025)

President of the Council of Ministers of the Syrian Arab Republic
- Arabic: رئيس مجلس وزراء الجمهورية العربية السورية
- Seal of the Prime Minister of Syria

- Flag of Syria

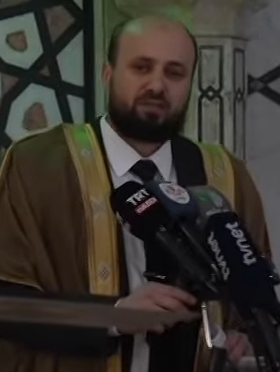
- Last served Mohammed al-Bashir; 10 December 2024 – 29 March 2025
- Cabinet of Syria; Executive branch of the Syrian Government
- Style: Mr Prime Minister (informal); His Excellency (diplomatic)
- Type: Head of government
- Status: Abolished
- Member of: Cabinet of Syria
- Residence: Damascus, Syria
- Appointer: President
- Inaugural holder: Ali Rikabi (kingdom); Saadallah al-Jabiri (republic)
- Formation: 9 March 1920; 106 years ago
- Final holder: Mohammed al-Bashir
- Abolished: 29 March 2025; 17 months ago
- Superseded by: President of Syria (2025–present)
- Deputy: Deputy Prime Minister
- Website: www.pministry.gov.sy

The prime minister of Syria (Arabic: رئيس وزراء سوريا, romanized: Raʾīs wuzarāʾ Sūriyā), officially the president of the Council of Ministers of the Syrian Arab Republic, was the head of government of Syria from 1920 to 2025. After the fall of the Ba'athist-led regime, the prime minister of Syria briefly served as the head of the Syrian caretaker government. The office was abolished following the establishment of the Syrian transitional government, after which the president of Syria assumed the roles of both head of state and head of government.

Mohammed al-Bashir served as the last prime minister of Syria and as head of the Syrian caretaker government from 10 December 2024 to 29 March 2025.

== History ==
=== Ba'athist Syria (1963–2024) ===
In normal circumstances and under the constitution of the Syrian Arab Republic, the prime minister was appointed by the president of Syria, along with other ministers and members of the government that the new prime minister recommended.

The People's Assembly of Syria then approved the legislative program of the new government, before the new government formally took office.

There was no constitutional limits on a prime minister's term, and several served multiple non-consecutive terms. The Syrian presidency retains the constitutional authority to appoint or remove the prime minister and his Council of Ministers.

=== Post-Ba'athist Syria (2024–2025) ===
With the 2012 Constitution of Ba'athist Syria suspended following the fall of the Assad regime, the new Constitutional Declaration of the Syrian Arab Republic establishes a presidential system in which executive power is concentrated in the hands of the president of the republic, who appoints the ministers without the position of prime minister.

On 29 March 2025, the Syrian transitional government was announced by Syrian President Ahmed al-Sharaa at a ceremony at the Presidential Palace in Damascus, in which the new ministers were sworn in and delivered speeches outlining their agendas. The government replaced the Syrian caretaker government, which was formed following the fall of the Assad regime. The post of prime minister was abolished.

== See also ==
- List of prime ministers of Syria
- Deputy Prime Minister of Syria
- Government of Syria
