= List of members of the Chamber of Deputies (Syria), 1954–1958 =

This is a list of deputies elected to the 6th Chamber of Deputies, following the 1954 parliamentary election.

== Deputies ==
No.	Electoral district	Name	Party
1	Damascus Municipality	Khalid al-Azm	Independent
2	Damascus Municipality	Khalid Bakdash	Syrian Communist Party
3	Damascus Municipality	Sabri al-Asali	National Party
4	Damascus Municipality	Munir al-Ajlani	Independent
5	Damascus Municipality	Suhail al-Khoury	National Party
6	Damascus Municipality	Rashad Jabri	People's Party
7	Damascus Municipality	Said al-Ghazzi	Independent
8	Damascus Municipality	Maamun al-Kuzbari	Independent
9	Damascus Municipality	Ali Bozo	People's Party
10	Damascus Municipality	Muhammad al-Mubarak	Muslim Brotherhood
11	Damascus Municipality	Faisal al-Asali	Socialist Cooperation Party
12	Damascus Municipality	Salah al-Din al-Bitar	Ba'ath Party
13	Damascus Municipality	George Shalhub	People's Party
14	Markaz Damascus (The Ghoutas)	Abd al-Rauf Abu Tawq	Muslim Brotherhood
15	Markaz Damascus (The Ghoutas)	Muhammad al-Qahwaji	
16	Markaz Damascus (The Ghoutas)	Hanna al-Kaswani	
17	Douma	Subhi Taha	
18	Douma	Ahmad Ismail	Arab Liberation Movement
19	Douma	Farzat al-Mamluk	
20	Al-Nabek	Abd al-Halim Qaddur	
21	Al-Nabek	Salih Aqil	
22	Al-Qutayfah	Muhammad Mahmoud Diab	
23	Quneitra	Faour al-Faour	Independent
24	Quneitra	Abd al-Razzaq al-Tahhan	Independent
25	Qatana	Hussein Maryud	Ba'ath Party
26	Qatana	Adil al-Ajlani	National Party
27	Al-Zabadani	Jamil al-Shammat	Independent
28	Aleppo	Mustafa al-Zarqa	Independent
29	Aleppo	Majd al-Din al-Jabri	National Party
30	Aleppo	Nazim al-Qudsi	People's Party
31	Aleppo	Maarouf al-Dawalibi	People's Party
32	Aleppo	Abdul-Wahab Hawmad	People's Party
33	Aleppo	Rushdi al-Kikhya	People's Party
34	Aleppo	Mikhail Ilyan	National Party
35	Aleppo	Leon Zamarya	National Party
36	Aleppo	Rizqallah Salim	
37	Aleppo	Ihsan al-Jabri	National Party
38	Aleppo	Rashad Barmada	People's Party
39	Aleppo	Ahmad Qanbar	People's Party
40	Aleppo	Dikran Jerajian	People's Party
41	Aleppo	Rizqallah al-Antaki	People's Party
42	Mount Simeon	Hussein al-Shaabani	
43	Mount Simeon	Turki bin Mujhim bin Miheid	
44	Mount Simeon	Abd al-Aziz al-Hallaj	People's Party
45	Mount Simeon	Hasan Abd al-Karim	
46	Idlib	Abd al-Hamid al-Dweidari	People's Party
47	Idlib	Qadri al-Mufti	
48	Idlib	Ghalib al-Ayyashi	
49	Manbij	Diab al-Mashi	People's Party
50	Manbij	Muhammad Shaykh Fasih al-Ghanim	
51	Harem	Ahmad Fakhr Kayyali	
52	Harem	Adil al-Kikhya	
53	Jarabulus	Zaki al-Mudarris	
54	Jisr ash-Shughur	Najdat al-Najjari	National Party
55	Jisr ash-Shughur	Abd al-Majid Rustum	
56	Al-Bab	Shukri Rahmu al-Shihabi	
57	Al-Bab	Jamil Khalu	
58	Azaz	Nafi' Bakkar	People's Party
59	Azaz	Ahmad Hasan Kannu	People's Party
60	Ayn al-Arab	Shahin Mustafa Shahin	
61	Afrin	Faiq Manan Shaykh Ismail Zadeh	
62	Afrin	Ahmad Jaafar Shaykh Ismail Zadeh	People's Party
63	Afrin	Izzat Khalil Agha	
64	Maarat al-Numan	Hasan Munib al-Youssefi	
65	Maarat al-Numan	Nur al-Din al-Najm	
66	Latakia City	Asaad Harun	National Party
67	Latakia City	Nawfal Ilyas	
68	Latakia District	Wahib al-Ghanim	Ba'ath Party
69	Latakia District	Muhammad Rashid Suleiman	
70	Al-Haffah	Aziz Abbad	
71	Al-Haffah	Nuri al-Hajji	
72	Jableh	Uthman Hasan Esber	People's Party
73	Jableh	Bahjat Nassur	
74	Jableh	Muhammad Suleiman al-Ahmad	National Party
75	Baniyas	Mahmoud Habib	Independent
76	Baniyas	Adnan Khaddam	
77	Tartus	Badi' Ismail	Independent
78	Tartus	Ali Yunus	
79	Safita	Muhammad Amin Raslan	Independent
80	Safita	Abd al-Latif al-Yunis	National Party
81	Safita	Rafiq Bashur	People's Party
82	Deir ez-Zor	Nafi' Rajab	
83	Deir ez-Zor	Abd al-Samad al-Futayh	Independent
84	Deir ez-Zor	Raghib al-Bashir	Independent
85	Deir ez-Zor	Muhammad al-Ayish	Independent
86	Deir ez-Zor	Badri al-Abboud	Independent
87	Mayadin	Abboud al-Jadaan	Independent
88	Mayadin	Abd al-Wahhab al-Khidr	
89	Abu Kamal	Dahham al-Dandal	Independent
90	Abu Kamal	Fahd al-Dandal	
91	Raqqa	Faisal al-Huwaydi	Independent
92	Raqqa	Hamid al-Khoja	Independent
93	Raqqa	Anwar Rakan	
94	Homs	Faydi al-Atassi	People's Party
95	Homs	Adnan al-Atassi	People's Party
96	Homs	Hani al-Sibai	People's Party
97	Homs	Ratib al-Husami	People's Party
98	Homs	Suleiman al-Maasarani	
99	Homs	Musallam al-Haddad	People's Party
100	Homs	Abdallah Farkouh	National Party
101	Homs	Mahmoud Sweidan	
102	Homs	Abd al-Hasib Raslan	Independent
103	Homs	Farhan al-Jandali	People's Party
104	Talkalakh	Ali al-Dandashi	
105	Talkalakh	Esber al-Yaziji	
106	Hama	Akram al-Hourani	Ba'ath Party
107	Hama	Abd al-Karim Zuhur Addi	Ba'ath Party
108	Hama	Saad al-Din al-Khani	Ba'ath Party
109	Hama	Muhammad Faisal al-Rukbi	Ba'ath Party
110	Hama	Raif al-Malqi	Independent
111	Hama	Khalil al-Kallas	Ba'ath Party
112	Salamiyah	Mustafa Mirza	Independent
113	Salamiyah	Mustafa Tamer	Independent
114	Masyaf	Jihad al-Hawwash	
115	Masyaf	Abd al-Hadi Abbas	Ba'ath Party
116	Al-Hasakah	Abd al-Aziz al-Maslat	
117	Al-Hasakah	Lutfi al-Hajj Hussein	
118	Al-Hasakah	Hawwash bin Jamil al-Maslat	
119	Al-Hasakah	Hakob Amsih Marshu	
120	Tigris	Uwaynan al-Madlul	
121	Qamishli	Abd al-Baqi Nizam ad-Din	People's Party
122	Qamishli	Fouad Qadri Jamil Pasha	
123	Qamishli	Abd al-Razzaq al-Nayef	Independent
124	Qamishli	Ilyas Najjar	Independent
125	Daraa	Mazid al-Fadil al-Muhamid	
126	Daraa	Abd al-Latif al-Miqdad	Independent
127	Izraa	Muhammad Khayr al-Hariri	National Party
128	Izraa	Muhammad Youssef Abu Rumiyya	
129	Al-Zawiya	Ahmad al-Hussein al-Muhammad	
130	Suwayda	Hasan al-Atrash	Independent
131	Suwayda	Fadlallah Jarbu	
132	Salkhad	Mansur al-Atrash	Ba'ath Party
133	Shahba	Sayyah Aamer	
134	Tribes of the Aleppo Desert - Al-Mawali	Abd al-Ibrahim	
135	Tribes of the Aleppo Desert - Al-Hadidiyin	Faisal al-Nawwaf	
136	Jazira Bedouin Tribes - Shammar al-Kharsa	Dahham al-Hadi	
137	Jazira Bedouin Tribes - Shammar al-Zour	Humaydi al-Abd al-Karim	
138	Deir ez-Zor desert tribes	Nuri bin Miheid	
139	Tribes of the Syrian desert and al-Hasna	Mut'ib al-Shaalan	
140	Tribes of the Syrian desert and al-Hasna	Tamer al-Mulhim	
141	Tribes of Jabal al-Druze desert	Hayil al-Surur	
142	Tadmur Bedouin Tribes - Homs and Hama	Rakan al-Murshid	

== By-elections ==
Electoral district	Date	Previous incumbent	Party	Winner	Party	Cause
Suwayda	February 1955	Fadlallah Jarbu		Fadlallah Jarbu		Election was invalidated by the Supreme Court on 5 December 1954.
Latakia City	25 and 26 February 1955	Muhammad Asaad Harun		Muhammad Asaad Harun		Election was invalidated by the Supreme Court on 13 December 1954.
Latakia City	25 and 26 February 1955	Nawfal Ilyas		Nawfal Ilyas		Election was invalidated by the Supreme Court on 13 December 1954.
Al-Zawiya	February 1955	Ahmad al-Hussein al-Muhammad		Ahmad al-Hussein al-Muhammad		Elections in some polling stations were invalidated by the Supreme Court on 26 December 1954.
The Ghoutas	February 1955	Muhammad Abu Khayr al-Qahwaji		Mazhar ash-Sharbaji	National Party	Election was invalidated by the Supreme Court on 26 January 1955.
Tigris	March 1955	Uwaynan al-Madlul		Uwaynan al-Madlul		Election was invalidated by the Supreme Court on 10 January 1955.
Al-Qutayfah	12 March 1955	Muhammad Mahmoud Diab		Muhammad Mahmoud Diab		Election was invalidated by the Supreme Court on 12 January 1955.
Izraa	March 1955	Muhammad Youssef Abu Rumiyya		Muhammad Youssef Abu Rumiyya		Elections in some polling stations were invalidated by the Supreme Court on 22 January 1955.
Manbij	11 March 1955	Diab al-Mashi	People's Party	Diab al-Mashi	People's Party	Election was invalidated by the Supreme Court on 27 January 1955.
Manbij	11 March 1955	Muhammad Shaykh Fasih al-Ghanim		Muhammad Shaykh Fasih al-Ghanim		Election was invalidated by the Supreme Court on 27 January 1955.
Tartus	25 and 26 March 1955	Badi' Ismail	Independent	Ismail Hussein		Election was invalidated by the Supreme Court on 30 January 1955.
Tartus	25 and 26 March 1955	Ali Yunus		Riyad Abd al-Razzaq	National Party	Election was invalidated by the Supreme Court on 30 January 1955.
Quneitra	25 and 26 March 1955	Faour al-Faour	Independent	Faour al-Faour	Independent	Elections in some polling stations were invalidated by the Supreme Court on 13 February 1955.
Quneitra	25 and 26 March 1955	Abd al-Razzaq al-Tahhan	Independent	Abd al-Razzaq al-Tahhan	Independent	Elections in some polling stations were invalidated by the Supreme Court on 13 February 1955.
Al-Hasakah	25 and 26 March 1955	Abd al-Aziz al-Maslat		Abd al-Aziz al-Maslat		Elections in some polling stations were invalidated by the Supreme Court on 14 February 1955.
Al-Hasakah	25 and 26 March 1955	Muhammad Lutfi al-Hajj Hussein		Muhammad Lutfi al-Hajj Hussein		Elections in some polling stations were invalidated by the Supreme Court on 14 February 1955.
Al-Hasakah	25 and 26 March 1955	Hawwash bin Jamil al-Maslat		Muhammad Ismail Ibrahim		Elections in some polling stations were invalidated by the Supreme Court on 14 February 1955.
Al-Hasakah	25 and 26 March 1955	Hagop Amsih Marshu		Hagop Amsih Marshu		Elections in some polling stations were invalidated by the Supreme Court on 14 February 1955.
The Ghoutas	April 1955	Hanna al-Kaswani		Hanna al-Kaswani		By-election in some polling stations were invalidated by the Supreme Court on 2 February 1955.
The Ghoutas	22 and 23 July 1955	Mazhar ash-Sharbaji	National Party	Mazhar ash-Sharbaji	National Party	By-election was invalidated by the Supreme Court on 20 June 1955.
Al-Qutayfah	14 August 1955	Muhammad Mahmoud Diab		Muhammad Mahmoud Diab		By-election was invalidated by the Supreme Court on 3 July 1955.
Tartus	2 September 1955	Riyad Abd al-Razzaq	National Party	Riyad Abd al-Razzaq	National Party	By-election in some polling stations was invalidated by the Supreme Court on 23 July 1955.
Tartus	9 October 1955	Ismail Hussein		Muhyi al-Din Murhij	National Party	By-election was invalidated by the Supreme Court on 23 July 1955.
Homs	November 1955	Suleiman al-Maasarani		Ahmad al-Hajj Yunis		Death.
Damascus	4 and 5 May 1957	Munir al-Ajlani	Independent	Riyad al-Malki	Ba'ath Party	The deputy was found guilty of treason and sentenced to death or life imprisonment as part of the aftermath of Operation Straggle, and thus lost his seat in the Chamber.
Homs	4 and 5 May 1957	Adnan al-Atassi	People's Party	Kamal Kalalib	Syrian Communist Party	The deputy was found guilty of treason and sentenced to death or life imprisonment as part of the aftermath of Operation Straggle, and thus lost his seat in the Chamber.
Suwayda	4 and 5 May 1957	Fadlallah Jarbu		Sayyah Abu Asali		The deputy was found guilty of treason and sentenced to death or life imprisonment as part of the aftermath of Operation Straggle, and thus lost his seat in the Chamber.
Tribes of Jabal al-Druze desert	4 and 5 May 1957	Hayil al-Surur		Dhaar al-Jumah	Ba'ath Party	The deputy was found guilty of treason and sentenced to death or life imprisonment as part of the aftermath of Operation Straggle, and thus lost his seat in the Chamber.
Aleppo	25 October 1957	Mikhail Ilyan	National Party	Antoine Hamed		The deputy was found guilty of treason and sentenced to death or life imprisonment as part of the aftermath of Operation Straggle, and thus lost his seat in the Chamber.
Suwayda	25 October 1957	Hasan al-Atrash	Independent	Salman al-Hunaidi	Ba'ath Party	The deputy was found guilty of treason and sentenced to death or life imprisonment as part of the aftermath of Operation Straggle, and thus lost his seat in the Chamber.
Masyaf	20 and 21 December 1957	Jihad al-Hawwash		Qahtan al-Hawwash	Ba'ath Party	
