= 6th Chamber of Deputies of Syria (1954–1958) =

Legislative term of Syria's parliament from 1954 to 1958

6th Chamber of Deputies
←	5th	National Assembly	→

Overview
- Legislative body: Chamber of Deputies
- Jurisdiction: Syria
- Meeting place: Chamber of Deputies Building, Damascus
- Term: 14 October 1954 – 22 February 1958
- Election: 1954
- Government: al-Khoury IV (until 13 February 1955); al-Asali II (13 February – 13 September 1955); al-Ghazzi II (13 September – 14 June 1955); al-Asali III (14 June 1955 – 31 December 1956); al-Asali IV (from 31 December 1956)
- Members: 142
- Speaker: Nazim al-Qudsi (People's Party) (until 1 October 1957); Akram al-Hourani (Ba'ath Party) (from 14 October 1957)

Sessions
- 1st: 14 October – 21 December 1954
- 2nd: 1 March – 15 May 1955
- 3rd: 1 October – 21 December 1955
- 4th: 1 March – 29 April 1956
- 5th: ? – ?
- 6th: 2 March – 15 May 1957
- 7th: 14 October – 21 December 1957

Special sessions
- 1st: 3 January – 24 February 1955
- 2nd: 16 May – 24 September 1955
- 3rd: 9 January – 29 February 1956
- 4th: 9 June – 4 August 1956
- 5th: 3 January – 8 February 1957
- 6th: 27 May – 1 August 1957
- 7th: 5–22 February 1958

The Sixth Chamber of Deputies (Arabic: مجلس النواب للدور الاشتراعي السادس, romanized: Majlis al-Nuwwāb lil-dawr al-ishtirāʻī al-sādis) was the parliament of the Syrian Republic from 1954 to 1958. It was elected following the 1954 Syrian parliamentary election, widely regarded as one of the most democratic elections in Syria's history.

The Chamber operated during a period of restored constitutional life after the fall of Adib Shishakli and played a key role in shaping Syria's parliamentary democracy, including the approval of the union with Egypt in 1958.

The Chamber was dissolved on 22 February 1958 following the formation of the United Arab Republic between Syria and Egypt.

== Background ==
On 24 February 1954, President Adib Shishakli resigned and fled the country amid mounting opposition. Following his departure, constitutional life was restored, and Hashim al-Atassi resumed the presidency.

The 1950 Constitution was reinstated (with some amendments), replacing the presidential system imposed in 1953. Despite ongoing political instability and regional pressures, Syria entered a renewed democratic phase.

On 15 March 1954, the parliament elected in 1949 resumed its work until new elections could be held.

== Election ==
Parliamentary elections were held on 25 September 1954 under a revised electoral law.

The elections are considered a landmark democratic experience in Syria and the wider Arab world. They introduced the secret ballot system for the first time in the region.

The resulting chamber consisted of 144 deputies representing multiple political forces. Notably, Khalid Bakdash became the first communist elected to a parliament in the Arab world.

== Bureau ==
Position	Name	Party	Tenure
Speaker	Nazim al-Qudsi	People's Party	14 October 1954 – 13 October 1957
Speaker	Akram al-Hourani	Ba'ath Party	14 October 1957 – 22 February 1958
Deputy Speaker	Rafiq Bashur	People's Party	14 October 1954 – 22 February 1958
Deputy Speaker	Abd al-Samad al-Futayh	Independent	14 October 1954 – 13 October 1957
Deputy Speaker	Nafi' Rajab		14 October 1957 – 22 February 1958
Secretary	Abd al-Latif al-Yunis	National Party	14 October 1954 – 13 October 1957
Secretary	Adil al-Kikhya		14 October 1954 – 30 September 1955
Secretary	Ratib al-Husami	People's Party	1 October 1955 – 22 February 1958
Secretary	Abd al-Majid Rustum	National Party	14 October 1957 – 22 February 1958
Overseer	Najdat al-Najjari	National Party	14 October 1954 – 30 September 1955
Overseer	Hayil al-Surur	Independent	14 October 1954 – 13 October 1957
Overseer	Shukri Rahmu al-Shihabi		14 October 1954 – 30 September 1955
Overseer	Uthman Hasan Esber	People's Party	1 October 1955 – 5 October 1956
Overseer	Shahin Mustafa Shahin		1 October 1955 – 22 February 1958
Overseer	Ahmad Hasan Kannu	People's Party	6 October 1956 – 13 October 1957
Overseer	Ahmad Ismail	Arab Liberation Movement	14 October 1957 – 22 February 1958
Overseer	Mahmoud Habib	Independent	14 October 1957 – 22 February 1958

== Elections of the Bureau ==
=== 14 October 1954 ===
The Chamber of Deputies elected its bureau on the first sitting of the first ordinary session on 14 October 1954.

Election of the Speaker
Candidate	Party	Votes	%
Nazim al-Qudsi	People's Party	78	54.93
Said al-Ghazzi	Independent	34	23.94
Different candidates		10	7.04
Total		122	100.00
Valid votes		122	87.77
Invalid/blank votes		17	12.23
Total votes		139	100.00
Registered voters/turnout		142	97.89

Election of the Deputy Speakers
Candidate	Party	First round		Second round	
Candidate	Party	Votes	%	Votes	%
Rafiq Bashur	People's Party	95	68.35		
Abd al-Samad al-Futayh	Independent	66	47.48	78	57.78
Muhammad al-Mubarak	Muslim Brotherhood	49	35.25	57	42.22
Mustafa al-Zarqa	Independent	9	6.47		
Khalid Bakdash	Syrian Communist Party	2	1.44		
Total		221	100.00	135	100.00
Valid votes		133	95.68	133	98.52
Invalid/blank votes		6	4.32	2	1.48
Total votes		139	100.00	135	100.00
Registered voters/turnout		142	97.89	142	95.07

Election of the Secretaries
Candidate	Party	Votes	%
Abd al-Latif al-Yunis	National Party	101	74.26
Adil al-Kikhya	Independent	97	71.32
Total		198	100.00
Valid votes		124	91.18
Invalid/blank votes		12	8.82
Total votes		136	100.00
Registered voters/turnout		142	95.77

Election of the Overseers
Candidate	Party	First round		Second round	
Candidate	Party	Votes	%	Votes	%
Najdat al-Najjari	National Party	69	50.74		
Hayil al-Surur	Independent	44	32.35	52	38.24
Shahin Mustafa Shahin		42	30.88	39	28.68
Shukri Rahmu al-Shihabi		35	25.74	40	29.41
Abd al-Wahhab al-Khidr		35	25.74	31	22.79
Ahmad Ismail	Arab Liberation Movement	28	20.59	29	21.32
Abd al-Hamid al-Dweidari	People's Party	25	18.38	25	18.38
Total		278	100.00	216	100.00
Valid votes		119	87.50		
Invalid/blank votes		17	12.50		
Total votes		136	100.00	136	–
Registered voters/turnout		142	95.77	142	95.77

=== 1 October 1955 ===
The Chamber of Deputies reelected its bureau on the first sitting of the third ordinary session on 1 October 1955.

Election of the Speaker
Candidate	Party	Votes	%
Nazim al-Qudsi	People's Party	94	66.20
Abd al-Razzaq al-Tahhan	Independent	1	0.70
Total		95	100.00
Valid votes		95	75.40
Invalid/blank votes		31	24.60
Total votes		126	100.00
Registered voters/turnout		142	88.73

Election of the Deputy Speakers
Candidate	Party	Votes	%
Rafiq Bashur	People's Party	76	69.72
Abd al-Samad al-Futayh	Independent	66	60.55
Total		142	100.00
Valid votes		83	76.15
Invalid/blank votes		26	23.85
Total votes		109	100.00
Registered voters/turnout		142	76.76

Election of the Secretaries
Candidate	Party	Votes	%
Ratib al-Husami	People's Party	69	63.30
Abd al-Latif al-Yunis	National Party	68	62.39
Total		137	100.00
Valid votes		109	100.00
Invalid/blank votes		0	0.00
Total votes		109	100.00
Registered voters/turnout		142	76.76

Election of the Overseers
Candidate	Party	First round		Second round	
Candidate	Party	Votes	%	Votes	%
Hayil al-Surur		76	69.72		
Uthman Hasan Esber	People's Party	72	66.06		
Shahin Mustafa Shahin		51	46.79	79	77.45
Mahmoud Habib	Independent			17	16.67
Ghalib al-Ayyashi				10	9.80
Total		199	100.00	106	100.00
Valid votes		109	89.34	89	87.25
Invalid/blank votes		13	10.66	13	12.75
Total votes		122	100.00	102	100.00
Registered voters/turnout		142	85.92	142	71.83

=== 14 October 1957 ===
The Chamber of Deputies reelected its bureau on the first sitting of the seventh ordinary session on 14 October 1957.

Election of the Speaker
Candidate	Party	Votes	%
Akram al-Hourani	Ba'ath Party		
Total			
Registered voters/turnout		142	–

Election of the Deputy Speakers
Candidate	Party	Votes	%
Rafiq Bashur	People's Party	95	79.17
Nafi' Rajab		61	50.83
Abd al-Samad al-Futayh	Independent	59	49.17
Total		215	100.00
Valid votes		120	100.00
Invalid/blank votes		0	0.00
Total votes		120	100.00
Registered voters/turnout		142	84.51

Election of the Secretaries
Candidate	Party	Votes	%
Ratib al-Husami	People's Party	107	91.45
Abd al-Majid Rustum		66	56.41
Abd al-Latif al-Yunis	National Party	44	37.61
Total		217	100.00
Valid votes		116	99.15
Invalid/blank votes		1	0.85
Total votes		117	100.00
Registered voters/turnout		142	82.39

Election of the Overseers
Candidate	Party	Votes	%
Ahmad Ismail	Arab Liberation Movement	71	62.83
Shahin Mustafa Shahin		69	61.06
Mahmoud Habib	Independent	68	60.18
Uthman Hasan Esber	People's Party	46	40.71
Jamil Khalu		39	34.51
Total		293	100.00
Total votes		113	–
Registered voters/turnout		142	79.58

== Committees ==
=== 1st–2nd Ordinary Session and 1st–2nd Special ===
The Chamber's committees were elected for the first ordinary session on 23 October 1954. Deputies were divided into three parliamentary sections to elect the committee members. Between 26 October and 2 November, these committees elected their Bureaux as shown in the table below. Following the appointment of several committee members as ministers in the newly formed al-Khoury government and the successive governments, many resigned their committee seats, and replacements were elected.

Committees	Burea		Party
Agriculture Committee	Chair	Abd al-Aziz al-Hallaj	People's Party
Agriculture Committee	Vice-Chair	Saad al-Din al-Khani	Ba'ath Party
Agriculture Committee	Rapporteur	Rashad Barmada	People's Party
Budget Committee	Chair	Akram al-Hourani	Ba'ath Party
Budget Committee	Vice-Chair	Farzat al-Mamluk	
Budget Committee	Rapporteur	Rizqallah al-Antaki (until 10 Nov 1954)	People's Party
Budget Committee	Rapporteur	Maamun al-Kuzbari (11 Nov 1954 – 15 Mar 1955)	Independent
Budget Committee	Rapporteur	Hani al-Sibai (from 15 Mar 1955)	Independent
Constitution Committee	Chair	Suhail al-Khoury	National Party
Constitution Committee	Vice-Chair	Muhammad Lutfi al-Hajj Hussein	
Constitution Committee	Rapporteur	Abdul-Wahab Hawmad	People's Party
Education Committee	Chair	Abdul-Wahab Hawmad	People's Party
Education Committee	Vice-Chair	Subhi Taha	
Education Committee	Rapporteur	Abd al-Karim Zuhur Addi	Ba'ath Party
Endowments Committee (Bureau elected on 8 Dec)	Chair	Hussein al-Shaabani	
Endowments Committee (Bureau elected on 8 Dec)	Vice-Chair	Muhammad al-Qahwaji	
Endowments Committee (Bureau elected on 8 Dec)	Rapporteur	Shukri Rahmu al-Shihabi	
Financial Laws Committee	Chair	Raif al-Malqi (until 15 Mar 1955)	Independent
Financial Laws Committee	Chair	Qadri al-Mufti (from 15 Mar 1955)	
Financial Laws Committee	Vice-Chair	Hussein Maryud	Ba'ath Party
Financial Laws Committee	Rapporteur	Qadri al-Mufti (until 15 Mar 1955)	
Financial Laws Committee	Rapporteur	Rizqallah Salim (from 15 Mar 1955)	
Foreign Affairs Committee	Chair	Ihsan al-Jabri	National Party
Foreign Affairs Committee	Vice-Chair	Hamid al-Khoja (until 3 April 1955)	Independent
Foreign Affairs Committee	Vice-Chair	Maarouf al-Dawalibi (from 4 April 1955)	People's Party
Foreign Affairs Committee	Rapporteur	Salah al-Din al-Bitar	Ba'ath Party
Health and Ambulance Committee	Chair	George Shalhub	People's Party
Health and Ambulance Committee	Vice-Chair	Subhi Taha	
Health and Ambulance Committee	Rapporteur	Muhammad Faisal al-Rukbi	Ba'ath Party
Interior Committee	Chair	Ahmad Qanbar	People's Party
Interior Committee	Vice-Chair	Abd al-Halim Qaddur	
Interior Committee	Rapporteur	Adil al-Kikhya	
Judicial Committee	Chair	Rashad Barmada (until 13 Dec 1954)	People's Party
Judicial Committee	Chair	Maamun al-Kuzbari (13 Dec 1954 – 15 Mar 1955)	Independent
Judicial Committee	Chair	Rafiq Bashur (from 15 Mar 1955)	People's Party
Judicial Committee	Vice-Chair	Mustafa al-Zarqa	Independent
Judicial Committee	Rapporteur	Khalil al-Kallas	Ba'ath Party
National Defense Committee	Chair	Dikran Jerajian	People's Party
National Defense Committee	Vice-Chair	Ghalib al-Ayyashi	
National Defense Committee	Rapporteur	Jihad al-Hawwash	
National Economy Committee	Chair	Maarouf al-Dawalibi	People's Party
National Economy Committee	Vice-Chair	Salih Aqil	
National Economy Committee	Rapporteur	Abd al-Hasib Raslan	Independent
Petitions Committee	Chair	Abd al-Hasib Raslan	Independent
Petitions Committee	Vice-Chair	Abd al-Latif al-Yunis	National Party
Petitions Committee	Rapporteur	Abd al-Latif al-Miqdad	Independent
Public Works Committee	Chair	Rashad Jabri	People's Party
Public Works Committee	Vice-Chair	Ahmad Ismail	Arab Liberation Movement
Public Works Committee	Rapporteur	Hussein al-Shaabani	
Tribes Committee	Chair	Nuri bin Miheid	
Tribes Committee	Vice-Chair	Mut'ib al-Shaalan	
Tribes Committee	Rapporteur	Abd al-Rauf Abu Tawq	Muslim Brotherhood

Additionally, a special, temporary committee tasked with revising the Chamber's rules of procedure was created during the first ordinary session. With the approval of the deputies, its members were appointed by the Speaker on 11 November 1954. The committee elected its Bureau on 5 December.

Committees	Burea		Party
Rules of Procedure Committee	Chair	Maamun al-Kuzbari	Independent
Rules of Procedure Committee	Vice-Chair	Abdul-Wahab Hawmad	People's Party
Rules of Procedure Committee	Rapporteur	Khalil al-Kallas	Ba'ath Party

The same committees elected in the first ordinary session continued their work during the first special session. However, a new permanent committee, the Petroleum Committee, was created. Its members were elected between 30 January and 1 February 1955. Its Bureau was elected 27 April.

Committees	Burea		Party
Petroleum Committee	Chair	Muhammad al-Ayish	Independent
Petroleum Committee	Vice-Chair	Ali Abd al-Karim al-Dandashi	
Petroleum Committee	Rapporteur	Muhammad al-Mubarak	Muslim Brotherhood

=== 3rd Ordinary Session ===
The Chamber's committees were elected for the third ordinary session on 2 and 3 October 1955. On 8 and 9 October, these committees elected their Bureaux as follows:

Committees	Burea		Party
Agriculture Committee	Chair	Abd al-Aziz al-Hallaj	People's Party
Agriculture Committee	Vice-Chair	Abd al-Hadi Abbas	Ba'ath Party
Agriculture Committee	Rapporteur	Abd al-Majid Rustum	
Budget Committee	Chair	Akram al-Hourani	Ba'ath Party
Budget Committee	Vice-Chair	Hani al-Sibai	Independent
Budget Committee	Rapporteur	Ahmad Qanbar	People's Party
Constitution Committee	Chair	Faydi al-Atassi	People's Party
Constitution Committee	Vice-Chair	Sabri al-Asali	National Party
Constitution Committee	Rapporteur	Khalil al-Kallas	Ba'ath Party
Education Committee	Chair	Muhammad al-Mubarak	Muslim Brotherhood
Education Committee	Vice-Chair	Ali Abd al-Karim al-Dandashi	
Education Committee	Rapporteur	Abd al-Karim Zuhur Addi	Ba'ath Party
Endowments Committee	Chair	Mustafa al-Zarqa	Independent
Endowments Committee	Vice-Chair	Abd al-Rauf Abu Tawq	Muslim Brotherhood
Endowments Committee	Rapporteur	Ahmad Ismail	Arab Liberation Movement
Financial Laws Committee	Chair	Qadri al-Mufti (until 13 Nov 1955)	
Financial Laws Committee	Chair	Raif al-Malqi (from 14 Nov 1955)	Independent
Financial Laws Committee	Vice-Chair	Abd al-Majid Rustum	
Financial Laws Committee	Rapporteur	Rizqallah Salim	
Foreign Affairs Committee	Chair	Ihsan al-Jabri	National Party
Foreign Affairs Committee	Vice-Chair	Maarouf al-Dawalibi	People's Party
Foreign Affairs Committee	Rapporteur	Salah al-Din al-Bitar	Ba'ath Party
Health and Ambulance Committee (Bureau elected on 11 Oct)	Chair	George Shalhub	People's Party
Health and Ambulance Committee (Bureau elected on 11 Oct)	Vice-Chair	Dikran Jerajian	People's Party
Health and Ambulance Committee (Bureau elected on 11 Oct)	Rapporteur	Subhi Taha	
Interior Committee	Chair	Ahmad Qanbar	People's Party
Interior Committee	Vice-Chair	Abd al-Halim Qaddur	
Interior Committee	Rapporteur	Aziz Abbad	
Judicial Committee	Chair	Rafiq Bashur	People's Party
Judicial Committee	Vice-Chair	Adil al-Ajlani	National Party
Judicial Committee	Rapporteur	Khalil al-Kallas	Ba'ath Party
National Defense Committee	Chair	Dikran Jerajian	People's Party
National Defense Committee	Vice-Chair	Ghalib al-Ayyashi	
National Defense Committee	Rapporteur	Adil al-Kikhya	
National Economy Committee	Chair	Maarouf al-Dawalibi	People's Party
National Economy Committee	Vice-Chair	Salih Aqil	
National Economy Committee	Rapporteur	Abd al-Hasib Raslan (until 25 Jul 1956)	Independent
National Economy Committee	Rapporteur	Ahmad al-Hajj Yunis (from 26 Jul 1956)	
Petitions Committee (Bureau elected on 8 Oct)	Chair	Abd al-Hasib Raslan	Independent
Petitions Committee (Bureau elected on 8 Oct)	Vice-Chair	Ahmad Ismail	Arab Liberation Movement
Petitions Committee (Bureau elected on 8 Oct)	Rapporteur	Abd al-Latif al-Yunis	National Party
Petroleum Committee (Bureau elected on 27 Nov)	Chair	Muhammad al-Ayish	Independent
Petroleum Committee (Bureau elected on 27 Nov)	Vice-Chair	Raif al-Malqi	Independent
Petroleum Committee (Bureau elected on 27 Nov)	Rapporteur	Abd al-Latif al-Yunis	National Party
Public Works Committee (Bureau elected on 8 Oct)	Chair	Majd al-Din al-Jabri	National Party
Public Works Committee (Bureau elected on 8 Oct)	Vice-Chair	Rashad Jabri	People's Party
Public Works Committee (Bureau elected on 8 Oct)	Rapporteur	Hasan Munib al-Youssefi	
Tribes Committee	Chair	Nuri bin Miheid	
Tribes Committee	Vice-Chair	Mut'ib al-Shaalan	
Tribes Committee	Rapporteur	Hayil al-Surur	

=== 7th Ordinary Session ===
The Chamber's committees were elected for the seventh ordinary session on 20 or 21 October 1957. On 22 October, these committees elected their Bureaux as follows:

Committees	Burea		Party
Agriculture Committee	Chair	Hussein al-Shaabani	
Agriculture Committee	Vice-Chair	Abd al-Latif al-Miqdad	Independent
Agriculture Committee	Rapporteur	Abd al-Majid Rustum	
Budget Committee	Chair	Riyad al-Malki	Ba'ath Party
Budget Committee	Vice-Chair	Muhammad Khayr al-Hariri	National Party
Budget Committee	Rapporteur	Rizqallah al-Antaki	People's Party
Constitution Committee	Chair	Suhail al-Khoury	National Party
Constitution Committee	Vice-Chair	Adil al-Ajlani	National Party
Constitution Committee	Rapporteur	Abd al-Halim Qaddur	
Education Committee	Chair	Muhammad al-Mubarak	Muslim Brotherhood
Education Committee	Vice-Chair	Ratib al-Husami	People's Party
Education Committee	Rapporteur	Abd al-Karim Zuhur Addi	Ba'ath Party
Endowments Committee	Chair	Raif al-Malqi	Independent
Endowments Committee	Vice-Chair	Abd al-Rauf Abu Tawq	Muslim Brotherhood
Endowments Committee	Rapporteur	Mazhar ash-Sharbaji	National Party
Financial Laws Committee	Chair	Raif al-Malqi	Independent
Financial Laws Committee	Vice-Chair	Hussein Maryud	Ba'ath Party
Financial Laws Committee	Rapporteur	Rizqallah Salim	
Foreign Affairs Committee	Chair	Ihsan al-Jabri	National Party
Foreign Affairs Committee	Vice-Chair	Abd al-Karim Zuhur Addi	Ba'ath Party
Foreign Affairs Committee	Rapporteur	Abdul-Wahab Hawmad	People's Party
Health and Ambulance Committee	Chair	George Shalhub	People's Party
Health and Ambulance Committee	Vice-Chair	Dikran Jerajian	People's Party
Health and Ambulance Committee	Rapporteur	Subhi Taha	
Interior Committee	Chair	Rashad Barmada	People's Party
Interior Committee	Vice-Chair	Muhammad Youssef Abu Rumiyya	
Interior Committee	Rapporteur	Abd al-Halim Qaddur	
Inspection and Accounts Committee	Chair	Qadri al-Mufti	
Inspection and Accounts Committee	Vice-Chair	Abd al-Hamid al-Dweidari	People's Party
Inspection and Accounts Committee	Rapporteur	Kamal Kalalib	Syrian Communist Party
Judicial Committee	Chair	Rafiq Bashur	People's Party
Judicial Committee	Vice-Chair	Adil al-Ajlani	National Party
Judicial Committee	Rapporteur	Mazhar ash-Sharbaji	National Party
National Defense Committee	Chair	Dikran Jerajian	People's Party
National Defense Committee	Vice-Chair	Sayyah Aamer	
National Defense Committee	Rapporteur	Ahmad al-Hajj Yunis	
National Economy Committee	Chair	Maarouf al-Dawalibi	People's Party
National Economy Committee	Vice-Chair	Sayyah Abu Asali	
National Economy Committee	Rapporteur	Ahmad al-Hajj Yunis	
Petitions Committee	Chair	Adil al-Kikhya	
Petitions Committee	Vice-Chair	Sayyah Aamer	
Petitions Committee	Rapporteur	Abd al-Latif al-Yunis	National Party
Petroleum Committee	Chair	Maarouf al-Dawalibi	People's Party
Petroleum Committee	Vice-Chair	Riyad al-Malki	Ba'ath Party
Petroleum Committee	Rapporteur	Ahmad Ismail	Arab Liberation Movement
Public Works and Transportation Committee	Chair	Ahmad Ismail	Arab Liberation Movement
Public Works and Transportation Committee	Vice-Chair	Hasan Munib al-Youssefi	
Public Works and Transportation Committee	Rapporteur	Shahin Mustafa Shahin	
Social Affairs and Labour Committee	Chair	Ali Bozo	People's Party
Social Affairs and Labour Committee	Vice-Chair	Mansur al-Atrash	Ba'ath Party
Social Affairs and Labour Committee	Rapporteur	Ratib al-Husami	People's Party
Tribes Committee	Chair	Tamer al-Mulhim	
Tribes Committee	Vice-Chair	Diab al-Mashi	People's Party
Tribes Committee	Rapporteur	Hasan Abd al-Karim	
