= Third Sabri al-Asali government =

1956 Syrian government

- 56th government of the Syrian Republic

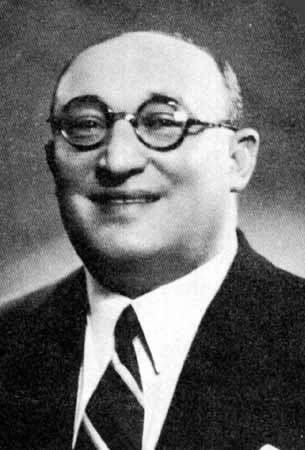
- Date formed: 14 June 1956
- Date dissolved: 31 December 1956

People and organisations
- President: Shukri al-Quwatli
- Prime Minister: Sabri al-Asali
- Prime Minister's history: al-Asali I al-Asali II
- No. of ministers: 11
- Member parties: ▌National Party; ▌People's Party; ▌Ba'ath Party; ▌Independent
- Opposition parties: ▌Socialist Cooperation; ▌SSNP; ▌Arab Liberation; ▌Communist

History
- Legislature term: 6th Chamber of Deputies
- Predecessor: al-Ghazzi II
- Successor: al-Asali IV

The Third Sabri al-Asali government was the fifty-sixth government in the history of modern Syria and the twelfth administration of the Second Syrian Republic. Formed on 14 June 1956, it was the second government to serve during the second presidency of Shukri al-Quwatli.

The government was widely regarded as a Ba'athist-influenced administration, reflecting an understanding between President Shukri al-Quwatli and the Arab Socialist Ba'ath Party regarding the choice of prime minister. The Ba'ath Party secured two of the government's most important portfolios, namely the ministries of Foreign Affairs and National Economy, thereby increasing its influence within the Syrian political system.

During its tenure, the government banned the Syrian Social Nationalist Party and claimed to have thwarted a military coup allegedly supported by the United States. Following the outbreak of the Suez Crisis in October 1956, the government declared a state of emergency and adopted measures intended to safeguard national security during the regional conflict.

The government resigned on 31 December 1956 as part of a political realignment designed to remove ministers associated with the People's Party and pave the way for a more openly partisan administration. Its resignation marked a further shift in Syrian politics towards stronger party influence and closer cooperation between the government and the Ba'ath movement.

== Composition ==
Portfolio	Minister	Took office	Left office	Party
Prime Minister	Sabri al-Asali	14 June 1956	31 December 1956	National Party
Minister of Finance	Sabri al-Asali	14 June 1956	31 December 1956	National Party
Minister of State	Muhammad al-Ayish	14 June 1956	31 December 1956	Independent
Minister of Public Works and Transport	Majd al-Din al-Jabri	14 June 1956	31 December 1956	National Party
Minister of Health and Ambulance	Abd al-Baqi Nizam ad-Din	14 June 1956	31 December 1956	Independent
Minister of Interior	Ahmad Qanbar	14 June 1956	31 December 1956	People's Party
Minister of Education	Abdul-Wahab Hawmad	14 June 1956	31 December 1956	People's Party
Minister of Agriculture	Rashad Jabri	14 June 1956	31 December 1956	People's Party
Minister of Justice	Mustafa al-Zarqa	14 June 1956	31 December 1956	Independent
Minister of Foreign Affairs	Salah al-Din al-Bitar	14 June 1956	31 December 1956	Ba'ath Party
Minister of National Economy	Khalil al-Kallas	14 June 1956	31 December 1956	Ba'ath Party
Minister of National Defense	Abdul-Hasib Raslan	14 June 1956	31 December 1956	Independent

== See also ==
- Council of Ministers (Syria)
- List of Syrian governments
- Government ministries of Syria
- List of prime ministers of Syria
