= Aleppo (Chamber of Deputies electoral district) =

Former electoral district of Syria's national legislature

- Former electoral district for the Chamber of Deputies

Former electoral district
- Created: 1928
- Abolished: 1963
- Seats: List: 16 (1943–1947; 1961–1963); 14 (1954–1958); 8 (1953–1954); 12 (1949–1953); 15 (1947–1949); 11 (1936–1943); 9 (1931–1936); 10 (1928–1931)
- Replaced by: Aleppo

Aleppo (Arabic: حلب) was an electoral district used to elect members of the Syrian Chamber of Deputies between 1928 and 1963.

== Electoral system ==
Under the 1928 electoral system, Syria adopted its first formal electoral law after the Ottoman period and under the French Mandate. Promulgated by arrêté No. 1889 of High Commissioner Ponsot, the system created a two-tier indirect electoral system. Male citizens over the age of 21 would elect secondary electors, at a ratio of one elector per hundred first-tier voters, who would then elect members of parliament. The number of seats was determined before every election based on the proportional population size of each electoral district, with seats allocated across religious communities according to their numerical share. The system was criticised for entrenching the influence of local notables, elites, and landowners, with limited direct popular participation.

In 1947, the government of Jamil Mardam Bey introduced a new direct electoral system. The system was applied for the first time in the 1947 elections and was amended twice, in 1954 and 1961. It remained in force through the 1961 elections and until the fall of the Second Republic in 1963.

Until 1949, the electorate consisted of Syrian men aged 20 and over. Following Husni al-Za'im's seizure of power, the voting age was lowered to 18 and women were granted the right to vote. The subsequent Hashim al-Atassi government retained the lower voting age but restricted women's suffrage to literate women only, without the right to stand for election. It was not until the 1954 elections, held under the 1950 constitution, that women of all educational backgrounds were granted equal rights to vote and stand for office.

== Deputies ==
Elections	Deputy (Party)	Deputy (Party)	Deputy (Party)	Deputy (Party)	Deputy (Party)	Deputy (Party)	Deputy (Party)	Deputy (Party)	Deputy (Party)	Deputy (Party)	Deputy (Party)	Deputy (Party)	Deputy (Party)	Deputy (Party)	Deputy (Party)	Deputy (Party)
1928	Ibrahim Hananu (NB)	Saadallah al-Jabiri (NB)	Abd al-Rahman al-Kayyali (NB)	Ahmad al-Rifai (NB)	Abd al-Qadir al-Sarmini (N/A)	Fathallah Asyun (NB)	Niqula Khanji (NB)	Latif Ghanima (NB)	George Azar (N/A)	Mehran Yuzantian (N/A)	10 seats					
1931–32	Subhi Barakat (Ind.)	Ghalib Ibrahim Pasha (N/A)	Shaki al-Shabani (N/A)	Basim Qudsi (N/A)	Hrag Papazian (N/A)	Henry Handiyeh (N/A)	Niqula Khanji (NB)	Latif Ghanima (NB)	Selim Janbart (Ind.)	9 seats						
1936	Hassan Fouad Ibrahim (N/A)	Saadallah al-Jabiri (NB)	Abd al-Rahman al-Kayyali (NB)	Nazim al-Qudsi (Until 1947: NB; From 1948: PP)	Abd al-Qadir al-Sarmini (N/A)	Fathallah Asyun (NB)	Rushdi al-Kikhya (Until 1947: NB; From 1948: PP)	Hrant Salahyat (N/A)	Radrus Meltabashian (N/A)	Edmond Al-Homsi (NB)	Edmond Rabat (N/A)	11 seats				
1943	Wahbi al-Hariri (Ind.)	Saadallah al-Jabiri (NB)	Abd al-Rahman al-Kayyali (NB)	Nazim al-Qudsi (Until 1947: NB; From 1948: PP)	Hrag Papazian (N/A)	Fathallah Asyun (NB)	Rushdi al-Kikhya (Until 1947: NB; From 1948: PP)	Ahmad Khalil al-Mudarris (N/A)	Latif Ghanima (Until 1947: NB; From 1948: PP)	Sami Saaim al-Dahr (N/A)	Ali al-Hayyani (N/A)	Michel Rafi (N/A)	Joseph Ilyan (Until 1947: NB; From 1948: PP)	Mikhail Ilyan (NB)	Azra Azraq (N/A)	Moses Slatian (N/A)
1946 by-election	Wahbi al-Hariri (Ind.)	Saadallah al-Jabiri (NB)	Abd al-Rahman al-Kayyali (NB)	Nazim al-Qudsi (Until 1947: NB; From 1948: PP)	Hrag Papazian (N/A)	Fathallah Asyun (NB)	Rushdi al-Kikhya (Until 1947: NB; From 1948: PP)	Ahmad Khalil al-Mudarris (N/A)	Latif Ghanima (Until 1947: NB; From 1948: PP)	Sami Saaim al-Dahr (N/A)	Ali al-Hayyani (N/A)	Dikran Jerejian (Until 1947: NB; From 1948: PP)	Joseph Ilyan (Until 1947: NB; From 1948: PP)	Mikhail Ilyan (NB)	Azra Azraq (N/A)	Moses Slatian (N/A)
1947	Wahbi al-Hariri (Ind.)	Maarouf al-Dawalibi (PP)	Abdul-Wahab Hawmad (PP)	Nazim al-Qudsi (Until 1947: NB; From 1948: PP)	Mustafa Barmada (PP)	Abdullah Fattal (PP)	Rushdi al-Kikhya (Until 1947: NB; From 1948: PP)	Ahmad al-Rifai (Ind.)	Latif Ghanima (Until 1947: NB; From 1948: PP)	Ahmad Qanbar (PP)	Rizqallah al-Antaki (PP)	Dikran Jerejian (Until 1947: NB; From 1948: PP)	Joseph Ilyan (Until 1947: NB; From 1948: PP)	Jibrayil Ghazal (PP)	Louis Handiyeh (N/A)	15 seats
1949	Abd al-Latif Siba'i (PP)	Maarouf al-Dawalibi (PP)	Abdul-Wahab Hawmad (PP)	Nazim al-Qudsi (Until 1947: NB; From 1948: PP)	Anwar Ibrahim Pasha (N/A)	Fathallah Asyun (PP)	Rushdi al-Kikhya (Until 1947: NB; From 1948: PP)	Rizqallah Salem (N/A)	Latif Ghanima (Until 1947: NB; From 1948: PP)	Ahmad Qanbar (PP)	Rizqallah al-Antaki (PP)	Dikran Jerejian (Until 1947: NB; From 1948: PP)	12 seats			
1953	Hani al-Rayis (N/A)	Hikmat Maslati (N/A)	Nafi Saaim al-Dahr (N/A)	Wajih al-Jabri (N/A)	Nafi Mujib al-Qudsi (N/A)	Grigor Ablighatian (N/A)	Philip Husni (N/A)	Victor Korneli (N/A)	8 seats							
1954 (Mar) (Note: The parliament elected in 1949 was restored in March 1954 after the regime of Adib Shishakli was overthrown. Deputies resumed their seats until the end of the term in July.)	Abd al-Latif Siba'i (PP)	Maarouf al-Dawalibi (PP)	Abdul-Wahab Hawmad (PP)	Nazim al-Qudsi (PP)	Anwar Ibrahim Pasha (N/A)	Fathallah Asyun (PP)	Rushdi al-Kikhya (PP)	Rizqallah Salem (N/A)	Latif Ghanima (PP)	Ahmad Qanbar (PP	Rizqallah al-Antaki (PP)	Dikran Jerajian (PP)	12 seats			
1954 (Oct)	Rashad Barmada (PP)	Maarouf al-Dawalibi (PP)	Abdul-Wahab Hawmad (PP)	Nazim al-Qudsi (PP)	Majd al-Din al-Jabri (NP)	Mikhail Ilyan (NP)	Rushdi al-Kikhya (PP)	Rizqallah Salim (N/A)	Mustafa al-Zarqa (Ind.)	Ahmad Qanbar (PP	Rizqallah al-Antaki (PP)	Dikran Jerajian (PP)	Ihsan al-Jabri (NP)	Leon Zamarya (NP)	14 seats	
1955 by-election	Rashad Barmada (PP)	Maarouf al-Dawalibi (PP)	Abdul-Wahab Hawmad (PP)	Nazim al-Qudsi (PP)	Majd al-Din al-Jabri (NP)	Antoine Hamed (N/A)	Rushdi al-Kikhya (PP)	Rizqallah Salim (N/A)	Mustafa al-Zarqa (Ind.)	Ahmad Qanbar (PP	Rizqallah al-Antaki (PP)	Dikran Jerajian (PP)	Ihsan al-Jabri (NP)	Leon Zamarya (NP)	14 seats	
1961	Rashad Barmada (PP)	Maarouf al-Dawalibi (PP)	Alaa al-Din al-Jabiri (PP)	Asaad al-Kurani (NP)	Abd al-Salam Kanaan (NP)	Abd al-Fattah Abu Ghudda (MB)	Bakri al-Qabbani (PP)	Abd al-Khaliq Ibrahim (PP)	Mustafa al-Zarqa (Ind.)	Ahmad Qanbar (PP	Muhammad Talas (NP)	Aram Karamanoukian (Ind.)	Naum al-Suyufi (NP)	Leon Zamarya (NP)	Grigor Ablighatian (Ind.)	Joseph Jarmaq (Ind.)
