= Second Said al-Ghazzi government =

1955–1956 Syrian government

- 55th government of the Syrian Republic

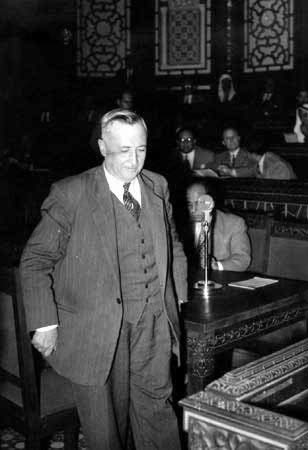
- Date formed: 13 September 1955
- Date dissolved: 14 June 1956

People and organisations
- President: Shukri al-Quwatli
- Prime Minister: Said al-Ghazzi
- Prime Minister's history: al-Ghazzi I
- No. of ministers: 13
- Member parties: ▌People's Party; ▌National Party; ▌Independent
- Opposition parties: ▌Ba'ath Party; ▌Socialist Cooperation; ▌SSNP; ▌Arab Liberation; ▌Communist

History
- Election: –
- Legislature term: 6th Chamber of Deputies
- Predecessor: al-Asali II
- Successor: al-Asali III

The Second Sa'id al-Ghazzi government was the fifty-fifth government in the history of modern Syria and the fortieth administration of the Second Syrian Republic. Formed on 13 September 1955, it was the first government to serve during the second presidency of Shukri al-Quwatli and the second cabinet headed by Said al-Ghazzi.

The government received the confidence of the Chamber of Deputies with 88 votes in favour, 31 against, 3 abstentions, and 20 absences. During its tenure, it oversaw the trials related to the assassination of Adnan al-Malki and concluded a military agreement with Egypt to supply the Syrian Army with arms. It also signed a broader military and economic agreement with Czechoslovakia and began negotiations with Romania and China, all countries associated with the Eastern Bloc and communist states.

The government strengthened Syria's relations with the Egyptian–Saudi–Syrian alliance in opposition to the Turkish–Iraqi–Jordanian alignment during the Cold War. Domestically, the government faced growing political tensions, including armed clashes in Hama between supporters of the Arab Socialist Ba'ath Party and landowners and traditional elites, which resulted in one death and twenty-four injuries. The unrest contributed to the government's resignation and the convening of an extraordinary parliamentary session.

== Composition ==
Portfolio	Minister	Took office	Left office	Party
Prime Minister	Said al-Ghazzi	13 September 1955	14 June 1956	Independent
Minister of Foreign Affairs	Said al-Ghazzi	13 September 1955	14 June 1956	Independent
Minister of Justice	Munir al-Ajlani	13 September 1955	14 June 1956	Independent
Minister of State	Hasan al-Atrash	13 September 1955	14 June 1956	Independent
Minister of Public Works and Transport	Abd al-Baqi Nizam ad-Din	13 February 1955	14 June 1956	People's Party
Minister of National Defense	Rashad Barmada	13 September 1955	14 June 1956	People's Party
Minister of National Economy	Ali Bozo	13 September 1955	14 September 1955	People's Party
Minister of National Economy	Rizqallah al-Antaki	14 September 1955	14 September 1955	People's Party
Minister of Agriculture	Abdul-Wahab Hawmad	13 September 1955	14 June 1956	People's Party
Minister of Agriculture	Mustafa Mirza	13 September 1955	14 June 1956	Independent
Minister of State	Muhammad Sulayman al-Ahmad	13 September 1955	14 June 1956	National Party
Minister of Finance	Rizqallah al-Antaki	13 September 1955	14 September 1955	People's Party
Minister of Finance	Abdul-Wahab Hawmad	14 September 1955	14 June 1956	People's Party
Minister of Education	Maamun al-Kuzbari	13 September 1955	14 June 1956	Independent
Minister of State	Asaad Harun	13 September 1955	14 June 1956	National Party
Minister of Interior	Abdul-Hasib Raslan	13 September 1955	14 September 1955	Independent
Minister of Interior	Ali Bozo	14 September 1955	14 June 1956	People's Party
Minister of Health and Ambulance	Badri al-Abboud	13 September 1955	14 June 1956	Independent

== See also ==
- Council of Ministers (Syria)
- List of Syrian governments
- Government ministries of Syria
- List of prime ministers of Syria
