= Fourth Sabri al-Asali government =

1956–1958 Syrian government

- 57th government of the Syrian Republic

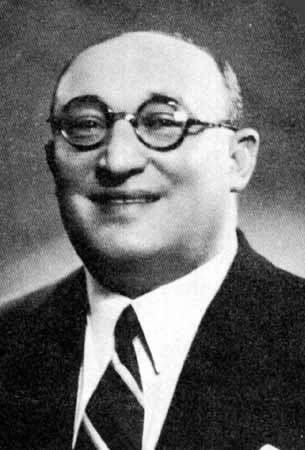
- Date formed: 31 December 1956
- Date dissolved: 6 March 1958

People and organisations
- President: Shukri al-Quwatli
- Prime Minister: Sabri al-Asali
- Prime Minister's history: al-Asali I al-Asali II al-Asali III
- No. of ministers: 11
- Member parties: ▌National Party; ▌Ba'ath Party; ▌Independent
- Opposition parties: ▌People's Party; ▌Socialist Cooperation; ▌SSNP; ▌Arab Liberation; ▌Communist

History
- Outgoing formation: Union with Egypt
- Legislature term: 6th Chamber of Deputies
- Predecessor: al-Asali III
- Successor: Abdel Nasser IV

The Fourth Sabri al-Asali government was the fifty-seventh government in the history of modern Syria and the thirteenth administration of the Second Syrian Republic. Formed on 31 December 1956, it was the third and final government to serve during the second presidency of Shukri al-Quwatli.

The government remained in office for fourteen months and secured parliamentary confidence by a vote of 69 in favour and 4 against, while 69 deputies were absent. Its coalition included representatives of the National Party, the Arab Socialist Ba'ath Party, and prominent independent politicians such as Khalid al-Azm, reflecting a broad political consensus in support of Arab unity and closer relations with the Eastern Bloc.

During its tenure, the government concluded the largest agreement in Syrian history up to that time with the Soviet Union, significantly expanding economic and strategic cooperation between the two countries. Its ministerial programme also called for the establishment of a federal union with Egypt. Negotiations with the Egyptian government progressed rapidly, and within a year the two states agreed to full political union rather than a federal arrangement.

The government played a central role in the negotiations that led to the creation of the United Arab Republic. The union was approved by referendum and formally proclaimed on 22 February 1958, bringing an end to an independent Syrian state and concluding the tenure of the Fourth Sabri al-Asali government.

== Composition ==
Portfolio	Minister	Took office	Left office	Party
Prime Minister	Sabri al-Asali	14 June 1956	6 March 1958	National Party
Minister of Interior	Sabri al-Asali	31 December 1956	6 March 1958	National Party
Minister of State	Khalid al-Azm	31 December 1956	6 March 1958	Independent
Minister of National Defense	Khalid al-Azm	31 December 1956	6 March 1958	Independent
Minister of Education	Hani al-Sibai	31 December 1956	6 March 1958	People's Party
Minister of Agriculture	Hamid al-Khoja	31 December 1956	6 March 1958	Independent
Minister of Public Works and Transport	Fakhir al-Kayyali	31 December 1956	6 March 1958	National Party
Minister of Justice	Maamun al-Kuzbari	31 December 1956	6 March 1958	Independent
Minister of Social Affairs	Maamun al-Kuzbari (acting)	31 December 1956	6 March 1958	Independent
Minister of Health and Ambulance	Asaad Harun	31 December 1956	6 March 1958	National Party
Minister of Foreign Affairs	Salah al-Din al-Bitar	14 June 1956	6 March 1958	Ba'ath Party
Minister of National Economy	Khalil al-Kallas	14 June 1956	6 March 1958	Ba'ath Party
Minister of Finance	Asaad Mahasen	31 December 1956	6 March 1958	Independent
Minister of State	Salih Uqayl	31 December 1956	6 March 1958	Independent

== See also ==
- Council of Ministers (Syria)
- List of Syrian governments
- Government ministries of Syria
- List of prime ministers of Syria
