= Fourth Fares al-Khoury government =

1954–1955 Syrian government

- 53rd government of the Syrian Republic

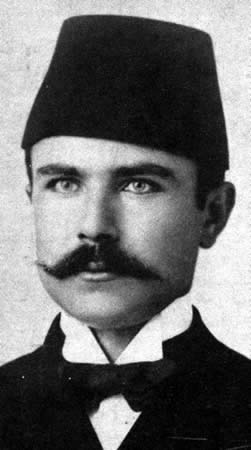
- Date formed: 29 October 1954
- Date dissolved: 13 February 1955

People and organisations
- President: Hashim al-Atassi
- Prime Minister: Fares al-Khoury
- Prime Minister's history: al-Khoury I al-Khoury II al-Khoury III
- No. of ministers: 11
- Member parties: ▌People's Party; ▌National Party; ▌Independent
- Opposition parties: ▌Ba'ath Party; ▌Socialist Cooperation; ▌SSNP; ▌Arab Liberation; ▌Communist

History
- Incoming formation: 1954 parliamentary election
- Legislature term: 6th Chamber of Deputies
- Predecessor: al-Ghazzi I
- Successor: al-Asali II

The Fourth Fares al-Khoury government was the fifty-third government in the history of modern Syria and the ninth administration of the Second Syrian Republic. Formed on 3 November 1954 following the 1954 Syrian parliamentary election, it was the tenth government to serve during the second presidency of Hashim al-Atassi and the fourth and final cabinet headed by Fares al-Khoury.

The government took office during a period of renewed parliamentary politics following the restoration of constitutional rule after the fall of the Adib Shishakli regime. Its tenure was marked by growing political competition and the increasing influence of the Arab Socialist Ba'ath Party, which, together with allied political forces, emerged as a prominent opposition bloc.

Remaining in office for approximately six months, the government faced sustained criticism and parliamentary opposition from Ba'athist and pro-Ba'ath factions. Unable to maintain sufficient political support in the face of these challenges, the cabinet ultimately resigned, bringing an end to the final premiership of Fares al-Khoury.

== Composition ==
Portfolio	Minister	Took office	Left office	Party
Prime Minister	Fares al-Khoury	29 October 1954	13 February 1955	People's Party
Minister of Foreign Affairs	Faydi al-Atassi	29 October 1954	13 February 1955	People's Party
Minister of Education	Munir al-Ajlani	29 October 1954	13 February 1955	Independent
Minister of Public Works and Transport	Majd al-Din al-Jabri	29 October 1954	13 February 1955	National Party
Minister of Interior	Ahmad Qanbar	29 October 1954	13 February 1955	People's Party
Minister of National Defense	Rashad Barmada	29 October 1954	13 February 1955	People's Party
Minister of Justice	Ali Bozo	29 October 1954	13 February 1955	People's Party
Minister of Health and Ambulance	Muhammad Sulayman al-Ahmad	29 October 1954	13 February 1955	National Party
Minister of National Economy	Fakhir al-Kayyali	29 October 1954	13 February 1955	National Party
Minister of Finance	Rizqallah al-Antaki	29 October 1954	13 February 1955	People's Party
Minister of Agriculture	Abd al-Samad al-Futayh	29 October 1954	13 February 1955	Independent

== See also ==
- Council of Ministers (Syria)
- List of Syrian governments
- Government ministries of Syria
- List of prime ministers of Syria
