= Second Sabri al-Asali government =

1955 Syrian government

- 54th government of the Syrian Republic

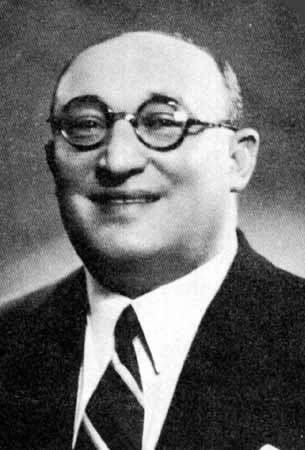
- Date formed: 13 February 1955
- Date dissolved: 13 September 1955

People and organisations
- President: Hashim al-Atassi
- Prime Minister: Fares al-Khoury
- Prime Minister's history: al-Asali I
- No. of ministers: 9
- Member parties: ▌National Party; ▌People's Party; ▌Ba'ath Party; ▌Independent
- Opposition parties: ▌Socialist Cooperation; ▌SSNP; ▌Arab Liberation; ▌Communist

History
- Election: –
- Legislature term: 6th Chamber of Deputies
- Predecessor: al-Khoury IV
- Successor: al-Ghazzi II

The Second Sabri al-Asali government was the fifty-fourth government in the history of modern Syria and the tenth administration of the Second Syrian Republic. Formed on 13 February 1955, it was the eleventh and final government to serve during the second presidency of Hashim al-Atassi and the second government headed by Sabri al-Asali.

The government was established during a period of political transition and was principally tasked with overseeing the presidential election that followed the conclusion of al-Atassi's constitutional term. During its tenure, it supervised the electoral process that resulted in the election of Shukri al-Quwatli to a second term as President of the Republic.

Following the inauguration of President al-Quwatli, the government resigned in accordance with the provisions of the constitution. Its brief administration marked the end of Hashim al-Atassi's second presidency and facilitated the peaceful transfer of power to a new presidential term.

== Composition ==
Portfolio	Minister	Took office	Left office	Party
Prime Minister	Sabri al-Asali	13 February 1955	13 September 1955	National Party
Minister of Interior	Sabri al-Asali	13 February 1955	13 September 1955	National Party
Minister of Foreign Affairs	Khalid al-Azm	13 February 1955	13 September 1955	Independent
Minister of National Defense	Khalid al-Azm (acting)	13 February 1955	13 September 1955	Independent
Minister of Public Works and Transport	Abd al-Baqi Nizam ad-Din	13 February 1955	13 September 1955	People's Party
Minister of Education	Raif al-Malqi	13 February 1955	13 September 1955	Independent
Minister of Agriculture	Hamid al-Khoja	13 February 1955	13 September 1955	Independent
Minister of National Economy	Fakhir al-Kayyali	13 February 1955	13 September 1955	National Party
Minister of Finance	Leon Zamarya	13 February 1955	13 September 1955	National Party
Minister of Justice	Maamun al-Kuzbari	13 February 1955	13 September 1955	Independent
Minister of State	Wahib al-Ghanim	13 February 1955	13 September 1955	Ba'ath Party
Minister of Health and Ambulance	Wahib al-Ghanim (acting)	13 February 1955	13 September 1955	Ba'ath Party

== See also ==
- Council of Ministers (Syria)
- List of Syrian governments
- Government ministries of Syria
- List of prime ministers of Syria
