= List of prime ministers of Syria =

This is a list of prime ministers of Syria from 1920 to 2025.

== List of officeholders ==
=== Syria (1920–1958) ===
No.	Portrait	Name (Birth–Death)	Term of office			Political party	Government	Notes	Ref.
No.	Portrait	Name (Birth–Death)	Took office	Left office	Time in office	Political party	Government	Notes	Ref.
Arab Kingdom of Syria (1920)
1		Rida Pasha al-Rikabi رضا باشا الركابي (1864–1943)	8 March 1920	3 May 1920	56 days	Independent	al-Rikabi II	Previously Military Governor in the Occupied Enemy Territory Administration (1 October 1918 – 14 December 1919)	
—		Hashim al-Atassi هاشم الأتاسي (1875–1960) acting	3 May 1920	26 July 1920	84 days	Independent	al-Atassi I al-Droubi (From 25 July 1920)		
French mandate (1920–1930)
State of Damascus (1920–1922), Syrian Federation (1922–1925) and State of Syria (1925–1930)
2		Aladdin al-Droubi علاء الدين الدروبي (1870–1920)	26 July 1920	21 August 1920	26 days	Independent	al-Droubi		
Vacant (21 August 1920 – 6 September 1920)
3		Jamil al-Ulshi جميل الألشي (1883–1951)	6 September 1920	30 November 1920	85 days	Independent	al-Ulshi I		
—		Haqqi al-Azm حقي العظم (1864–1955) acting	1 December 1920	28 June 1922	1 year, 209 days	Independent	H. al-Azm I		
4		Subhi Bey Barakat صبحي بك بركات الخالدي (1889–1939)	28 June 1922	21 December 1925	3 years, 176 days	Independent	Barakat I–II		
Vacant (21 December 1925 – 29 December 1925)
—		Taj al-Din al-Hasani تاج الدين الحسني (1885–1943) acting	29 December 1925	6 January 1926	8 days	Independent	No cabinet		
Vacant (6 January 1926 – 28 April 1926)
5		Ahmad Nami أحمد نامي (1873–1962)	28 April 1926	9 February 1928	1 year, 287 days	Independent	(No cabinet until 4 May 1926); Nami I–II–III (No cabinet on 9 February 1928)		
Vacant (9 February 1928 – 15 April 1928)
6		Taj al-Din al-Hasani تاج الدين الحسني (1885–1943)	15 April 1928	14 May 1930	2 years, 29 days	Independent	al-Hasani I		
First Syrian Republic (1930–1950)
Mandatory Syrian Republic (1930–1946)
(6)		Taj al-Din al-Hasani تاج الدين الحسني (1885–1943)	14 May 1930	19 November 1931	1 year, 189 days	Independent	al-Hasani I		
—		Léon Solomiac (1873–1960) acting	19 November 1931	11 June 1932	205 days	Independent	Solomiac		
7		Haqqi al-Azm حقي العظم (1864–1955)	7 June 1932	16 March 1934	1 year, 282 days	Independent	H. al-Azm II		
(6)		Taj al-Din al-Hasani تاج الدين الحسني (1885–1943)	16 March 1934	22 February 1936	1 year, 343 days	Independent	al-Hasani II	Al-Hasani resigned following the 1936 general strike.	
8		Ata Bey al-Ayyubi عطا الأيوبي (1877–1951)	22 February 1936	21 December 1936	303 days	Independent	A. al-Ayyubi I	Al-Ayyubi's premiership was provisional, and his government resigned after parliamentary elections were held in November 1936.	
9		Jamil Mardam Bey جميل مردم بك (1894–1960)	21 December 1936	23 February 1939	2 years, 64 days	National Bloc	Mardam Bey I	Mardam Bey resigned following protests over the separation of the Sanjak of Alexandretta from Syria with the creation of the Hatay State, which would later be annexed by Turkey on 29 June 1939.	
10		Lutfi al-Haffar لطفي الحفار (1885–1968)	23 February 1939	5 April 1939	41 days	National Bloc	al-Haffar	Al-Haffar resigned following the spread of protests in the wake of the separation of Alexandretta from Syria.	
11		Nasuhi al-Bukhari نصوحي البخاري (1881–1961)	5 April 1939	4 July 1939	90 days	Independent	al-Bukhari (No cabinet from 15 May 1939)	Al-Bukhari failed to defuse the demonstrations over the Alexandretta issue. The resignation of his cabinet was shortly followed by that of President Hashim al-Atassi on 7 July 1939. Following the crisis, the Syrian constitution was suspended by the French authorities.	
—		Bahij al-Khatib بهيج الخطيب (1895–1981) acting	4 July 1939	4 April 1941	1 year, 274 days	Independent	al-Khatib (No cabinet between 2 April and 4 April 1941)	Al-Khatib was appointed by the French authorities, with the merged functions of Prime Minister and President, at the head of a provisional government of independents known as the "Board of Commissioners" (French: "Conseil des Commissaires"). He was eventually asked to resign after a surge in protests.	
12		Khalid al-Azm خالد العظم (1903–1965)	4 April 1941	21 September 1941	170 days	Independent	(No cabinet on 4 April 1941); K. al-Azm I	Al-Azm's tenure was marked by the Allied invasion of Syria.	
13		Hassan al-Hakim حسن الحكيم (1886–1982)	21 September 1941	19 April 1942	210 days	Independent	al-Hakim I		
14		Husni al-Barazi حسني البرازي (1895–1975)	19 April 1942	10 January 1943	266 days	Independent	H. al-Barazi		
(3)		Jamil al-Ulshi جميل الألشي (1883–1951)	10 January 1943	25 March 1943	74 days	Independent	al-Ulshi II		
(8)		Ata Bey al-Ayyubi عطا الأيوبي (1877–1951)	25 March 1943	19 August 1943	147 days	Independent	A. al-Ayyubi II		
15		Saadallah al-Jabiri سعد الله الجابري (1891–1948)	19 August 1943	14 October 1944	56 days	National Bloc	al-Jabiri I		
16		Fares al-Khoury فارس الخوري (1877–1962)	14 October 1944	1 October 1945	352 days	National Bloc	al-Khoury I–II–III		
(15)		Saadallah al-Jabiri سعد الله الجابري (1891–1948)	1 October 1945	17 April 1946	198 days	National Bloc	al-Jabiri II		
Independent First Syrian Republic (1946–1950)
(15)		Saadallah al-Jabiri سعد الله الجابري (1891–1948)	17 April 1946	16 December 1946	243 days	National Bloc	al-Jabiri II (Until 25 April 1946) al-Jabiri III		
—		Khalid al-Azm خالد العظم (1903–1965) acting	16 December 1946	29 December 1946	13 days	Independent	al-Jabiri III; Mardam Bey II		
(9)		Jamil Mardam Bey جميل مردم بك (1894–1960)	29 December 1946	17 December 1948	1 year, 354 days	National Bloc	Mardam Bey II–III–IV (No cabinet from 3 December to 15 December 1948); K. al-Azm II		
(12)		Khalid al-Azm خالد العظم (1903–1965)	17 December 1948	30 March 1949	103 days	Independent	K. al-Azm II (No cabinet on 30 March 1949)	Azm was overthrown in the March 1949 coup d'état.	
17		Husni al-Za'im حسني الزعيم (1897–1949)	30 March 1949	26 June 1949	88 days	Independent (SSNP–affiliated)	(No cabinet until 16 April 1949) al-Za'im		
18		Muhsin al-Barazi محسن البرازي (1904–1949)	26 June 1949	14 August 1949	49 days	Independent	M. al-Barazi	Barazi was executed following the August 1949 coup d'état.	
19		Hashim al-Atassi هاشم الأتاسي (1875–1960)	14 August 1949	24 December 1949	132 days	People's Party	al-Atassi II (No cabinet from 15 December to 24 December 1949)		
20		Nazim al-Qudsi ناظم القدسي (1906–1998)	24 December 1949	27 December 1949	3 days	People's Party	al-Qudsi I		
(12)		Khalid al-Azm خالد العظم (1903–1965)	27 December 1949	4 June 1950	159 days	Independent	K. al-Azm III		
(20)		Nazim al-Qudsi ناظم القدسي (1906–1998)	4 June 1950	5 September 1950	93 days	People's Party	al-Qudsi II		
Second Syrian Republic (1950–1958)
(20)		Nazim al-Qudsi ناظم القدسي (1906–1998)	5 September 1950	27 March 1951	203 days	People's Party	al-Qudsi II (Until 8 September 1950) al-Qudsi III		
(12)		Khalid al-Azm خالد العظم (1903–1965)	27 March 1951	9 August 1951	135 days	Independent	K. al-Azm IV		
(13)		Hassan al-Hakim حسن الحكيم (1886–1982)	9 August 1951	13 November 1951	96 days	Independent	al-Hakim II		
—		Zaki al-Khatib زكي الخطيب (1887–1961) acting	13 November 1951	28 November 1951	15 days	People's Party	al-Hakim II		
21		Maarouf al-Dawalibi معروف الدواليبي (1909–2004)	28 November 1951	29 November 1951	1 day	People's Party	al-Dawalibi I (Cabinet existed until 1 December 1951)	Dawalibi was overthrown in the 1951 coup d'état.	
Vacant (29 November 1951 – 3 December 1951)
22		Fawzi Selu فوزي سلو (1905–1972)	3 December 1951	19 July 1953	1 year, 228 days	Military (ALM–affiliated)	(No cabinet until 9 June 1952); Selu (No cabinet from 12 July to 19 July 1953)	Selu had no power, real power was with Adib Shishakli.	
Position abolished (19 July 1953 – 1 March 1954)
23		Sabri al-Asali صبري العسلي (1903–1976)	1 March 1954	19 June 1954	110 days	National Party	al-Asali I		
24		Said al-Ghazzi سعيد الغزي (1893–1967)	19 June 1954	3 November 1954	137 days	Independent	al-Ghazzi I al-Khoury IV (From 29 October to 3 November 1954)		
(16)		Fares al-Khoury فارس الخوري (1877–1962)	3 November 1954	13 February 1955	102 days	People's Party	al-Khoury IV		
(23)		Sabri al-Asali صبري العسلي (1903–1976)	13 February 1955	13 September 1955	212 days	National Party	al-Asali II		
(24)		Said al-Ghazzi سعيد الغزي (1893–1967)	13 September 1955	14 June 1956	275 days	Independent	al-Ghazzi II		
(23)		Sabri al-Asali صبري العسلي (1903–1976)	14 June 1956	1 February 1958	1 year, 232 days	National Party	al-Asali III–IV (Cabinet existed until 6 March 1958)		
Vacant (1 February 1958 – 22 February 1958)

=== United Arab Republic (1958–1961) ===
No.	Portrait	Name (Birth–Death)	Term of office			Political party	Government	Ref.
No.	Portrait	Name (Birth–Death)	Took office	Left office	Time in office	Political party	Government	Ref.
United Arab Republic (1958–1961)
Position not established (22 February 1958 – 7 October 1958)
25		Nur al-Din Kahala نور الدين كحالة (1908–1965)	7 October 1958	20 September 1960	1 year, 349 days	National Union	Abdel Nasser IV–V	
26		Abdel Hamid al-Sarraj عبد الحميد السراج (1925–2013)	20 September 1960	16 August 1961	330 days	National Union	Abdel Nasser V–VI	
Vacant (16 August 1961 – 28 September 1961)

=== Syria (1961–1963) ===
No.	Portrait	Name (Birth–Death)	Term of office			Political party	Government	Notes	Ref.
No.	Portrait	Name (Birth–Death)	Took office	Left office	Time in office	Political party	Government	Notes	Ref.
Syrian Arab Republic (1961–1963)
Vacant (28 September 1961 – 29 September 1961)
27		Maamun al-Kuzbari مأمون الكزبري (1914–1998)	29 September 1961	20 November 1961	52 days	Independent	al-Kuzbari	Kuzbari took office following the 1961 coup d'état, which dissolved the United Arab Republic and restored the Second Syrian Republic on 29 September 1961.	
28		Izzat al-Nuss عزت النص (1912–1976)	20 November 1961	14 December 1961	24 days	Independent	al-Nuss (Cabinet existed until 22 December 1961)		
Vacant (14 December 1961 – 22 December 1961)
(21)		Maarouf al-Dawalibi معروف الدواليبي (1909–2004)	22 December 1961	27 March 1962	95 days	People's Party	al-Dawalibi II		
Vacant (27 March 1962 – 16 April 1962)
29		Bashir al-Azma بشير العظَمة (1910–1992)	16 April 1962	17 September 1962	154 days	Independent	al-Azma		
(12)		Khalid al-Azm خالد العظم (1903–1965)	17 September 1962	8 March 1963	172 days	Independent	K. al-Azm V	The 1963 coup d'état, an event known as the March 8 Revolution, toppled President Nazim al-Qudsi and brought the National Council for the Revolutionary Command (NCRC) to government, although real power lay with the Ba'athist Military Committee, which organized the coup.	

=== Ba'athist Syria (1963–2024) ===
No.	Portrait	Name (Birth–Death)	Term of office			Political party	Government	Notes	Ref.
No.	Portrait	Name (Birth–Death)	Took office	Left office	Time in office	Political party	Government	Notes	Ref.
Syrian Arab Republic (1963–2024)
(12)		Khalid al-Azm خالد العظم (1903–1965)	8 March 1963	9 March 1963	1 day	Independent	No cabinet	Azm was the first Prime Minister of the Ba'athist regime for some hours after the fall of the Second Syrian Republic in the March 8 Revolution.	
30		Salah al-Din al-Bitar صلاح الدين البيطار (1912–1980)	9 March 1963	11 May 1963	63 days	Ba'ath Party (Syria Region)	al-Bitar I		
—		Sami al-Jundi سامي الجندي (1921–1996) acting	11 May 1963	13 May 1963	2 days	Ba'ath Party (Syria Region)	No cabinet		
(30)		Salah al-Din al-Bitar صلاح الدين البيطار (1912–1980)	13 May 1963	11 November 1963	182 days	Ba'ath Party (Syria Region)	al-Bitar II–III		
31		Amin al-Hafiz أمين الحافظ (1921–2009)	12 November 1963	13 May 1964	183 days	Ba'ath Party (Syria Region)	al-Hafiz I		
(30)		Salah al-Din al-Bitar صلاح الدين البيطار (1912–1980)	14 May 1964	3 October 1964	142 days	Ba'ath Party (Syria Region)	al-Bitar IV		
(31)		Amin al-Hafiz أمين الحافظ (1921–2009)	4 October 1964	22 September 1965	353 days	Ba'ath Party (Syria Region)	al-Hafiz II		
32		Yusuf Zuayyin يوسف زعيّـن (1931–2016)	22 September 1965	21 December 1965	90 days	Ba'ath Party (Syria Region)	Zuayyin I (Cabinet existed until 27 December 1965)		
Vacant (21 December 1965 – 1 January 1966)
(30)		Salah al-Din al-Bitar صلاح الدين البيطار (1912–1980)	1 January 1966	23 February 1966	53 days	Ba'ath Party (Syria Region)	al-Bitar V	Bitar was overthrown by the Military Committee because of his support for Michel Aflaq and the National Command of the Arab Socialist Ba'ath Party.	
Vacant (23 February 1966 – 1 March 1966)
(32)		Yusuf Zuayyin يوسف زعيّـن (1931–2016)	1 March 1966	29 October 1968	2 years, 242 days	Syrian Ba'ath Party (Syria Region)	Zuayyin II (No cabinet from 28 October 1968)		
33		Nureddin al-Atassi نور الدين الأتاسي (1929–1992)	29 October 1968	18 November 1970	2 years, 20 days	Syrian Ba'ath Party (Syria Region)	N. al-Atassi (No cabinet from 15 November 1970)	Atassi was overthrown when a falling-out occurred between Salah Jadid, the real ruler of Syria from 1966 to 1970, and Hafez al-Assad, the Minister of Defense. Assad initiated the Corrective Movement in 1970.	
Vacant (18 November 1970 – 21 November 1970)
34		Hafez al-Assad حافظ الأسد (1930–2000)	21 November 1970	3 April 1971	133 days	Syrian Ba'ath Party (Syria Region)	al-Assad		
35		Abdul Rahman Khleifawi عبد الرحمن خليفاوي (1930–2009)	3 April 1971	21 December 1972	1 year, 262 days	Syrian Ba'ath Party (Syria Region)	Khleifawi I		
36		Mahmoud al-Ayyubi محمود الأيوبي (1932–2013)	21 December 1972	7 August 1976	3 years, 230 days	Syrian Ba'ath Party (Syria Region)	Khleifawi I (Until 23 December 1972); M. al-Ayyubi		
(35)		Abdul Rahman Khleifawi عبد الرحمن خليفاوي (1930–2009)	7 August 1976	27 March 1978	1 year, 232 days	Syrian Ba'ath Party (Syria Region)	Khleifawi II		
37		Muhammad Ali al-Halabi محمد علي الحلبي (1937–2016)	27 March 1978	9 January 1980	1 year, 288 days	Syrian Ba'ath Party (Syria Region)	Khleifawi II (Until 30 March 1978) al-Halabi		
38		Abdul Rauf al-Kasm عبد الرؤوف الكسم (1932–2025)	9 January 1980	1 November 1987	7 years, 296 days	Syrian Ba'ath Party (Syria Region)	al-Halabi (Until 14 January 1980) al-Kasm I–II–III		
39		Mahmoud Al-Zoubi محمود الزعبي (1935–2000)	1 November 1987	7 March 2000	12 years, 127 days	Syrian Ba'ath Party (Syria Region)	al-Zoubi I–II		
40		Muhammad Mustafa Mero محمد مصطفى ميرو (1941–2020)	7 March 2000	10 September 2003	3 years, 187 days	Syrian Ba'ath Party (Syria Region)	Mero I–II		
41		Muhammad Naji al-Otari محمد ناجي عطري (born 1944)	10 September 2003	14 April 2011	7 years, 216 days	Syrian Ba'ath Party (Syria Region)	al-Otari		
42		Adel Safar عادل سفر (born 1953)	14 April 2011	23 June 2012	1 year, 70 days	Syrian Ba'ath Party (Syria Region)	Safar		
43		Riyad Farid Hijab رياض فريد حجاب (born 1966)	23 June 2012	6 August 2012	44 days	Syrian Ba'ath Party (Syria Region)	Hijab	Defected to the opposition during the civil war.	
—		Omar Ibrahim Ghalawanji عمر ابراهيم غلاونجي (born 1954) acting	6 August 2012	9 August 2012	3 days	Independent	No cabinet		
44		Wael Nader al-Halqi وائل نادر الحلقي (born 1964)	9 August 2012	3 July 2016	3 years, 329 days	Syrian Ba'ath Party (Syria Region)	al-Halqi I–II		
45		Imad Khamis عماد خميس (born 1961)	3 July 2016	11 June 2020	3 years, 344 days	Syrian Ba'ath Party (Syria Region)	Khamis		
46		Hussein Arnous حسين عرنوس (born 1953)	11 June 2020	14 September 2024	4 years, 95 days	Syrian Ba'ath Party (Syria Region)	Arnous I–II		
47		Mohammad Ghazi al-Jalali محمد غازي الجلالي (born 1969)	14 September 2024	8 December 2024	85 days	Syrian Ba'ath Party (Syria Region)	Arnous II al-Jalali		

=== Transitional period (2024–2025) ===
No.	Portrait	Name (Birth–Death)	Term of office			Political party	Government	Notes	Ref.
No.	Portrait	Name (Birth–Death)	Took office	Left office	Time in office	Political party	Government	Notes	Ref.
Syrian Arab Republic (2024–2025)
—		Mohammad Ghazi al-Jalali محمد غازي الجلالي (born 1969) acting	8 December 2024	10 December 2024	2 days	Syrian Ba'ath Party (Syria Region)	Caretaker	Served as caretaker until al-Bashir assumed power.	
48		Mohammed al-Bashir محمد البشير (born 1983)	10 December 2024	29 March 2025	109 days	Hay'at Tahrir al-Sham	Caretaker	Previously Prime Minister of the Syrian Salvation Government.	
48		Mohammed al-Bashir محمد البشير (born 1983)	10 December 2024	29 March 2025	109 days	Independent	Caretaker	Previously Prime Minister of the Syrian Salvation Government.	
Position abolished (since 29 March 2025)

== See also ==
- President of Syria
  - List of presidents of Syria
- List of heads of state of Syria
- Vice President of Syria
- Prime Minister of Syria
- Speaker of the People's Assembly of Syria
