= The Ghoutas (Chamber of Deputies electoral district) =

Former electoral district of Syria's national legislature

- Former electoral district for the Chamber of Deputies

Former electoral district
- Created: 1954
- Abolished: 1963
- Seats: 3 (1954–1963)
- Created from: Damascus
- Replaced by: Rif Dimashq

The Ghoutas (Arabic: الغوطتان, lit. 'The two Ghoutas') was an electoral district used to elect members of the Syrian Chamber of Deputies between 1954 and 1963. The electoral district was first established as Markaz Damascus (The Ghoutas) in 1954 (Oct), and renamed The Ghoutas for the 1961 election.

== Electoral system ==
In 1947, the government of Jamil Mardam Bey introduced a new direct electoral system. The system was applied for the first time in the 1947 elections and was amended twice, in 1954 and 1961. It remained in force through the 1961 elections and until the fall of the Second Republic in 1963.

Until 1949, the electorate consisted of Syrian men aged 20 and over. Following Husni al-Za'im's seizure of power, the voting age was lowered to 18 and women were granted the right to vote. The subsequent Hashim al-Atassi government retained the lower voting age but restricted women's suffrage to literate women only, without the right to stand for election. It was not until the 1954 elections, held under the 1950 constitution, that women of all educational backgrounds were granted equal rights to vote and stand for office.

== Deputies ==
Elections	Deputy (Party)	Deputy (Party)	Deputy (Party)
1954 (Oct)	Abd al-Rauf Abu Tawq (Muslim Brotherhood)	Muhammad Abu Khayr al-Qahwaji (N/A)	Hanna al-Kaswani (N/A)
1955 (Feb) by-election	Abd al-Rauf Abu Tawq (Muslim Brotherhood)	Mazhar ash-Sharbaji (National Party)	Hanna al-Kaswani (N/A)
1955 (Apr) by-election	Abd al-Rauf Abu Tawq (Muslim Brotherhood)	Mazhar ash-Sharbaji (National Party)	Hanna al-Kaswani (N/A)
1955 (Jul) by-election	Abd al-Rauf Abu Tawq (Muslim Brotherhood)	Mazhar ash-Sharbaji (National Party)	Hanna al-Kaswani (N/A)
1961	Abd al-Rauf Abu Tawq (Muslim Brotherhood)	Mazhar ash-Sharbaji (National Party)	Muhammad Said al-Abbar (Muslim Brotherhood)
