= 1953 Syrian parliamentary election =

- 9 October 1953

All 82 seats in the Chamber of Deputies 42 seats needed for a majority
	First party	Second party	Third party
Party	Arab Liberation Movement	Independent	SSNP
Seats won	72	9	1
Seat change	▲72	▼22	Steady

Parliamentary elections were held in Syria on 9 October 1953. They were the elections held under the 1953 constitution, which granted universal suffrage to women, alongside scrapping educational requirements used in previous elections. Voter turnout was 16%.

The result was a victory for the Arab Liberation Movement, which won 72 of the 82 seats. The People's Party and the National Party were both closed down and prohibited from operating. Most of their leaders were imprisoned or under house arrest due to President Adib Shishakli's regime that came to power after a coup d'état 3 years earlier.

== Results ==
Party	Votes	%	Seats	+/–
Arab Liberation Movement			72	New
Syrian Social Nationalist Party			1	0
Syrian Communist Party			0	New
Independents			9	–22
Total			82	–32
Total votes	864,425	–		
Registered voters/turnout	995,417	86.84		
Source: Nohlen et al.
