= La Nation Arabe =

French language newspaper based in Geneva, Switzerland (1930–1938)

- Type: Monthly newspaper
- Editor-in-chief: Shakib Arslan; Ihsan Al Jabri
- Founded: 1930
- Ceased publication: 1938
- Political alignment: Arab nationalism
- Language: French
- Headquarters: Geneva
- Country: Switzerland

La Nation Arabe was an influential Pan-Islamic and Pan-Arabist Arab newspaper which was published in Geneva in the period 1930–1938.

== History ==
La Nation Arabe was first published in Geneva by Shakib Arslan and Ihsan Al Jabri in 1930. They also edited the paper. It intended to raise attention and action against European imperial control of Arab countries, and Zionist projects in the region of Palestine. The paper was published on a monthly basis.

La Nation Arabe contained a wide range of topics, including politics, literature, economics and social issues. It was widely read in Arab and European capitals despite being banned from French North Africa in the 1930s. It was influential in spreading new thoughts on Arab Nationalism, anti-Western imperialism, and Islamic self-assertiveness.
