= Nur al-Din Kahala =

Syrian politician (1908–1965)

- نور الدين كحالة
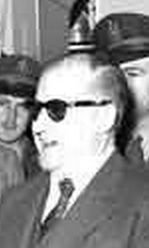

Chairman of the Executive Council of the Northern Region of the United Arab Republic
- In office 7 October 1958 – 20 September 1960
- Prime Minister: Gamal Abdel Nasser
- Preceded by: Sabri al-Asali
- Succeeded by: Abdel Hamid al-Sarraj

Personal details
- Born: 1908 Homs, Ottoman Syria
- Died: 1965 (aged 56–57) Damascus, Syria

Nur al-Din Kahala (Arabic: نور الدين كحالة; also known as Nureddin Kahalle; 1908–1965) was a Syrian politician during the United Arab Republic (UAR) period (1958–1961). Prior to the UAR period, he served as a minor government bureaucrat.

== Biography ==
Kahala graduated from Robert College in Istanbul, Turkey. Then he received engineering training in the United States. He represented Syria in the first meeting of the United Nations held in San Francisco, USA, in March 1945.

Kahala was initially appointed the President of the Northern Region (Syria) Executive Council, but on 19 July 1960, President Gamal Abdel Nasser appointed him as vice president in place of Akram al-Hawrani. He served alongside vice presidents Abdel Hakim Amer and Abdel Latif Boghdadi. On 20 September 1960 he was appointed the additional post of planning minister.

== Bibliography ==
- Amitai Etzioni (2001), Political Unification Revisited: On Building Supranational Communities, Lexington Books, ISBN 9780739102732
