= Abdul-Wahab Hawmad =

Syrian politician, lawyer, criminologist and professor

Abdul Wahhab Hawmad
- عَبْد الْوَهَّاب حَوْمَد
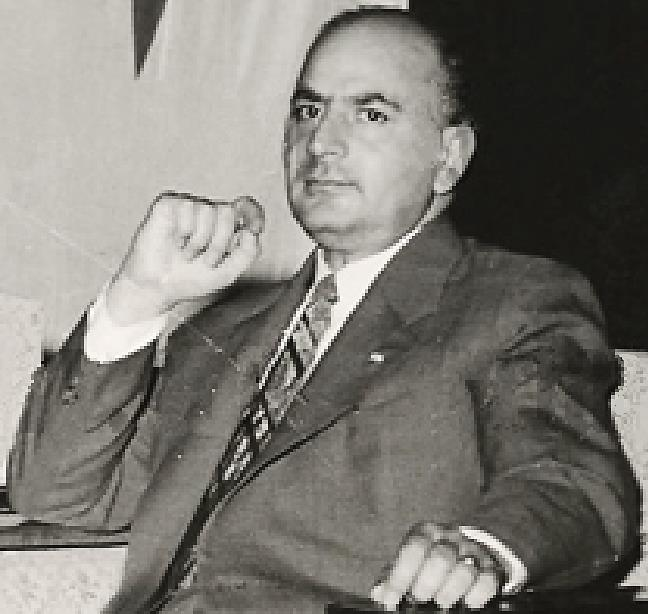
- Hawmad in 1957

Minister of Education
- In office September 1955 – June 1956
- Prime Minister: Said al-Ghazzi
- In office August 1951 – November 1951
- Prime Minister: Hasan al-Hakim

Minister of Finance
- In office 9 March 1963 – 11 May 1963
- Prime Minister: Salah al-Din al-Bitar
- Succeeded by: Mustafa al-Shamma
- In office June 1956 – December 1956
- Prime Minister: Sabri al-Asali

Minister of State for Planning
- In office 16 August 1958 – 20 September 1961
- Prime Minister: Nur al-Din Kahala; Abd al-Hamid Sarraj

Personal details
- Born: 1915 Ottoman Syria
- Died: February 2002 (aged 86–87) Syria
- Party: People's Party (1947–1958); National Union (1958–1961); United Arab Front (1962–1963)

Abdul-Wahhab Hawmad (Arabic: عَبْد الْوَهَّاب حَوْمَد ALA-LC: ʻAbd al-Wahhāb Ḥawmad) (1915 – February 2002) was a Syrian politician, lawyer, criminologist and professor.

== Background ==
Hawmad was born to father Mahmoud Hawmad in Aleppo, where he was raised, in 1915. Before his entry into politics, Hawmad worked as a lawyer, specializing in criminology. He graduated from the University of Paris with a law doctorate and a degree in criminal justice. He also studied Arabic literature at the university. When he returned to Syria, Hawmad also worked as a professor at the University of Damascus.

== Political career ==
=== People's Party ===
He became a founding member of the People's Party, part of its left-wing faction, in 1947, one year after Syria's independence from the French Mandate. The party's platform revolved around strengthening Syrian democracy, distributing political power—which was largely concentrated in the hands of Damascus-based politicians—throughout the country, and uniting with neighboring Iraq. It was allied and financed by the Hashemites, who were in power in both Iraq and Jordan. That same year, Hawmad won a seat representing Aleppo in the Parliament of Syria, which he kept until 1951. He won a seat at the Constitutional Assembly and took part in writing Syria's 1949 constitution. President Hashim al-Atasi subsequently rewarded Hawmad with the Syrian Republic Medal of Honor for Excellence, in recognition of his efforts.

After leaving Parliament, he was appointed education minister in Prime Minister Hasan al-Hakim's government. As education minister, Hawmad launched the largest foreign scholarship program in Syrian history, sending 300 students to the American and European universities. President Adib al-Shishakli, who came to power through military coup, had Hawmad arrested for his party's views, as part of a larger campaign to stem domestic dissent in the country. When Shishakli fled the country in February 1954, Hawmad was released.

Between September 1955 and June 1956, Hawmad served as finance minister in Prime Minister Said al-Ghazzi's cabinet, while in Prime Minister Sabri al-Asali's cabinet, between June and December 1956, he served as education minister. Along with Ma'rouf al-Dawalibi, Faydi al-Atasi and Ahmad Qanbar, Hawmad advocated that the nominally pro-Western party adopt neutralism in the Cold War, so as not to jeopardize Syrian relations with the Soviet Union. Together, they succeeded in preventing the ruling People's Party from aligning with the pro-Western camp.

=== Nasserism ===
In the late 1950s, Hawmad became a devoted Nasserist, a supporter of Egyptian President Gamal Abdel Nasser's pan-Arab leadership. This was a shift from his previous support for the Hashemites, Nasser's main Arab rivals at the time. He supported the union of Syria and Egypt into the United Arab Republic (UAR) in 1958, and became the only member of the People's Party (all parties were dissolved following the union's establishment) to serve in the UAR's Northern Region (Syrian) cabinet. On 16 August he was appointed Minister of State for Planning and was based in Cairo.

He returned to Damascus on 23 October 1961 following the UAR's dissolution. His former part colleague Nazim al-Qudsi became president following the Syrian coup that terminated the UAR. Hawmad did not rejoin the People's Party and opposed the secessionist government, openly calling for the UAR's reestablishment. Together with Nahid al-Qasim, a former colleague associated with the People's Party who also served in the UAR government, he founded the United Arab Front, one of a number of Nasserist parties that emerged after the secession. In 1962, unidentified assassins led an unsuccessful attempt to kill Hawmad by rigging his automobile with explosives.

On 8 March 1963, a coalition of Baʻthist, Nasserist and independent Arab nationalist officers launched a coup, overthrowing Qudsi's government. The new prime minister Salah al-Din al-Bitar, a Baʻthist, appointed Hawmad and Qasim to his cabinet. Hawmad served as finance minister. However, when the Baʻthist-dominated Military Committee—the secretive junta that virtually controlled Syria—purged dozens of Nasserists from the officer corps in April and May, Hawmad and four other Nasserist ministers resigned from their posts.

== Later life and death ==
After his resignation, Hawmad remained in Syria, continuing his law practice as well as his professorship at the University of Damascus. He was elected to the Arabic Language Assemblage, which is the "highest international scientific authority in the field of Arab language and literature", according to Sami Moubayed, in 1991. He oversaw academic research from Syria and was an active member of the organization until he died in February 2002.

== Bibliography ==
- Ginat, Rami (2010), Syria and the Doctrine of Arab Neutralism: From Independence to Dependence, Sussex Academic Press, ISBN 9781845193966
- Mufti, Malik (1996), Sovereign Creations: Pan-Arabism and Political Order in Syria and Iraq, Cornell University Press, ISBN 0801431689
- Moubayed, Sami M. (2006), Steel & Silk: Men & Women Who Shaped Syria 1900–2000, Cune Press, ISBN 1-885942-41-9
- Podeh, Elie (1999), The Decline of Arab Unity: The Rise and Fall of the United Arabic Republic, Sussex Academic Press, ISBN 1-902210-20-4
- Rabinovich, Itamar (1972), Syria Under the Baʻth, 1963-66: The Army Party Symbiosis, Transaction Publishers
- Simon, Reeva S.; Mattar, Phillip; Bulliet, Richard W. (1996), The encyclopedia of the modern Middle East, vol. 1, A–C, Macmillan Publishing Company, Incorporated, ISBN 9780028970615
