= Wahib al-Ghanim =

Syrian politician

Wahib al-Ghanim (1919-2003) born in Antakya was a Syrian physician and politician. He was one of the co-founders of the Ba'ath Party.

He was the spokesman for Zaki al-Arsuzi's grouping of Arab nationalists that "wanted a stronger dose of socialism than the Damascus leaders", namely Michel Aflaq and Salah al-Din Bitar, and made it a necessary condition for the unification of their respective camps into a single party.

From April 5–7, 1947, Ghanim, along with 247 others, took part in the founding conference of the Ba'ath Party, where he was elected to the executive committee, which also included Aflaq, Bitar, and Jalal al-Sayyid. In the same year, Ghanim created a Ba'athist cell in Latakia. Hafez al-Assad, the future president of Syria and the father of former president Bashar al-Assad, was one of the first to join.

During the parliamentary elections of 1947 and 1949, Ghanim unsuccessfully tried to become the deputy for Latakia. He was an opponent of Adib Shishakli, for which he faced persecution. In 1955 - after Shishakhli was deposed of - he joined the cabinet of Sabri al-Asali as health minister. Although Ghanim originally supported the 1958 union with Egypt, by 1961 he had changed his position and supported the coup that ended it.
