= 1954 Syrian parliamentary election =

- 24–25 September 1954 (first round); 4–5 October 1954 (second round)

All 140-142 seats in the Chamber of Deputies 72 seats needed for a majority
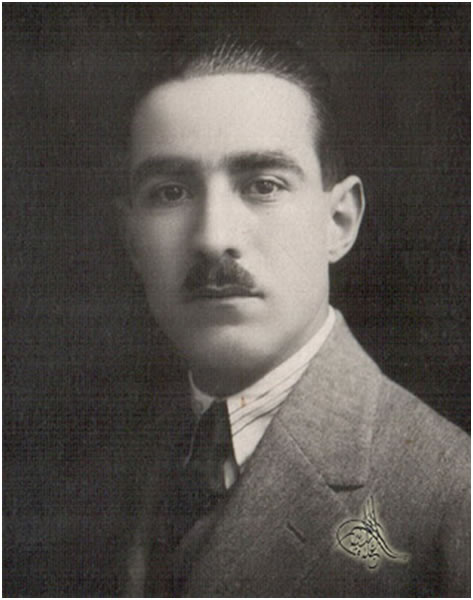

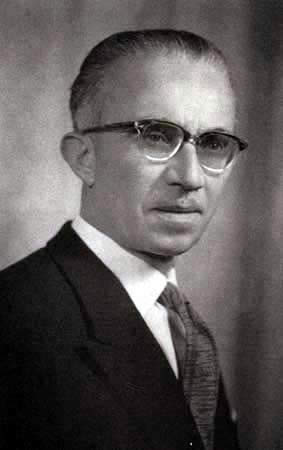

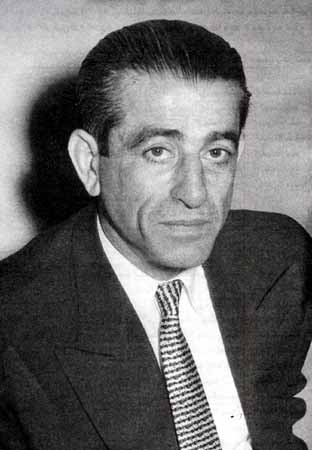

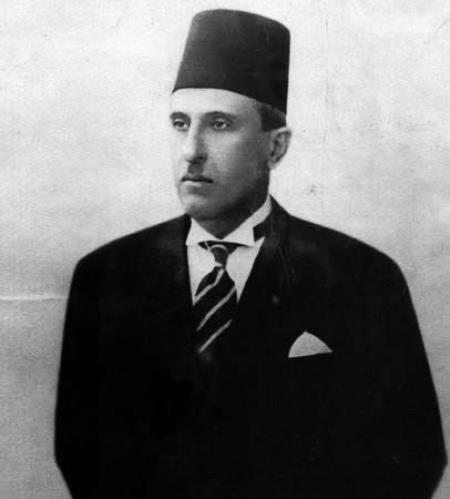
| | First party | Second party | Third party |
|---|---|---|---|
| Leader | Rushdi al-Kikhya; Nazim al-Kudsi | Akram El-Hourani | Shukri al-Quwatli |
| Party | People's | Ba'ath Party | National Party |
| Seats won | 30 | 22 | 19 |
Prime Minister before election
Said al-Ghazzi
Independent
Elected Prime Minister
Faris al-Khoury
People's

Parliamentary elections were held in Syria on 24 and 25 September 1954, with a second round held between 4 and 5 October. Independent candidates emerged as the largest bloc in Parliament, whilst the People's Party became the largest single party, with 30 seats. The Muslim Brotherhood did not participate as such.

There were 64 independents, of whom some were close to the Muslim Brotherhood or to other parties, which explains the discrepancies in the results in various books, and there were also 9 tribal deputies. Some sources mention 140 deputies in total, others 142.

== Results ==
| Party | Seats |
|---|---|
| People's Party | 30 |
| Ba'ath Party | 22 |
| National Party | 19 |
| Socialist Cooperation Party | 2 |
| Syrian Social Nationalist Party | 2 |
| Arab Liberation Movement | 2 |
| Syrian Communist Party | 1 |
| Muslim Brotherhood | 0 |
| Independents | 64 |
| Total | 142 |
Source: Nohlen et al.
