= Ali al-Dandachi =

- علي عبد الكريم الدندشي

Vice president of the Boy Scouts de Syrie

Ali Abdulkarim al-Dandachi (Arabic: علي عبد الكريم الدندشي; 1906 – February 8, 2000) was a Syrian who served as the vice president of the Boy Scouts de Syrie. Dandachi also served on the International Committee of the World Organization of the Scout Movement from 1951 to 1957. Dandachi had done a great deal to encourage Scouting throughout the Middle East, and during his term as a member of the International Committee, he visited practically every country in the region, leading to the establishment of an Arab Scout Bureau.

In 1969, Dandachi was awarded the Bronze Wolf, the only distinction of the World Organization of the Scout Movement, awarded by the World Scout Committee for exceptional services to world Scouting.
