= Mikhail Ilyan =

Syrian politician

Minister of Foreign Affairs
- In office August 26, 1945 – September 30, 1945
- President: Shukri al-Quwatli

Minister of Public Works
- In office April 26, 1946 – December 27, 1946
- President: Shukri al-Quwatli

Personal details
- Born: 1880 Aleppo, Ottoman Empire
- Died: Unknown Hatay, Turkey

Mikhail Ilyan or "Elian" (Arabic: ميخائيل اليان), was a Syrian politician who served as foreign minister of Syria in the 1940s.

== Biography ==
He was born in Aleppo in 1880 to a wealthy family. In 1928 he cofounded the National Bloc. He was elected as a member (MP) of the Syrian Parliament for many terms and in 1945 he served as minister of foreign affairs. In 1949 he was among the founders of Hizb al Watani (Arabic: The Nationalist Party). In 1956 he headed the Anglo-American sponsored coup in Syria.
