= Ihsan Al Jabri =

Syrian politician

- إحسان الجابري
- Born: 1879; Aleppo, Syria
- Died: 1980 (aged 100–101); Cario, Egypt
- Relatives: Saadallah al-Jabiri (brother)

Ihsan Al Jabri (Arabic: إحسان الجابري) (1879–1980) was a Syrian politician and nationalist. He was elected as a member (MP) of the Syrian Parliament in 1954 and was the mayor of Latakia in 1937

Al Jabri cofounded and coedited the newspaper La Nation Arabe with Shakib Arslan in Geneva in 1930. It intended to raise attention and action against European imperial control of Arab countries, and Zionist projects in the region of Palestine.
