= 1949 Syrian Constituent Assembly election =

- 16 November 1949

All 113 seats in the Constituent Assembly 57 seats needed for a majority
| | First party | Second party | Third party |
|---|---|---|---|
| Party | People's | Independent | National Party |
| Seats won | 53 | 31 | 13 |
| | Fourth party | Fifth party | Sixth party |
| Party | Muslim Brotherhood of Syria | Ba'ath Party | Syrian Social Nationalist Party |
| Seats won | 4 | 1 | 1 |

General elections were held in Syria on 15 and 16 November 1949 to elect its Constituent Assembly, with a second round on 25 November. The result was a victory for the People's Party, which won 63 of the 113 seats.

== Results ==
| Party | Seats |
|---|---|
| People's Party | 63 |
| National Party | 13 |
| Muslim Brotherhood of Syria | 4 |
| Ba'ath Party | 1 |
| Syrian Social Nationalist Party | 1 |
| Independents | 31 |
| Total | 113 |
Source: Nohlen et al.
