= Arab Liberation Movement =

Arab Liberation Movement حركة التحرر العربي
- Chairperson: Adib Shishakli
- Secretary-General: Maamun al-Kuzbari
- Founded: 25 August 1952
- Dissolved: 8 March 1963
- Headquarters: Damascus
- Newspaper: Al Tahrir al Arabi ("The Arab Liberation")
- Ideology: Syrian nationalism Modernization; Pro-Western Bloc
- Political position: Centre-right

The Arab Liberation Movement (Arabic: حركة التحرر العربي Ḥarakat Al-Tahrir Al-'Arabiy; French: Mouvement du liberation arabe) was a Syrian political party founded on 25 August 1952 by the President of Syria Adib Shishakli. It was the only legal party in Syria from its inception until 1954.

== History ==
Following his coup, Shishakli then dissolved all political parties and banned many newspapers, in a return to military rule. Among those to suffer persecution under his rule were the National Party of Damascus, the People's Party of Aleppo, the Communist Party, the Ba'ath Party, and the Syrian Muslim Brotherhood. He also outlawed all newspapers that were not pro-Shishakli, and banished the Ba'ath leaders Akram al-Hawrani, Michel Aflaq, and Salah al-Bitar to Lebanon, where they then actively worked against his government.

He was a skilled public speaker, however, and relied greatly on the radio to transmit his speeches to every-day Syrians. On 25 August 1952, he established an official government party, the Arab Liberation Movement, but it was boycotted by powerful representatives of the civilian political society, such as Hashim al-Atassi. The party was progressive and accepted women among its ranks and calling for a limited degree of socialism. Some said that he viewed himself as "an Arab Caesar." In mid-1953 Shishakli staged an election to make himself President, but he was by now facing mounting dissent.

Shishakli continued to rule the country until 1954, when growing public opposition forced him to resign and leave the country. The national government was restored, but again to face instability, this time coming from abroad. After the overthrow of President Shishakli in a 1954 coup, continued political maneuvering supported by competing factions in the military eventually brought Arab nationalist and socialist elements to power.

Growing discontent eventually led to another coup, in which Shishakli was overthrown in February 1954. The plotters included members of the Syrian Communist Party, Druze officers, and Ba'ath Party members and possibly had Iraqi backing. He had also arrested a lot of active officers in the Syrian Army, including the rising young Adnan al-Malki, also a prominent Baathist. Leading the anti-Shishakli movement were former President Atassi and the veteran Druze leader Sultan al-Atrash. The largest anti-Shishakli conference had been held in Atassi's home in Homs. Shishakli had responded by arresting Atassi and Atrash's sons, Adnan and Mansur, both of whom were ranking politicians in Syria.

When the insurgency reached its peak, Shishakli backed down, refusing to drag Syria into civil war. He fled to Lebanon, but when the Druze leader Kamal Jumblat threatened to have him killed, he fled to Brazil. Prior to the union between Syria and Egypt in 1958, Shishakli had planned to return to Syria and launch another coup d'état using funds provided by Iraq. The coup was foiled by Syrian intelligence and Shishakli was sentenced to death in absentia.

The party obtained two seats in the Chamber of Deputies, now the People's Assembly, in the 1954 Syrian parliamentary election. In 1958, following the unification of Syria with Egypt to form the United Arab Republic, the party was banned by the Egyptian President Gamal Abdel Nasser.

In the 1961 Syrian parliamentary election, the party would gain an additional two seats, with four seats in total in the Constituent and Parliamentary Assembly, the superseding legislative body of the Chamber of Deputies and the predecessor of the People's Assembly.

The party was dissolved on March 8, 1963, following the 1963 Syrian coup d'état.

== Electoral history ==
=== Presidential elections ===
Election	Party candidate	Votes	%	Result
1953	Adib Shishakli	861,910	99.7%	Elected ✓

=== Syrian parliamentary elections ===
Election	Party leader	Seats	+/–	Position
1953	Adib Shishakli	72 / 82	▲72	▲1st
1954	Adib Shishakli	2 / 142	▼70	▼7th
1961	Adib Shishakli	4 / 172	▲2	▲5th
