= Ahmad Qanbar =

Syrian Politician

- احمد قنبر

Minister of Interior
- In office 22 December 1961 – 27 March 1962
- President: Nazim al-Kudsi

Personal details
- Born: 1900
- Died: 1971 (aged 70–71)

Ahmad Qanbar (Arabic: أحمد قنبر; 1900–1971) was a Syrian politician and journalist served as interior minister for five times.

== Career ==
He started his career by establishing a newspaper in Aleppo named Al Nazir in 1937. In 1947, he became a founding member of the People's Party, one year after Syria's independence from the French Mandate. The party's platform revolved around strengthening Syrian democracy, distributing political power—which was largely concentrated in the hands of Damascus-based politicians—throughout the country, and uniting with neighboring Iraq. It was allied and financed by the Hashemites, who were in power in both Iraq and Jordan.

He was elected in the parliament from 1947 to 1961, and served as interior minister for five terms between in 1950s and 1960s.

In 1963, Qanbar's civil rights were terminated after coup of al Baath party.
