= Sabri al-Asali =

Syrian politician (1903–1976)

- صبري العسلي
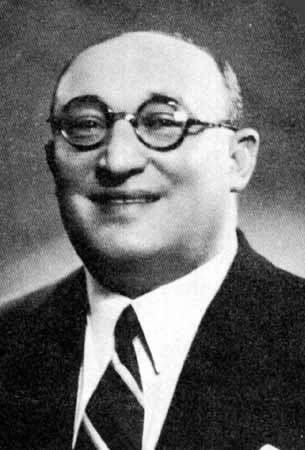
- Al-Asali in 1963

23rd Prime Minister of Syria
- In office 14 June 1956 – 1 February 1958
- President: Shukri al-Quwatli
- Preceded by: Said al-Ghazzi
- Succeeded by: Nur al-Din Kahala
- In office 13 February 1955 – 13 September 1955
- President: Shukri al-Quwatli
- Preceded by: Faris al-Khoury
- Succeeded by: Said al-Ghazzi
- In office 1 March 1954 – 19 June 1954
- President: Hashim al-Atassi
- Preceded by: Adib al-Shishakli
- Succeeded by: Said al-Ghazzi

Vice President of the United Arab Republic
- In office 7 March 1958 – 7 October 1958
- Preceded by: Office established
- Succeeded by: Akram al-Hawrani

Personal details
- Born: 1903 Damascus, Ottoman Syria
- Died: 13 April 1976 (aged 72–73) Damascus, Syria
- Party: National Bloc; National Party

Sabri al-Asali (Arabic: صبري العسلي; 1903 – 13 April 1976) was a Syrian politician and a three-time prime minister of Syria. He also served as vice-president of the United Arab Republic in 1958.

== Early life ==
Al-Asali was born into a wealthy landowning family in Damascus. The Al-Asalis originated from the village of Yalda in the outskirts of Damascus, known as the Al-Charkatli family. They relocated to Damascus in the year 1062 AH (Islamic calendar), and they still have endowments in Yalda. His uncle, Shukri al-Asali, was a prominent national leader, and a deputy in the Ottoman Parliament. Shukri al-Asali and a number of other nationalist leaders were executed in Damascus and Beirut by the Ottoman wāli, Jamal Pasha, on 6 May 1916.

Sabri al-Asali attended Damascus University and graduated with a law degree in 1925. That same year the Great Syrian Revolt against the French occupation erupted, and al-Asali participated in the uprising by helping smuggle arms and supplies to the Syrian fighters in the Ghouta area. Following the suppression of the revolt, al-Asali was exiled by the French authorities to Saudi Arabia where he became a special advisor to the Saudi King Abd al-Aziz, alongside another exiled Syrian leader, Shukri al-Quwatli.

== Career ==
=== French Mandate ===
Al-Asali and Quwatli returned to Syria in 1932 following a general amnesty. In 1933 al-Asali, along with a number of influential Arab thinkers, became a founding member and general-secretary of the League of National Action, with the aim of countering European colonial influence. Other founding members included the historian and professor Constantin Zureiq, the philosopher Zaki al-Arsuzi and the politician Muhsin al-Barazi. The League was very successful in Syria and Lebanon, and called for the abolition of the French and British mandates and the economic integration of Arab countries.

In 1936 Quwatli invited al-Asali to join the National Bloc, an umbrella group that led the political struggle against the French occupation. Al-Asali ran for parliament as a member of the Bloc and won a seat in the 1936 elections, and again in 1943, 1947, 1954, and 1962. Al-Asali served as minister of interior in the cabinet of Faris al-Khoury, and later he became minister of justice and education. In the cabinet of Saadallah al-Jabiri that was formed in October 1945, al-Asali again held the portfolios of justice and education. Al-Asali was part of the Syrian delegation that attended the founding of the Arab League in Cairo in 1945.

=== Independence ===
Syria regained its independence in April 1946, and al-Jabiri formed the first cabinet in post-occupation Syria, appointing al-Asali as minister of interior where he served until November 1946. When the National Bloc split to form two competing parties, the National Party and the People's Party, al-Asali joined Quwatli's National Party and led its opposition to the Hashemite influence in Syria.

In 1948 al-Asali was again appointed the interior portfolio by Prime Minister Jamil Mardam Bey. His term was marred by domestic unrest resulting from the 1948 Arab-Israeli War. Al-Asali used a hardline approach and cracked down on the opposition. Many leading socialists were arrested on his orders, including Michel Aflaq of the Baath Party, whose arrest prompted dissent inside the cabinet and the resignation of Lutfi al-Haffar, Mardam Bey's deputy. As the turmoil spread further, al-Asali deployed the army in the streets. He became very unpopular and only narrowly survived several attempts on his life in 1948. In 1949 Chief of Staff Husni al-Za'im led a military coup that overthrew the Quwatli government. Al-Asali, along with most of Quwatli's associates, was arrested. He remained under house arrest until al-Za'im's government was overthrown by another military coup. Under the military government of Adib Shishakli, al-Asali allied himself with former president Hashim al-Atassi and conspired to bring down the Shishakli government, and restore a civilian administration to Syria.

==== Premiership ====
The Shishakli government was overthrown by a military coup in 1954. Al-Atassi was elected president and he asked al-Asali to form a cabinet. His tenure saw the assassination of Colonel Adnan al-Malki, the deputy-chief of staff, by a member of the Syrian Social Nationalist Party (SSNP). The "Malki affair" caused outrage in the military. Al-Asali appointed Abdel Hamid al-Sarraj to lead an official tribunal which identified the SSNP with backing of the United States as the main culprits. The SSNP was outlawed and its entire leadership was arrested. During his first term as prime minister, al-Asali allied himself with the strong military, which secured him a second term in 1956.

==== Nasserism ====
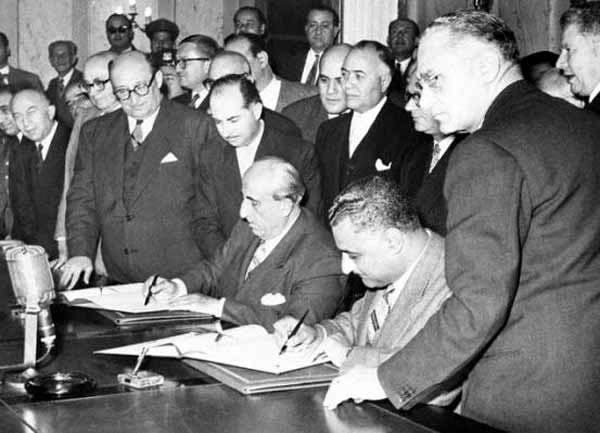
Al-Asali stands next to Syrian president al-Quwatli (seated left) who, alongside Egyptian president Nasser (seated right), is signing the agreement uniting Egypt and Syria to form the United Arab Republic, 1958

Al-Asali spearheaded the Nasserist movement in Syria following the 1956 Suez Crisis, and Nasserist officials and army officers were promoted during his tenure. He was credited with convincing Quwatli, another pro-Nasser leader, to run for president again in 1955. Quwatli appointed al-Asali as his first prime minister after taking office. In January 1958 he appointed socialist leader Salah al-Din al-Bitar as foreign minister and tasked him with negotiating a full union between Egypt and Syria. President al-Quwatli and al-Asali travelled to Cairo to finalize the agreement and announced the United Arab Republic, under the leadership of Gamal Abd al-Nasser, on 1 February 1958. Al-Asali was appointed vice-president by Nasser the following day. He resigned on 7 October 1958.

In 1959 released documents from 1951 appeared to link him with the Iraqi government. His opponents accused him of receiving illicit funds and forced him to resign. In 1960 Al-Asali joined the Syrian opposition to the Nasser government and accused Nasser of establishing dictatorial rule in Syria. He supported the 1961 coup d'état that ended the union and signed the secession declaration.

== Later years ==
During the secession years al-Asali was elected to parliament but never served in any cabinet. Following the 1963 Ba'athist-led coup d'état in Syria, Sabri al-Asali, considered a collaborator with the secessionist government, had his property confiscated and his civil rights revoked. He retired from public life and died in Damascus on 13 April 1976.

Political offices
Preceded by Adib al-Shishakli	Prime Minister of Syria; 1 March 1954 – 19 June 1954	Succeeded by Said al-Ghazzi
Preceded by Faris al-Khoury	Prime Minister of Syria; 13 February 1955 – 13 September 1955	Succeeded by Said al-Ghazzi
Preceded by Said al-Ghazzi	Prime Minister of Syria; 14 June 1956 – 1 February 1958	Succeeded by Gamal Abdel Nasser
Preceded by Office established	Vice President of the United Arab Republic; 7 March 1958 – 7 October 1958	Succeeded by Akram al-Hawrani
