= Said al-Ghazzi =

Syrian politician (1893–1967)

- سعيد الغزي
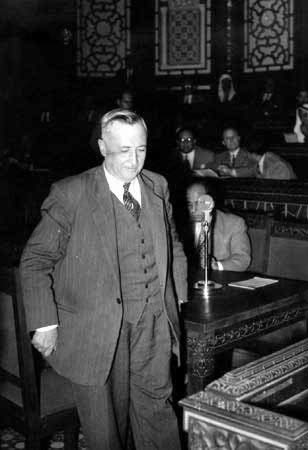
- al-Ghazzi inside the Chamber of Deputies in 1956

Prime Minister of Syria
- In office 19 June 1954 – 3 November 1954
- President: Hashim al-Atassi
- Preceded by: Sabri al-Assali
- Succeeded by: Faris al-Khoury
- In office 13 September 1955 – 14 June 1956
- President: Shukri al-Quwatli
- Preceded by: Sabri al-Assali
- Succeeded by: Sabri al-Assali

Speaker of the Parliament of Syria
- In office September 17, 1962 – March 7, 1963
- Preceded by: Maamun al-Kuzbari
- Succeeded by: Mansur al-Atrash

Personal details
- Born: 11 June 1893 Damascus, Ottoman Syria
- Died: 18 September 1967 (aged 74)
- Party: Independent

Said Al-Ghazzi (Arabic: سعيد الغزي; 11 June 1893 – 18 September 1967) was a Syrian politician, lawyer and two-time prime minister of Syria. He was born in Damascus, and was of Turkish origin.

== Early life ==
Said belonged to the prominent al-Ghazzi family, which was established in Damascus since the 14th century and which historically provided the leadership of the Shafi'i madhhab (school of law) and produced dozens of noted scholars over the centuries. In the late 19th and early 20th century members of the family consistently held a seat in the municipal council and became increasingly involved in politics.

Sa'id's great-grandfather Umar was the mufti of the Shafi'is and was considered by a biographer to be the most preeminent of the notables of Damascus in his lifetime. He was implicated in the 1860 massacres of Christians in the city and imprisoned in Cyprus where he died the following year. Sa'id's eponymous grandfather voluntarily accompanied his father Umar but nothing more is heard of him. His son Abd al-Wahab was Sa'id's father.

== Political career ==
A lawyer by occupation, Sa'id entered politics during French rule and following Syrian independence in 1946. He served as the justice minister in 1936, 1945 and 1947. In 1946 he served as the finance minister, later serving as the national economy minister in 1947.

In 1954 he was elected as the prime minister of Syria, succeeding Sabri al-Asali. The following year, he was then appointed as the foreign minister. In 1962, Sa'id served as the president of the Speaker of the Constituent and Parliamentary Assembly.

== Personal life and family ==
His daughter Nadia al-Ghazzi is a lawyer, writer, and TV presenter, and his niece is the poet and artist Huda Naamani.

== Bibliography ==
- Schilcher, Linda Schatowski (1985). Families in Politics: Damascene Factions and Estates of the 18th and 19th Centuries. Franz Steiner. ISBN 3-515-03146-4.
- Media related to Said al-Ghazzi at Wikimedia Commons

Political offices
Preceded by Sabri al-Assali	Prime Minister of Syria; 19 June 1954 – 3 November 1954	Succeeded by Faris al-Khoury
Preceded by Sabri al-Assali	Prime Minister of Syria; 13 September 1955 – 14 June 1956	Succeeded by Sabri al-Assali
