= Socialist Cooperation Party =

Socialist Cooperation Party حزب التعاون الاشتراكي
- Leader: Faisal Hekmat Al-Asali
- Founded: 1948
- Dissolved: 8 March 1963
- Headquarters: Damascus, Syria
- Ideology: Social democracy Islamic socialism
- Political position: Centre-left

The Socialist Cooperation Party (Arabic: حزب التعاون الاشتراكي Hizb Al-Ta'awun Al-Ishtirakiy) was a political party founded in Damascus, Syria in March 1948 by Faisal Hekmat Al-Asali. Its members were primarily students, intellectuals, and wageworkers in the country. After the Syrian parliamentary election, the Socialist Cooperation Party held two seats in the Syrian Parliament.

The party was banned in February 1958 by the President of the United Arab Republic Gamal Abdel Nasser, after the merging between Syria and Egypt, but refounded in 1961 and gained no seats after the 1961 Syrian parliamentary election. The Socialist Cooperation Party was dissolved on 8 March 1963, after the Ba'athist coup.

== See also ==
- List of Islamic political parties
