= Akram al-Hourani =

Syrian politician (1912–1996)

- أكرم الحوراني
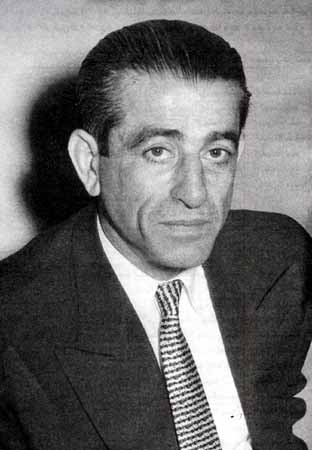

Vice President of the United Arab Republic
- In office 7 March 1958 – 19 September 1960

President of the Chamber of Deputies
- In office 14 October 1957 – 20 July 1960
- Preceded by: Nazim al-Kudsi
- Succeeded by: Anwar Sadat

Member of the People's Council for Hama
- In office July 1947 – October 1953
- In office November 1954 – 1963

Member of the National Command of the Arab Socialist Ba'ath Party
- In office 1952 – 1 September 1959

Minister of Defence
- In office 28 December 1949 – 4 June 1950
- President: Hashim al-Atassi
- Prime Minister: Khalid al-Azm
- Preceded by: Abdullah Atfeh
- Succeeded by: Fawzi Selu

Personal details
- Born: 4 November 1911 Hama, Ottoman Syria
- Died: 24 February 1996 (aged 84) Amman, Jordan
- Party: Arab Socialist Party (1936–52); Syrian Regional Branch of the Arab Socialist Ba'ath Party(1952–62); Arab Socialist Party (1962–63)
- Spouse: Naziha Al-Houmsi

Akram Al-Hourani (Arabic: أكرم الحوراني, romanized: ʾAkram al-Ḥurānī, also transcribed El-Hourani, Howrani or Hurani) (November 1911 – 24 February 1996), was a Syrian politician who played a prominent role during the democratic era of Syria in the 1950s, he established and led the Arab Socialist Party. He was a highly influential figure in the Syrian politics from the beginning of the 1940s until his departure into exile in 1963, during this period he was able to introduce significant reforms towards more just and fairer society especially in relation to the agricultural sector and land redistribution against the feudal system. Al-Hourani held various positions as a member of the Syrian parliament, the head of the parliament, minister of agriculture, minister of defence, and the vice-president of the United Arab Republic.

== Background ==
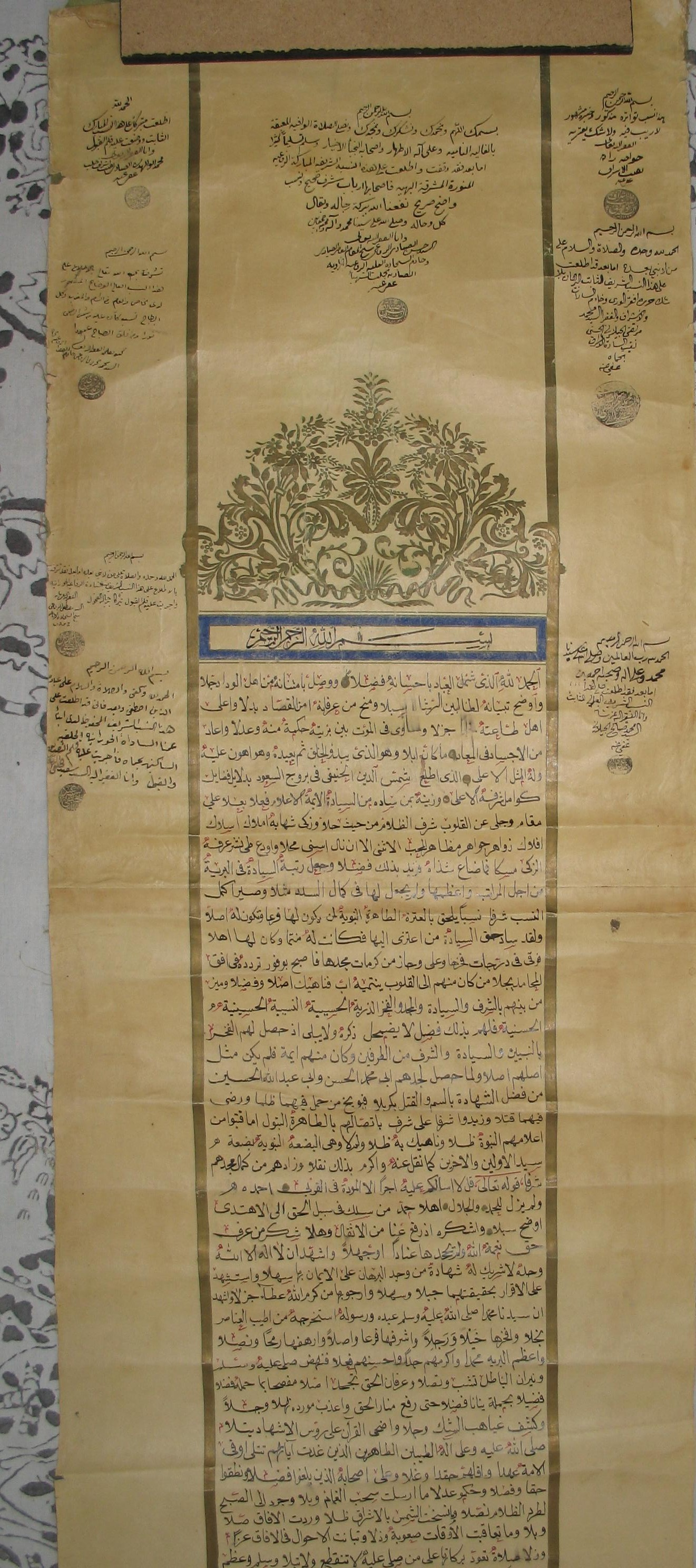
An Al-Hourani family tree from 1519 claiming the family is descended from Muhammad.

Al-Hourani's family had its origins in the Arab al-Halqiyyin tribe and moved to Hama in central Syria from the town of Jasim in the southern Hawran region around 1510s (hence the surname Al-Hourani.) The Al-Hourani family claimed to be descended from Muhammad in a family tree displayed in the museum of Hama. Akram Al-Hourani himself was born in Hama and grew up in modest circumstances as the family's wealth had dissipated. He was educated in Hama and Damascus. His father Muhammad Rasheed Al-Hourani was a merchant who gradually bought agricultural lands and was fluent in Arabic and Turkish languages owning a large book collection, he died one year after the start of World War I (in 1915) due to an infection while distributing aid to the Armenian genocide survivors in Hama, Al-Hourani was only 4 years old when his father died.

In 1936, he enrolled in the Damascus Law School, and became a member of the Parti Populaire Syrien (PPS) (later known as the Syrian Social National Party) which he regretted later. In 1938 he left the party and returned to Hama to practice law. There he took over the Hizb al-Shabab (Youth Party) founded by his cousin Othman Al-Hourani which constituted the seed for the Arab Socialist Party.

The province of Hama in the earlier part of the twentieth century was characterised by feudalism, with landlords owning most of the land. The landlords exercised complete control over the peasantry, backed up by what amounted to private armies. Al-Hourani set about attacking this system and called for agrarian reforms, giving him considerable popular support in Hama and its province, and in 1943 he was elected as a deputy to the Syrian Parliament. He retained his seat in the elections of 1947, 1949, 1954, and 1962.

While it was in defence of social justice in his home region that Al-Hourani made his name, he also had a strong Arab nationalist outlook.

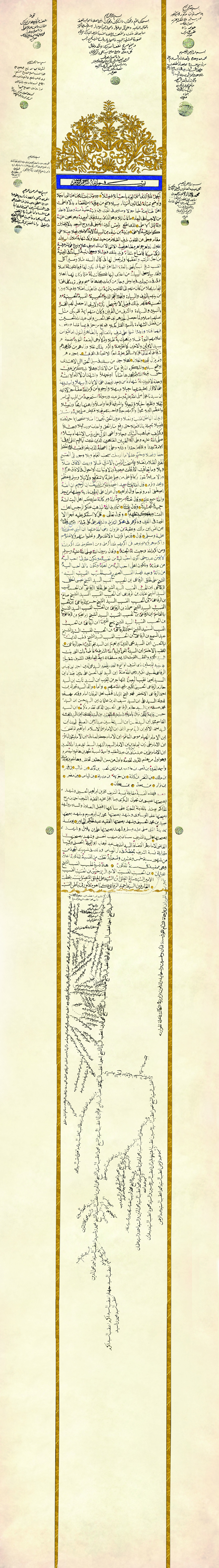
A digital reconstruction of Al-Hourani family tree, the original document is created back in 1519 and displayed in the National Museum of Hama. The tree is partially updated in 2022.

== Closer to power ==
In 1950 Al-Hourani renamed his party the Arab Socialist Party; at that point, Batatu states, "it counted no fewer than 10,000 members and was able to attract as many as 40,000 people from the countryside when in the same year it convoked at Aleppo the first peasant congress in Syrian history."

Between 1949 and 1954 Syrian politics was punctuated by four military coups. Based on his strong influence in the army, Al-Hourani was wrongly considered to have played a part in these coups, there is no concrete evidence to support his involvement. He was initially particularly close to the leader of the third and fourth coups, Adib al-Shishakli, who effectively ruled Syria from 1951 until 1954. Al-Shishakli's decision to sign a decree distributing state lands to the peasantry in January 1952 appears to have been under al-Hawrani's influence. However, as the dictator grew more autocratic his influence waned, and when al-Shishakli decided to ban the Arab Socialist Party in April 1952, he went into exile in Lebanon. There, in November that year, he agreed to merge the Arab Socialist Party with the Arab Ba'ath Party led by Michel Aflaq and Salah al-Din al-Bitar. The latter thus gained a substantial base of active supporters for the first time. The unified party adopted the name Arab Ba'ath Socialist Party. It was disbanded, along with all Syrian political parties by president Nasser in 1958. The relation between Al-Hourani and Aflaq ended acrimoniously in 1962. In fact, Al-Hourani firmly rejected the ascension to power using military coups, this is exemplified by his firm opposition to what is known as the "Qatna mutiny" which was a series of events and military deployments in 1957 orchestrated by high ranking officers in the army (which were members / sympathizers with the Arab Socialist Party) to take control of the government.

== The Arab Ba'ath Socialist Party ==
Al-Hourani was a member of the Ba'ath Party national command, meaning its pan-Arab leadership, from its establishment in 1954 until 1959. Along with the other Ba'athists and members of most of Syria's political forces, he played a prominent role in the agitation and political mobilization that forced al-Shishakli to give up power in early 1954. He was speaker of the Syrian parliament from 1957 to February 1958. In that position, Al-Hourani was able to influence the introduction of social and economical progressive reforms.

== The United Arab Republic ==
After the treaty of union between Syria and Egypt in 1958 Al-Hourani became vice-president of the United Arab Republic (UAR) under Gamal Abdel Nasser, a post he held until 1959. After Nasser launched a bitter verbal attack on the Ba'ath Party in December that year, followed by a campaign of repression against its members, he resigned his position and went into exile in Lebanon. He subsequently differed with Aflaq and al-Bitar over the party's position regarding the UAR, due to his support for secession from the UAR.

When a 1961 military coup in Syria led to the dissolution of the UAR, Al-Hourani publicly supported it and signed a statement in favor of the secession (as did Bitar, but he later withdrew his signature). The Ba'ath Party split into several competing factions, but as the national command decided in favour of reunification, Al-Hourani left it. He was officially expelled in June 1962, whereafter he and his loyalists re-established the Arab Socialist Party. However, popular support for unity hampered its growth and it was strong only in his original stronghold of Hama. In September 1962 he joined the "secessionist" (infisali) cabinet formed by Khalid al-Azm, drawing strong criticism from the Ba'athist and Nasserist movements.

In the year 1963, and following the military coup that brought the Ba'ath to power, Al-Hourani was arrested and put in the Mezzah Prison, before being exiled from Syria. He spent the final years of his life in Amman, Jordan, where he eventually died in 1996.

== Sources ==
- Batatu, Hanna, The Old Social Classes and New Revolutionary Movements in Iraq, Saqi Books, London, 2000
- Seale, Patrick, Asad: the struggle for the Middle East, California University Press, Berkeley, 1990. ISBN 0-520-06976-5
- Mufti, Malik, Sovereign Creations: Pan-Arabism and Political Order in Syria and Iraq, Cornell University Press: Ithaca, 1996. ISBN 0-8014-3168-9
- "Akram al-Hawrani", from the Syrian Encyclopedia
- Al-Hournai, Akram, "Akram Al-Hourani Memoirs", Madbouly Bookshop, 2000
