= Syrian Communist Party =

Political party in Syria (1944–1986)

Syrian Communist Party الحزب الشيوعي السوري
- Founder: Khalid Bakdash
- Founded: 1944
- Dissolved: 1986
- Preceded by: Syrian–Lebanese Communist Party
- Succeeded by: Split into two factions: the Syrian Communist Party (Unified) and the Syrian Communist Party (Bakdash)
- Ideology: Communism; Marxism–Leninism
- Political position: Far-left
- National affiliation: National Progressive Front

Party flag

The Syrian Communist Party (Arabic: الحزب الشيوعي السوري, romanized: al-Ḥizb aš-Šuyūʿī as-Sūrī) was a political party in Syria founded in 1944 as a division of the Syrian–Lebanese Communist Party, which later split into the Syrian Communist Party and the Lebanese Communist Party.

In 1972, it became a member of the National Progressive Front, the coalition of parties sanctioned by the Ba'athist regime. The party split in two in 1986 with two separate parties claiming to represent the original Syrian Communist Party; the Syrian Communist Party (Unified) and the Syrian Communist Party (Bakdash).

== Beginnings ==
The party evolved out of the Communist Party of Syria and Lebanon, founded in Beirut in 1924. It was suppressed shortly afterwards, but was revived after an interlude of several years. In 1936, Khalid Bakdash, a Damascene who had been recruited to the party in 1930 and later studied at the Communist University of the Toilers of the East in Moscow, took control as secretary of the party, and set about building up its organisation.

== Bakdash's leadership and organisational growth ==
The party was involved in opposition to the Vichy French presence in Syria, and when the Free French took control of the country it was legalised. In 1944, the Syrian and Lebanese parties became separate organisations. Bakdash sought to present the Syrian Communist Party as an essential part of the national movement, in the context of Syria's struggle against the French mandate. The party adopted a moderate programme and opened its ranks to all those accepting it, rather than functioning as a restricted Leninist vanguard organisation. It built up a significant support base among the working class, Kurds and intellectuals.

In 1954, after a series of military dictatorships that had lasted since 1949, Syria became a democracy, and in the elections held that year, Khalid Bakdash won a seat in parliament for the Damascus area, becoming the first communist elected to an Arab parliament. The party was cautious about proposals to unify Syria with Gamal Abdal Nasser's Egypt, the main political question of the 1950s in Syria. The Egyptian Communist Party was banned under Nasser, and communists and other leftists had been jailed in large numbers. However, popular desire for unity was such that the party felt it could not afford to oppose it outright.

== Suppression under Nasser and the Ba'ath and tolerance by the Neo Ba'ath 1958–1970 ==
The United Arab Republic (UAR) was formed in February 1958. Toward the end of 1958, a campaign of repression against the party began. Nasser was provoked to action by a harshly critical statement made by Bakdash, who called for transformation of the UAR into a loose federation. Communists were imprisoned and in some cases killed.

The union ended in 1961 when a coup led to Syria's secession. The Communist Party was strongly identified with the secessionist tendency and suffered a loss of popular support and membership as a result. Worse was to follow, when the pro-unification coup of 1963 brought a military-based government consisting largely of Ba'athists and Nasserists to power and the party was once again repressed.

In 1966, the Syrian Ba'ath's secret military committee took power, and implemented a far-left line. Bakdash was allowed to return from Moscow, but forbidden from engaging in public political activity.

== Legal operation in the National Progressive Front from 1972 ==
In 1970, Hafez al-Assad came to power in Syria and announced his intention of allowing limited political pluralism in the context of popular democracy. This took the form of the National Progressive Front, established in 1972. Only parties participating in the Front would be allowed to operate: to join, they were required to accept the socialist and Arab nationalist orientation of the government. The Ba'ath Party was guaranteed leadership of the Front and the new constitution, promulgated the same year, provided that it would "lead society and the state". Furthermore, only the Ba'ath would be allowed operate in the armed forces and among university students.

Faced with the choice between accepting these restrictions and the prospect of illegal operation, Bakdash and the majority of the party chose to join the Front. The more radical elements in the party were unhappy about participation in the Front. However, the breaking point did not come until 1976 and the Syrian intervention in the Lebanese Civil War on the side of rightist, Maronite-led elements against the nationalist bloc and its allies in the Palestine Liberation Organization. This was too much for the radicals, and Riyad al-Turk led them into opposition. His faction was termed the Syrian Communist Party (Political Bureau) or Syrian Communist Party (Riyad al-Turk).

== The 1980s: repression and split ==
During the early 1980s, the Syrian government clamped down on political activity and the Communist Party was subject to severe restrictions, despite its participation in the NPF. It was prevented from publishing its newspapers Nidhal ash-Sha'b ("the People's Struggle") and an-Nour ("the Light"), and its activities were closely monitored by the security services. It effectively operated underground throughout most of the 1980s, with membership lists a closely guarded secret. In 1986, the anti-communist crackdown ended and the ban on the communist party was lifted by Assad as a concession to the Soviets.

In 1986, Bakdash and deputy secretary Yusuf Faisal differed over the policies of perestroika and glasnost adopted by Soviet Communist Party general secretary Mikhail Gorbachev. Faisal was supportive of Gorbachev's reforms, while Bakdash was opposed. This led to another split in the party, with many of the party's intellectuals leaving with Faisal to the Syrian Communist Party (Unified) while much of its Kurdish base remained supportive of Bakdash in the Syrian Communist Party (Bakdash).

== Sources ==
- Velasco Muñoz, Rosa (2019). "The Syrian Communist Party". In: Communist Parties in the Middle East: 100 Years of History. Oxford: Routledge. pp. 109–128. ISBN 9780367134457.
