= National Party (Syria) =

National Party حزب الوطني
- Leader: Shukri al-Quwatli
- Founded: 1947
- Dissolved: 1963
- Preceded by: National Bloc
- Headquarters: Damascus
- Ideology: Syrian nationalism Arab nationalism Pan-Arabism; Civic nationalism Pro-Eastern Bloc; Conservatism; National conservatism Republicanism; Secularism; Faction: Pro-Nasserism (Sabri al-Asali)
- Political position: Centre-right

The National Party (Arabic: الحزب الوطني al-Ḥizb al-Waṭanī; French: Parti National) was a Syrian political party founded in 1947, eventually dissolving in 1963, after the Syrian Ba'ath Party established one-party rule in Syria in a coup d'état.

== History ==
The National Party originally grew out of the National Bloc, which opposed the Ottomans in Syria, and later demanded independence from the French mandate. The party saw the greatest support among the Damascene old guard and industrialists. It supported closer ties with the Arab countries and territories to Syria's south, mainly Saudi Arabia, Egypt, Lebanon, and Palestine, although it began supporting Hashemite-ruled Iraq and Jordan starting in 1949 amongst growing public support.

While the dominant party in 1940s and early 1950s, it was replaced by its rival, the People's Party, thereafter. Similar to the People's Party, the National Party was also supported by landowners and landlords.

In 1936, leaders of the National Bloc (Hashim al-Atassi, Saadallah al-Jabiri, Lutfi al-Haffar, Jamil Mardam Bey, Shukri al-Quwatli, Nasib al-Bakri, Ibrahim Hananu, Sultan Basha al-Atrash, Faris al-Khoury, Saleh al-Ali, Faisal Najib, Honorary Sami Al Baroudi and Mohamed Alomar) sent a delegation to France demanding independence. The delegation was headed by Hashim Atassi and included Saadallah al-Jabiri, Faris al-Khoury, Jamil Mardam Bey, Ministers Odmon Humusi and Amir Naim Mustafa al-Shihabi with Antioch as General Secretary.

== Electoral history ==
=== Parliamentary elections ===
Election	Seats	+/–	Position
1947	24 / 127	New	▲2nd
1949	13 / 113	▼11	▼3rd
1953	0 / 82	▼13	-
1954	19 / 142	▲19	▲3rd
1961	21 / 172	▲2	▲2nd

== Bibliography ==
- Moubayed, Sami M. (2013), Syria and the USA: Washington's Relations with Damascus from Wilson to Eisenhower, I.B.Tauris, ISBN 978-1-7807-6768-0
- Bidwell, Robin (2012), Dictionary Of Modern Arab History, Routledge, ISBN 978-0-7103-0505-3
- Tucker, Spencer C. (2010), The Encyclopedia of Middle East Wars: The United States in the Persian Gulf, Afghanistan, and Iraq Conflicts, I.B.Tauris, ISBN 978-1-8510-9947-4
- Moubayed, Sami M. (2006), Steel & Silk: Men and Women who Shaped Syria 1900-2000, Cune Press, ISBN 978-1-8859-4241-8
- Yaqub, Salim (2004), Containing Arab Nationalism: The Eisenhower Doctrine and the Middle East, UNC Press Books, ISBN 978-0-8078-5508-9
- Perry, Glenn E. (1997), The Middle East: Fourteen Islamic Centuries, Prentice Hall, ISBN 978-0-1326-6339-7
