= People's Party (Syria) =

People's Party حزب الشعب
- Founded: August 1948
- Dissolved: 1963
- Split from: National Bloc
- Headquarters: Aleppo
- Newspaper: Al-Shaʻb
- Ideology: Liberalism; National liberalism; Civic nationalism; Liberal conservatism; Conservative liberalism; Social liberalism; Arab nationalism; Pan-Arabism; Populism; Pro-Hashemite dynasty; Pro-Western Bloc; Faction: Syrian nationalism
- Political position: Centre-right

The People's Party (Arabic: حزب الشعب, romanized: Ḥizb aš-Šaʿb) was a Syrian political party that dominated Syrian politics during the 1950s and the early 1960s, until its dissolution following the 1963 Ba'athist coup.

The party was officially founded in August 1948 by Rushdi al-Kikhya, Nazim al-Qudsi and Mustafa Bey Barmada. It saw its greatest levels of support among Aleppo merchants, bankers and those in agriculture in surrounding areas. It supported closer ties with Hashemite-ruled Iraq and Jordan, although some members also supported closer ties with Lebanon. Similar to its rival, the National Party, it was also popular among landowners and landlords.

== History ==
=== Formation ===
In 1947, soon after Syrian independence, the National Bloc fractured due to internal conflicts among factions. One faction has members primarily originating from Homs, Hama and Aleppo and wanted closer economic ties with the Kingdom of Iraq, with this faction eventually became the People's Party. The party viewed Aleppo as a vital centre for economic development in Syria, perhaps to counter the influence of Damascus merchants. Besides the party's founders, Rushdi al-Kikhya, Nazim al-Qudsi and Mustafa Bey Barmada, the party also received support from the Atassi family in Homs, including Adnan al-Atassi and Hashim al-Atassi.

=== Legislative performance ===
The party performed well following the 1949 Syrian Constituent Assembly election where it secured a parliamentary majority. However, successive coups in December 1949 and 1951 placed Adib Shishakli briefly as Syrian leader. He was later removed in 1954 and the People's party restored its position as a major political party.

Between 1958 and 1961, the party briefly dissolved as Syria was a part of the United Arab Republic, with the party restored following the 1961 coup ending Syria's union with Egypt. In the 1961 parliamentary election held shortly afterwards, the People's party was elected as the largest party. The party held power until the 1963 Ba'athist coup, when the new NCRC banned all political parties outside of the Ba'ath party, meaning the People's party was forced to dissolve.

=== Potential revival ===
Prior to the fall of the Assad regime, there had been discussions about reviving the party in some form following the liberalization of requirements for membership in the National Progressive Front, but this was never materialized.

== Leaders ==
Leader	Tenure	Position(s)
Hashim al-Atassi	1949–51; 1954–55	President
Nazim al-Kudsi	1961–63	President
Fares al-Khoury	1944–45; 1954–55	Prime Minister
Maarouf al-Dawalibi	1961–62	Prime Minister
Rushdi al-Kikhya	1949–51	Speaker of parliament
Rashad Barmada	1954–62	Minister of Defense
Abd al-Wahhab Hawmad	1954–56	Minister of Finance

== Election results ==
Election	Seats	Status
1949	63 / 113	Majority
1954	30 / 142	Government
1961	33 / 172	Government

== Bibliography ==
- Lawson, Fred H. (2013), Global Security Watch—Syria, ABC-CLIO, ISBN 978-0-3133-5957-6
- Scott, Len; Hughes, R. Gerald (2013), Intelligence, Crises and Security: Prospects and Retrospects, Routledge, ISBN 978-0-4154-6430-7
- Schumann, Christoph (2010), Nationalism and Liberal Thought in the Arab East: Ideology and Practice, Routledge, ISBN 978-0-4155-5410-7
- Moubayed, Sami M. (2006), Steel & Silk: Men and Women who Shaped Syria 1900-2000, Cune Press, ISBN 978-1-8859-4241-8
- Chaurasia, Radhey S. (2005), History of Middle East, Atlantic Publishers & Dist, ISBN 978-8-1269-0448-8
- Commins, David Dean (2004), Historical dictionary of Syria, Scarecrow Press, ISBN 978-0-8108-4934-1
- Moubayed, Sami M. (2002), Damascus between democracy and dictatorship, University Press of America, ISBN 978-0-7618-1744-4
- Maddy-Weitzman, Bruce (1993), The Crystallization of the Arab State System, 1945-1954, Syracuse University Press, ISBN 978-0-8156-2580-3
- Ro'i, Yaacov (1974), From encroachment to involvement: a documentary study of Soviet policy in the Middle East, 1945-1973, Transaction Publishers, ISBN 978-0-470-73150-5
