= Yusuf al-Sa'dun =

Syrian rebel commander

- Born: 1888; Jisr al-Hadid, Ottoman Empire
- Died: 1980 (aged 91–92); Salqin, Syria
- Occupation: Rebel commander
- Known for: Commander of Antioch rebels during Hananu Revolt

Yusuf al-Sa'dun (Arabic: يوسف السعدون) (1888–1980) was a Syrian rebel commander in the Hananu Revolt based in the Jabal Qusayr area near Antioch in modern-day Turkey. His memoirs of the revolt is the only known rebel testimony available about the revolt that "does not slip into ideological discourse", according to historian Nadine Meouchy.

== Biography ==
=== Early life and career ===
Al-Sa'dun was born to a Sunni Muslim family in Jisr al-Hadid in the Sanjak of Alexandretta (modern-day Hatay Province) during Ottoman rule. Although he did not receive a military education, al-Sa'dun was known for his shooting skills and equestrianism. In 1914, during World War I, he volunteered to serve in the Ottoman Army's Hamidiye cavalry in Iraq against British forces.

=== Anti-French resistance ===
Al-Sa'dun returned to his homeland after the war and in 1919 formed a rebel band to counter the French occupation of northern Syria. His revolt became part of the wider Hananu Revolt and he was responsible for the Jabal Qusayr military zone, with his headquarters in Babatorun. The revolt largely petered out in the summer of 1921 with the flight of its overall leader Ibrahim Hananu. However, al-Sa'dun continued the armed struggle by first fleeing to Turkey, which he used as a base for raids against the French in Syria. He lived there in the city of Gaziantep with his family. In 1922, he launched a punitive expedition against Jabal Zawiya with the apparent target being defectors from the revolt, and later on 26 August, his rebel band, consisting of about 100 fighters, attacked a postal convoy traveling between Antioch and Darkush. He continued his guerrilla campaign against the French between December 1925 and August 1926, during the countrywide Great Syrian Revolt. The last major clashes with the French were at Tell 'Amar in April 1926 and in Jabal Qusayr in August 1926.

=== Later life ===
Al-Sa'dun opposed Turkish claims over the Sanjak of Alexandretta and sought to campaign for the region to remain part of Syria. He moved to Aleppo where he lived in hiding from the authorities in the 1930s. on his way to the Sanjak of Alexandretta, he was arrested by the French authorities. He was subsequently cleared of the charges against him, but he was placed under house arrest. His house arrest ended in 1940, and Syria gained its independence in 1946. In 1950, al-Sa'dun completed his memoirs of his experiences in the Hananu Revolt. Al-Sa'dun lived the remainder of his life in Salqin, a Syrian town near the Turkish border with the former Sanjak of Alexandretta. He died in 1980.

== Bibliography ==
- Arsuzi-Elamir, Dalal (2010). Peter Sluglett; Stefan Weber (eds.). Syria and Bilad Al-Sham Under Ottoman Rule: Essays in Honour of Abdul Karim Rafeq. Brill. p. 588. ISBN 9789004181939.
- Meouchy, Nadine (2010). "The Military and the Mujahidin in Action". In Leibau, Heike (ed.). The World in World Wars: Experiences, Perceptions and Perspectives from Africa and Asia. Brill. ISBN 9789004185456.
