= Adib Kheir =

Syrian politician

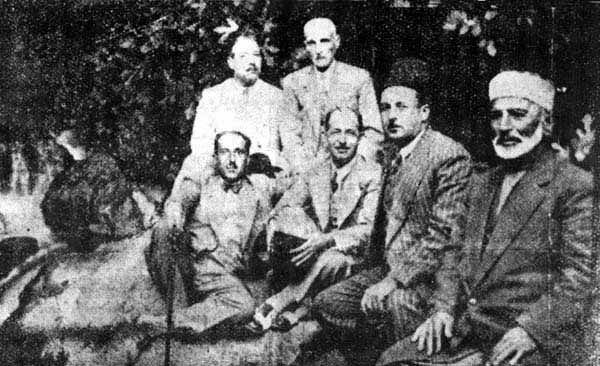
Seated from left to right: Shukri al-Quwatli (future president), Saadallah al-Jabiri (future prime minister), Rida al-Shurbaji (co-founder of the National Bloc), Sheikh Saleh al-Ali, commander of the Syrian Coastal Revolt of 1919. Standing are Hajj Adib Kheir (left) and Ibrahim Hananu, commander of the Aleppo Revolt

Adib Kheir (Arabic: أديب الخير) was a leading Syrian nationalist of the 1920s. He was the owner of the Librairie Universelle in Damascus. His granddaughter is the spouse of Manaf Tlass.
