= Demirköprü =

Demirköprü could refer to the following places in Turkey:

- Demirköprü, Antakya, a village in Hatay Province
- Demirköprü Dam, a dam in Manisa Province
- Demirköprü (bridge), a bridge in Adana
