= Husni al-Za'im government =

1949 Syrian government

- 39th government of the Syrian Republic

- Date formed: 16 April 1949
- Date dissolved: 26 June 1949

People and organisations
- President: Vacant (Note: Husni al-Za'im, as Commander-in-Chief of the Army and Armed Forces, was the de facto leader of Syria.)
- Prime Minister: Husni al-Za'im
- No. of ministers: 5

History
- Incoming formation: March 1949 coup d'état
- Legislature term: None
- Predecessor: K. al-Azm II
- Successor: M. al-Barazi

The Husni al-Za'im government was the thirty-ninth government in the history of modern Syria and the twenty-fourth administration of the First Syrian Republic. Formed on 17 April 1949 following the military coup led by Husni al-Za'im, it was the first government established after the overthrow of President Shukri al-Quwatli and the suspension of the existing constitutional order. Al-Za'im served simultaneously as Prime Minister and the dominant political authority in the country.

The government was formed amid a period of profound political uncertainty following Syria's defeat in the 1948 Arab–Israeli War and the subsequent military intervention in politics. Several major civilian political forces declined to participate in the cabinet, reflecting widespread skepticism toward the new regime. During its tenure, the government supervised the June 1949 Syrian presidential election, which resulted in the election of Husni al-Za'im as president of the republic. Following the completion of the electoral process, the cabinet resigned in accordance with the new political arrangements. Its term lasted slightly more than two months and marked the beginning of a period of recurring military intervention in Syrian politics.

== Composition ==
Portfolio	Minister	Took office	Left office	Party
Prime Minister	Husni al-Za'im	16 April 1949	26 June 1949	Independent
Minister of Interior	Husni al-Za'im	16 April 1949	26 June 1949	Independent
Minister of National Defense	Husni al-Za'im	16 April 1949	26 June 1949	Independent
Deputy Prime Minister	Adil Arslan	16 April 1949	26 June 1949	Independent
Minister of Foreign Affairs	Adil Arslan	16 April 1949	26 June 1949	Independent
Minister of Education	Faydi al-Atassi	16 April 1949	18 April 1949	Independent
Minister of Education	Khalil Mardam Bey	18 April 1949	26 June 1949	Independent
Minister of Health and Social Affairs	Faydi al-Atassi	16 April 1949	18 April 1949	Independent
Minister of Health and Social Affairs	Khalil Mardam Bey	18 April 1949	26 June 1949	Independent
Minister of Justice	Asaad al-Kurani	16 April 1949	26 June 1949	Independent
Minister of Public Works	Asaad al-Kurani	16 April 1949	19 April 1949	Independent
Minister of Public Works	Fathallah Saqqal	19 April 1949	26 June 1949	Independent
Minister of Finance	Hasan Jabbarah	16 December 1948	26 June 1949	Independent
Minister of Agriculture	Nuri al-Ibish	16 April 1949	26 June 1949	Independent
Minister of National Economy	Fathallah Saqqal	16 April 1949	19 April 1949	Independent
Minister of National Economy	Hasan Jabbarah	19 April 1949	26 June 1949	Independent

== See also ==
- Council of Ministers (Syria)
- List of Syrian governments
- Government ministries of Syria
- List of prime ministers of Syria
