= Umar al-Bitar =

Syrian military personnel (1886–1946)

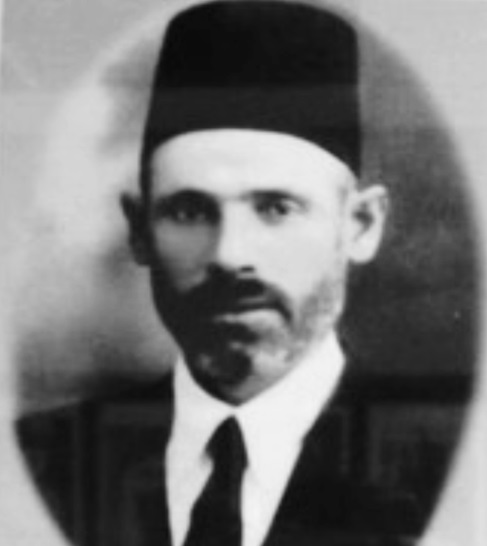
- Portrait of al-Bitar
- Born: 1886; Latakia Sanjak, Ottoman Empire
- Died: 1946 (aged 59–60); Turkey
- Occupation: Rebel commander
- Known for: Commander of Jabal Sahyun rebels during Hananu Revolt

Umar al-Bitar (Arabic: عمر البيطار) (1886–1946) was a Syrian rebel leader who led a revolt against French military forces in his native Latakia region in 1920. After the suppression of his revolt, he evaded arrest by the French authorities by escaping to Turkey. He was pardoned and returned to Syria in 1936 and entered politics as part of the anti-French opposition. The French authorities again tried to arrest Bitar in 1945, but he managed to escape to Turkey, where he died the next year.

== Biography ==
Bitar was born in 1886 to a Sunni Muslim, Arab family of landowners in the Latakia region and was raised in the port city of Latakia. In 1919, French troops landed on the Syrian coast to assume control of the country as part of their Mandate.

=== Commander in the Hananu Revolt ===
Al-Bitar formed a band of armed volunteers in 1919 to resist French military forces who were landing on the Syrian coast. Al-Bitar eventually joined the Hananu Revolt and was assigned responsibility over Jabal Sahyun, a mountainous region whose center was al-Haffah. He also coordinated military action with Saleh al-Ali who was leading the Alawite Revolt against the French in the mountains south of Jabal Sahyun. With material support from the Turkish armed movement fighting the French in southern Anatolia, Bitar acquired arms and military equipment. Within six months, his band grew from 100 members to 2,000, according to Syrian historian Sami Moubayed.

The French declared their mandate over Syria in 1920 and issued an arrest warrant for al-Bitar on charges that he killed French officers and engaged in rebellion against French authority. Al-Bitar consequently fled to Turkey, while the French military authorities sentenced him to death in absentia. Al-Bitar's rebels mostly joined the rebel band of Izz ad-Din al-Qassam, also based in Jabal Sahyun. Al-Bitar remained in Turkey under Mustafa Kemal Atatürk's protection for 16 years.

=== Political career ===
Al-Bitar returned to Syria in 1936 following nationalist Hashim al-Atassi's election to the presidency. Al-Atassi welcomed al-Bitar at the presidential palace in Damascus and praised him as a national hero. Upon his return, al-Bitar joined the National Bloc, the largest political party in Syria opposed to French rule. He based himself in Latakia. A year later, in 1937, al-Bitar was accused by the authorities of instigating violence against the French, who arrested him. He was imprisoned in the Citadel of Damascus. He was released in 1939, largely as a result of pressure Syrian nationalist politicians, but kept out of politics after his release. In 1943, he reentered politics as a candidate in the parliamentary elections. He evaded arrest by the French authorities in late May 1945 during a campaign against nationalist figures in Damascus. Al-Bitar left Damascus for Turkey, where he stayed until his death in 1946, the same year Syria became independent of France.

== Bibliography ==
- Moubayed, Sami (2006). Steel and Silk. Cune Press. ISBN 1885942419.
- Schleifer, Abdullah (2006). "Izz ad-Din al-Qassam: Preacher and Mujahid". In Burke, Edmund; Yaghoubian, Nejde (eds.). Struggle and Survival in the Modern Middle East. University of California Press. ISBN 9780520246614.
- Philipp, Thomas; Schumann, Christoph (2004). From the Syrian Land to the States of Syria and Lebanon. Ergon in Kommission. ISBN 9783899133530.
