= Alawite State =

French Mandate state in Syria, 1920–1936

Coordinates: 35.524212°N 35.782646°E

Territory of the Alawites (1920–1922) Territoire des Alaouites Alawite State (1922–1936) État des Alaouites دولة العلويين
- 1920–1936
- Flag

- The Alawite State (purple) in the Mandate of Latakia
- Status: 1920–1922; Territory administered according to the Mandate for Syria and Lebanon; 1922–1924; State of the Syrian Federation (administered according to the Mandate for Syria and Lebanon); 1925–1936; State administered according to the Mandate for Syria and Lebanon
- Common languages: French; Arabic
- Religion: Shia Islam (Alawism, Ismailism), Sunni Islam, Christianity
- Historical era: Interwar period
  - French occupation: 1918
  - Established: 2 September 1920
  - State declared: 1923
  - Named "Government of Latakia": 1930
  - Disestablished: 3 December 1936
Preceded by	Succeeded by
1920: OETA; 1924: Syrian Federation	1922: Syrian Federation; 1936: Syrian Republic
- Today part of: Syria

The Alawite State (Arabic: دولة جبل العلويين, Dawlat Jabal al-‘Alawiyyīn; French: État des Alaouites), initially named the Territory of the Alawites (French: territoire des Alaouites)—after the locally-dominant Alawites—from its inception until its integration to the Syrian Federation in 1922, was a French mandate territory on the coast of present-day Syria after World War I. The French Mandate from the League of Nations lasted from 1920 to 1946.

The use of "Alawite", instead of "Nusayri", was advocated by the French early in the Mandate period and referred to a member of the Alawite faith with the term literally referring to a "follower of Ali". In 1920, the French-named "Alawite Territory" was home to a large population of Alawites.

== Geography ==
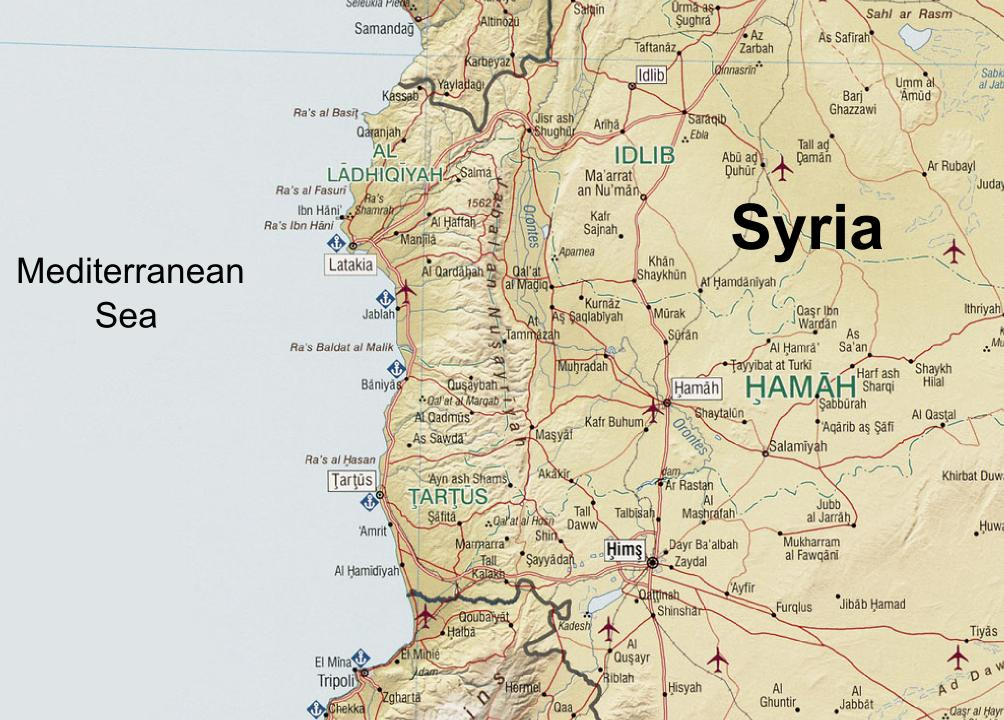
Physical-political map of the Alawite region

The region is coastal and mountainous, home to a predominantly-rural, heterogeneous population. During the French Mandate period, the society was divided by religion and geography; the landowning families and 80 percent of the population of the port city of Latakia were Sunni Muslim. More than 90 percent of the province's population was rural, and 82 percent were Alawites.

The Alawite State bordered Greater Lebanon on the south; the northern border was with the Sanjak of Alexandretta, where Alawites made up a large portion of the population. To the west was the Eastern Mediterranean. The eastern border with Syria ran roughly along the An-Nusayriyah Mountains and the Orontes River from north to south. The modern Latakia and Tartus Governorates roughly encompass the Alawite State. Both have majority Alawite populations; parts of modern-day Al-Suqaylabiyah, Masyaf, Talkalakh and Jisr ash-Shugur Districts also belonged to the state.

== History ==
=== 1918–1920 ===
The defeat and collapse of the Ottoman Empire at the end of World War I, with the Armistice of Mudros signed on 30 October 1918, brought on a scramble for control of the disintegrating empire's provinces. As of 1918, France occupied Lebanon and Syria, which was under the leadership of the Emir Faisal I. By 1920, a growing anti-French sentiment in the region led to the establishment of the Arab Kingdom of Syria under King Faisal I on 7 March 1920. The Arab Kingdom of Syria was initially supported by the British, despite French protests. The British withdrew support, and on 5 May 1920 the Allied Supreme Council published a Mandate for "Syria and the Lebanon" to the French Republic, with French and Arabic as the official languages. General Gouraud was appointed high commissioner of the Syrian territories and commander-in-chief of French forces.

The population of Lebanon was pro-French; that of Syria was anti-French, with a pan-Arab nationalistic bent. The French insisted that the Mandate was not "inconsistent" with Syrian self-government; Syrians were forced to accept the mandate when King Faisal left the country (under pressure from France) in July 1920, after Great Britain withdrew support for his rule in the face of French claims.

=== 1920–22 ===
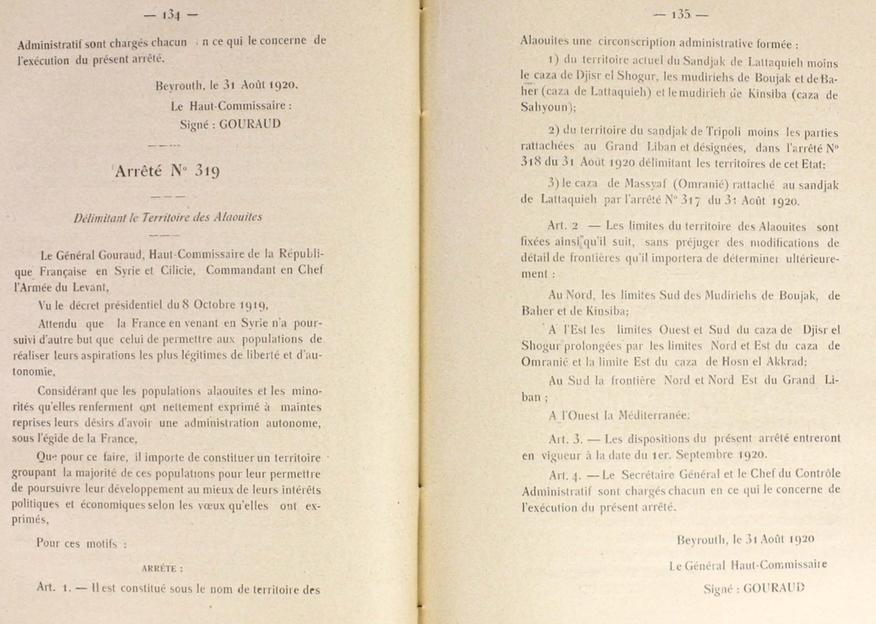
Arrêté No 319 by general Gouraud created the Alawite State, "Délimitant le Territoire des Alaouites" (Delineating the territory of the Alawites), 31 August 1920

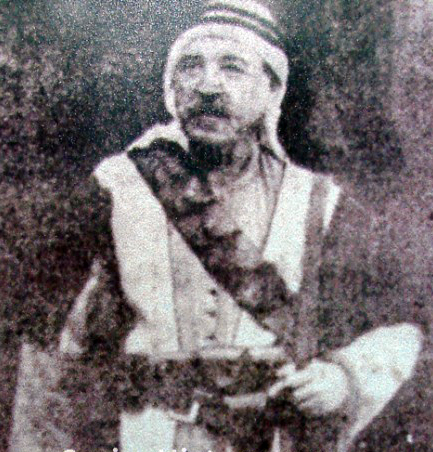
Saleh al-Ali, leader of the Alawite revolt against French rule

At the time, the French rejected native outcry for the unification of Syria. In early September 1920, the French divided the territories of their mandate based on heterogeneous population to grant local autonomy to demographic regions. Some argue that the French acted to intentionally divide the population, limiting the spread of "the urban contagion of nationalist agitation".

On 2 September 1920 a "Territory of the Alawis" was created in the coastal and mountain country, comprising Alawi villages; the French justified this separation by citing the "backwardness" of the mountain-dwellers, religiously distinct from the surrounding Sunni population. The division intended to protect the Alawi people from more-powerful majorities.

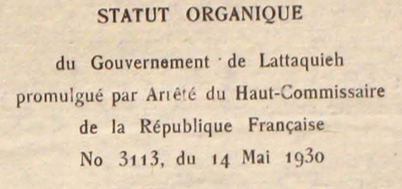
Statut Organique of the Alawite State, 14 May 1930

The Alawite State was run by a succession of French governors from 1920 to 1936:

- Colonel Marie Joseph Émile Niéger (1874-1951), 2 September 1920 – 1921
- Gaston Henri Gustave Billotte (1875-1940), 1921 – 1922
- Léon Henri Charles Cayla (1881-1965), 1922 – 1925
- Ernest Marie Hubert Schoeffler (1877-1952), 1925 – 5 December 1936

After the relative independence of Faisal I's rule, French colonialism was unwelcome. The divisions were thought to serve the interests of a Christian minority over a Muslim majority, favouring colonial rule and stifling dissent. The Sunni landowners, primarily living in the province's cities, were supporters of Syrian unity; however, the French were supported by the rural Alawite communities to whom they catered.

Salih al-Ali led the Syrian Revolt of 1919 in the Alawi region east of the coastal city of Latakia. Al-Ali was primarily interested in protecting Alawite regions from external meddling. His rebellions were not motivated by nationalist movement; however, they identified with it to further Alawite autonomy. The rebels surrendered to French forces after two years of raiding French outposts in October 1921.

=== 1923–1924 ===
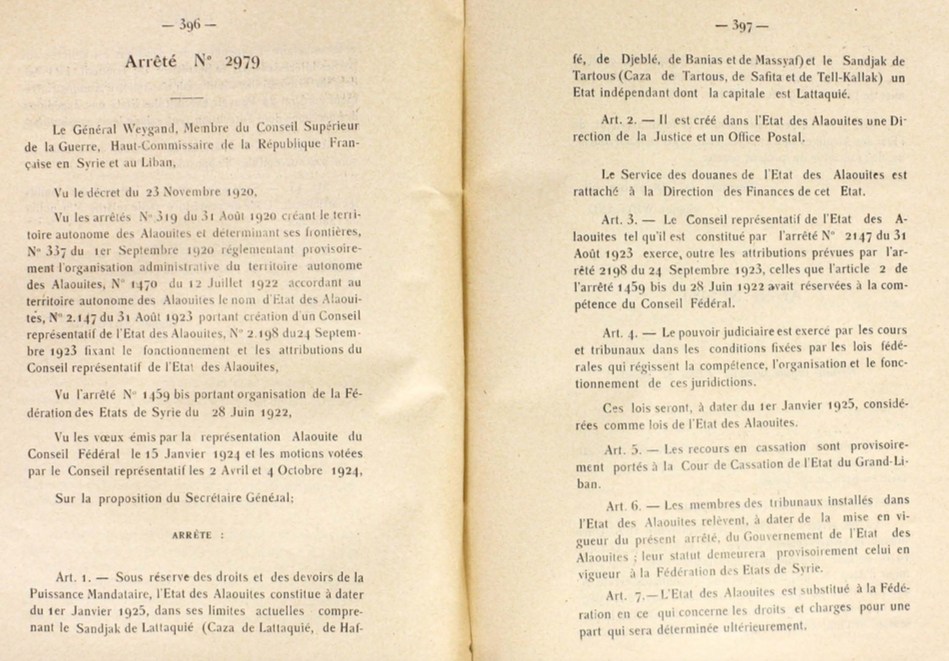
Arrêté 2979 by general Maxime Weygand established the Alawite State as an independent state by 1 January 1925, 5 December 1924

In 1922, the French administration instituted an elected government made up of councils of representative of the states of Aleppo, Damascus and the Alawite territory. In June 1923 the French administration, headed by General Maxime Weygand, allowed individual states to elect their own representative councils. The primary election, a contest between French officials and the nationalists, was considered fraudulent by Syrians (many of whom boycotted the 26 October elections). The Alawite State, insulated from nationalist tendencies, elected 10 pro-French representatives to its 12-person council after a 77-percent voter turnout in the primary elections. Such numbers were not seen in the nationalist Damascus and Aleppo. The Alawi preferred to be grouped with the territories of Lebanon, in contrast to Sunnis and Christians populations demanding Syrian unity. The majority of French support in these first elections came from rural populations, whom the French had primarily benefited.

=== 1925–27: Great Syrian Revolt ===
On 1 January 1925, the State of Syria was born from a French merger of the States of Damascus and Aleppo. Lebanon and the Alawi State were not included.

Perhaps inspired by the Turkish War of Independence (1919–1921), the Great Syrian Revolt began in the countryside of Jabal al-Druze. Led by Sultan al-Atrash as a Druze uprising, the movement was adopted by a group of Syrian nationalists led by Abd al-Rahman Shahbandar and spread to the states of Aleppo and Damascus. Lasting from July 1925 to June 1927, it was an anti-French, anti-imperialist response to five years of French rule; to the Druze it was not a movement toward Syrian unity, but simply a protest against French rule.

The rural Alawite territory was largely uninvolved in the Great Revolt. The French had favoured religious minorities such as the Druze and the Alawi, attempting to isolate them from mainstream nationalist culture. Many young men from rural Alawi communities joined the French troops, enlisting in the troupes speciales (part of the French forces in Syria at the time) for social advancement. These troops, regional forces recruited from minority populations, were often used to suppress civil disorders.

Itamar Rabinovich proposed three reasons why the Alawi people were uninterested in the Great Revolt:

1. Alawi predominance in the Alawi state was not absolute: In contrast to the Christian and Bedouin minorities of the Druze region, the Alawite territory was home to sizable Sunni and Christian groups (most of whom lived in the capital, Latakia). Many Sunni landlords oversaw Alawi sharecroppers. The economic dominance of the Sunni minority over the Alawi majority was a source of long-standing resentment. The Alawi were hardly enthusiastic over the nationalist sentiments of their Sunni landlords.
2. Alawi society was divided. The Alawi peasant was individualistic and his allegiance was claimed by distinct spiritual and tribal leaders and often by a landlord as well.
3. Its isolation, poverty, and social structure inflicted backwardness on the Alawi area. This coexisted with a strong feeling of solidarity with an attachment to the community and a sense of exclusiveness and mission.

In 1930 the Alawite State was renamed as the Government of Latakia, the only concession by the French to Arab nationalists until 1936.

=== Dissolution ===
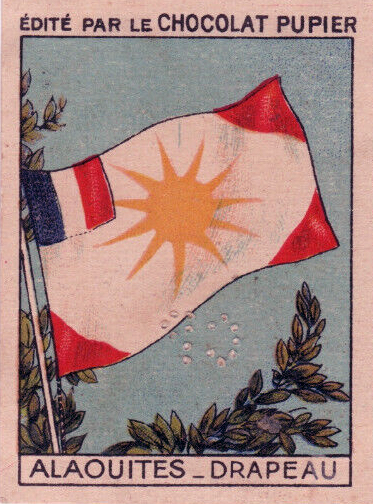
Flag on a French collector's card from around 1936

On 3 December 1936 (becoming effective in 1937), the Alawite state was incorporated into Syrian Republic as a concession by the French to the Nationalist Bloc (the ruling party of the semi-autonomous Syrian government).

There was a great deal of Alawite separatist sentiment in the region, but their political views could not be coordinated into a unified voice. This was attributed to the peasant status of most Alawites, "exploited by a predominantly Sunni landowning class resident in Latakia and Hama". There was also a great deal of factionalism amongst the Alawite tribes, and the Alawite State was incorporated into Syria with little organised resistance.

== Aftermath ==
=== 1936–1946 ===
By 1939 the Nationalist Bloc party fell out of favour with the Syrian people because of its failure to increase the autonomy of the Syrian government from French influence. Prime Minister Jamil Mardam resigned at the end of 1938; the French filled the power vacuum, dissolving Parliament, suppressing Syrian nationalism and increasing the autonomy of the French-supporting Alawite and Druze territories (thwarting Syrian unification).

World War II established a strong British presence in Syria. After the fall of the Third Republic in June 1940 and the French surrender to the Axis powers, Vichy France controlled Syria until Britain and Free France seized the country (and Lebanon) in July 1941. In 1942, the Latakia and Druze regions were returned to Syrian control. By the end of the war, Arab nationalists in Syria were ready to make another play for power.

=== 1946–63 ===
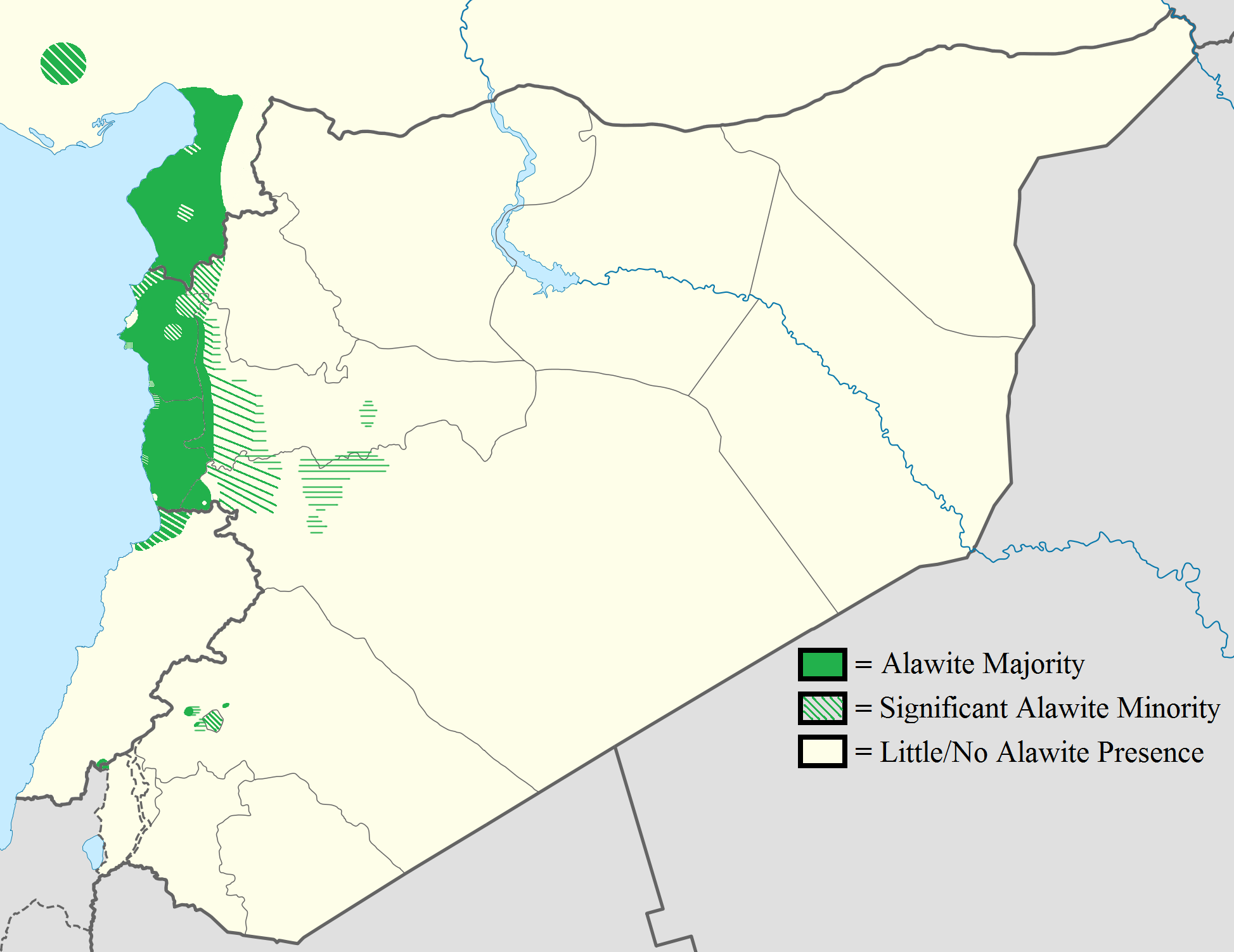
Distribution of Alawites in the Levant

The French left Syria in 1946 and the new, independent government lasted for three years (until a 1949 military coup). The Syrian army was dominated by recruits from Alawite, Druze and rural Kurdish Sunni communities, a holdover from the French Mandate Levant Army (which became the Syrian army after independence). Beginning after the 1949 coup, Alawites dominated the officer and governmental corps during the 1960s. Former presidents Hafez al-Assad and his son, Bashar, are of Alawite descent.

=== 2011–2024 ===
As a result of the Syrian civil war, in 2012 there was speculation of the possibility of reprisals against the Alawites leading to the re-creation of the Alawite State as a haven for Bashar al-Assad and government leaders if Damascus fell. King Abdullah II of Jordan called it the "worst-case" scenario in the conflict, fearing a domino effect: fragmentation of the country along sectarian lines, with region-wide consequences.

The December 2024 Syrian rebel offensives and the subsequent fall of the Assad regime sparked renewed speculation by some analysts about a potential revival of an Alawite state with Russian backing. For a brief period following the rebel takeover of Damascus, Latakia Governorate and Tartous Governorate (the historical territory of the Alawite State), were the only parts of Syria not under rebel control. Some Alawite villages there formed self-defense committees and set up checkpoints, but no expected Assadist national redoubt in the region came to fruition, probably because of the mixed attitudes of the Alawite population towards the HTS-led rebels. More importantly, the insurgency in Western Syria led by Alawite remnants of the Assad regime that killed 14 officers later that month can pose many challenges to the new government; which would subsequently have led to the mass killings of the Alawites as part of the crackdown on the remnants of the former regime.

== Population ==
Lattakia census, 1921–22
Religion	Inhabitants	Percentage
Alawites	253,000	70.7%
Sunni	50,000	14%
Christians	42,000	11.7%
Ismailis	13,000	3.6%
Total	358,000	100%

1923 Alawite census
	Alawi	Sunni	Isma'ilis	Christian
Population	173,000	32,000	5,000	36,000

1943 Latakia population
	Latakia (capital)	Urban	Rural
Population	36,687	41,687	610,820

== Postage stamps ==
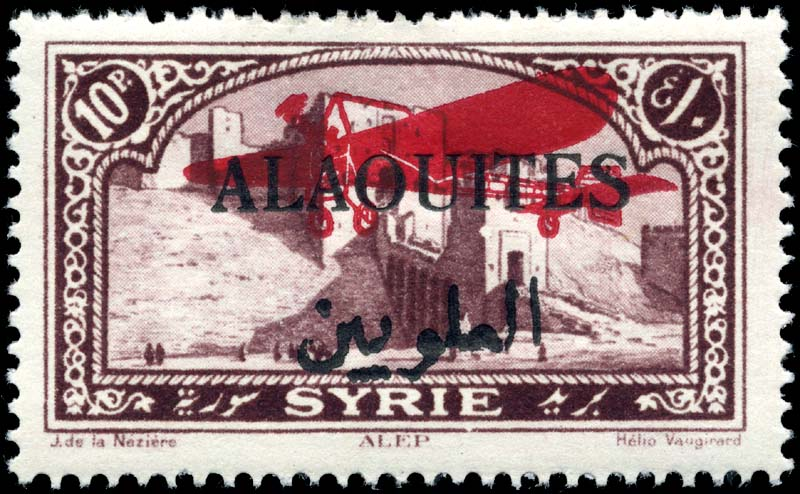
A double overprint: "Alaouites" over an aeroplane (indicating airmail) on 10-piastre Syrian stamp

== See also ==
- Jabal al-Druze State
