= Jamil Ibrahim Pasha =

Syrian politician

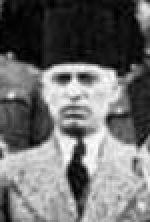
Jamil Ibrahim Pasha, 1939

Jamil Ibrahim Pasha (Arabic: جميل إبراهيم باشا) was a Syrian politician during French Mandatory rule. He among the leading dignitaries of Aleppo and during the Hananu Revolt against the French occupation of northern Syria, he was one of principal intermediaries between the Syrian rebels and the Turkish forces of Mustafa Kemal.

== Biography ==
Jamil Ibrahim Pasha was a Sunni Muslim and was described as an "Arabized Kurd" by historian Philip Khoury. A native of Aleppo, he enrolled in the Ottoman Military College in Istanbul and joined the reformist Committee of Union and Progress (CUP), which took power in the Ottoman state in 1908 during the Young Turk Revolution. Ibrahim Pasha served in the Ottoman Army during the Balkan Wars, a series of conflicts between the Ottomans and nationalist forces in their empire's Balkan territories between 1912 and 1913. During World War I and the 1916 Arab Revolt against the Ottomans, Ibrahim Pasha advocated for preserving the unity of the Ottoman Empire. However, following the Ottomans' fall, he became allied with the Arab nationalist forces in Syria.

France gained full control of Syria in 1920 after defeating the Arab government of King Faisal I in July 1920. During this time, rebel guerrilla groups and political activists and dignitaries opposed to French rule launched a revolt against the French, known as the Hananu Revolt after its main political leader, Ibrahim Hananu. Faisal's Arab government had been the main financial backer of the revolt, but after its fall, Hananu and the rebels turned to Turkish guerrillas also fighting the French in southwestern Anatolia, which borders the Aleppo region. Jamil Ibrahim Pasha became a main liaison between the Syrian rebels and the Turkish guerrillas, who were led by Mustafa Kemal. Jamil Ibrahim Pasha met with Mustafa Kemal in the late summer of 1920 to finalize plans for a Turkish-Syrian military campaign against French forces. The Hananu revolt dissipated by the summer of 1921.

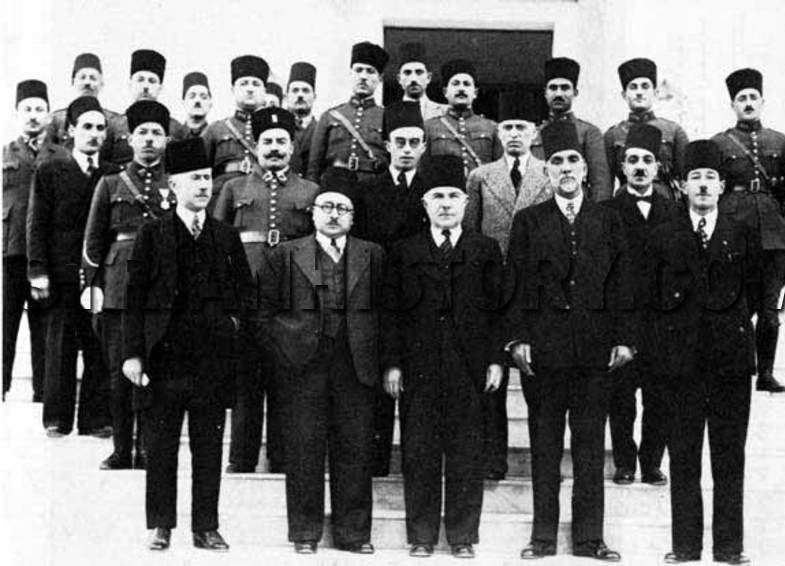
A delegation of National Bloc politicians at the Syrian government's Damascus headquarters, 1939. Jamil Ibrahim Pasha is the first from the left in the second row

Following the revolt's collapse, Ibrahim Pasha maintained strong links to Aleppo's population. Of all of Aleppo's political leaders, Ibrahim Pasha had the closest ties to the inhabitants of Aleppo's nationalist-dominated quarters. At his advice, high school students throughout the city posted themselves at voting booths to encourage would-be voters to boycott the parliamentary elections of 1925, which coincided with the outbreak of the Great Syrian Revolt (1925–1927) against the French that was started by the Druze leader Sultan al-Atrash in the southern Sweida region. The effort was a major success, with 23% of registered voters participating in the polls versus 40% in the 1923 elections. Ibrahim Pasha and 42 other Aleppine boycott leaders were subsequently arrested by the French authorities. In 1928, Ibrahim Pasha and many of the other pro-revolt leadership of Syria were amnestied by the French and in March Ibrahim Pasha joined the National Bloc. The latter was a political opposition movement that called for Syria's independence. Ibrahim Pasha became one of the leaders of the movement from Aleppo, and was a member of the National Bloc Council, the movement's 38-member executive body.

== Bibliography ==
- Khoury, Philip S. (1987). Syria and the French Mandate: The Politics of Arab Nationalism, 1920–1945. Princeton University Press. ISBN 9781400858392.
