= Abu Talha, Syria =

Abu Talha ابو طلحة
- Village
- Location within Syria
- Coordinates: 36°6′14″N 36°26′1″E
- Country: Syria
- Governorate: Idlib
- District: Harem
- Subdistrict: Salqin

Population (2004 census)
  - Total: 1,087
- Time zone: UTC+2 (EET)
  - Summer (DST): UTC+3 (EEST)

Abu Talha (Arabic: ابو طلحة, romanized: Abū Ṭalḥa; also spelled Abou Talha) is a village in northwestern Syria, administratively part of the Idlib Governorate, located northwest of Idlib near the border with Turkey. Nearby localities include Azmarin to the south, Armanaz to the east, Salqin to the north and Dalbiyah to the northwest. According to the Syria Central Bureau of Statistics, Abu Talha had a population of 1,087 in the 2004 census.
