= Talamar =

Talamar تلعمار Tell 'Amar
- Village
- Location in Syria
- Coordinates: 36°3′30″N 36°25′2″E
- Country: Syria
- Governorate: Idlib Governorate
- District: Harem District
- Subdistrict: Salqin

Population (2004)
  - Total: 1,619
- Time zone: UTC+2 (EET)
  - Summer (DST): UTC+3 (EEST)

Talamar (Arabic: تلعمار, also spelled Tell 'Amar) is a village in northern Syria, administratively part of the Idlib Governorate, located northwest of Idlib and just east the Syrian–Turkish border. Nearby localities include Azmarin to the west, Darkush to the south, the subdistrict center Salqin to the north and Armanaz to the east. According to the Syria Central Bureau of Statistics, Talamar had a population of 1,619 in the 2004 census.
