= Al-Alani =

Al-Alani العلاني
- Village
- Location within Syria
- Coordinates: 36°9′33″N 36°23′22″E
- Country: Syria
- Governorate: Idlib
- District: Harem
- Subdistrict: Salqin

Population (2004 census)
  - Total: 3,279
- Time zone: UTC+2 (EET)
  - Summer (DST): UTC+3 (EEST)

Al-Alani (Arabic: العلاني, romanized: al-ʿAlānī, also spelled al-Alini or al-Lani) is a town in northwestern Syria, administratively part of the Idlib Governorate, just east of the Syria–Turkey border. Nearby localities include Salqin and Isqat to the east. According to the Syria Central Bureau of Statistics, al-Alani had a population of 3,279 in the 2004 census.
