= Dima Aktaa =

Syrian parathlete

Personal information
- Native name: ديما الأكتع
- Nationality: Syrian
- Citizenship: British
- Born: 1994 (age 31–32) Salqin, Syria
- Occupation: Runner

Sport
- Sport: Athletics
- Disability: Leg amputee

Dima Aktaa (Arabic: ديما الأكتع; born 1994) is a Syrian athlete and fundraiser, who was named one the BBC's 100 Women list in 2022. As of 2022 Aktaa was in training to compete in the 100m at the 2024 Summer Paralympics.

== Biography ==
Aktaa was born in 1994 in Syria. In August 2012 her home in Salqin, near Idlib, was bombed and the subsequent explosion caused a traumatic amputation of her leg. The family left Syria for Lebanon, where they lived for a number of years, before coming to the United Kingdom as refugees in 2017. She and her family were staying in Manchester until they were settled in Bedfordshire in 2018. After receiving asylum and receiving a prosthetic leg, Aktaa took up running again, a sport she had been passionate about prior to losing her leg.

During the COVID-19 pandemic she was part of a walking initiative that raised over £70,000 to support vaccination schemes in refugee camps. As of 2022 Aktaa was in training to compete in the 100m at the 2024 Summer Paralympics.

== Recognition ==
Aktaa's contributions to sport and disability awareness were recognised by her inclusion on the BBC's 100 Women list in 2022, one of eight Arab women included that year. In 2020 she was recognised as a member of 'The Lionhearts' - an alternative England football squad. The pop singer Anne-Marie wrote a song about her life.
