= Azmarin =

Azmarin عزمارين
- Village
- Location within Syria
- Coordinates: 36°3′21″N 36°24′3″E
- Country: Syria
- Governorate: Idlib
- District: Harem
- Subdistrict: Salqin

Population (2004 census)
  - Total: 3,720
- Time zone: UTC+2 (EET)
  - Summer (DST): UTC+3 (EEST)

Azmarin (Arabic: عزمارين; also spelled Ezmarin) is a village in northwestern Syria, administratively part of the Idlib Governorate, located northwest of Idlib on the border with Turkey. Nearby localities include Abu Talha to the north, Armanaz to the northeast, Maarrat Misrin to the east and Darkush to the south. According to the Syria Central Bureau of Statistics, Azmarin had a population of 3,720 in the 2004 census.
