= Khalil Mardam Bey =

Syrian poet, writer of the national anthem (1895–1959)

- خليل مردم بك
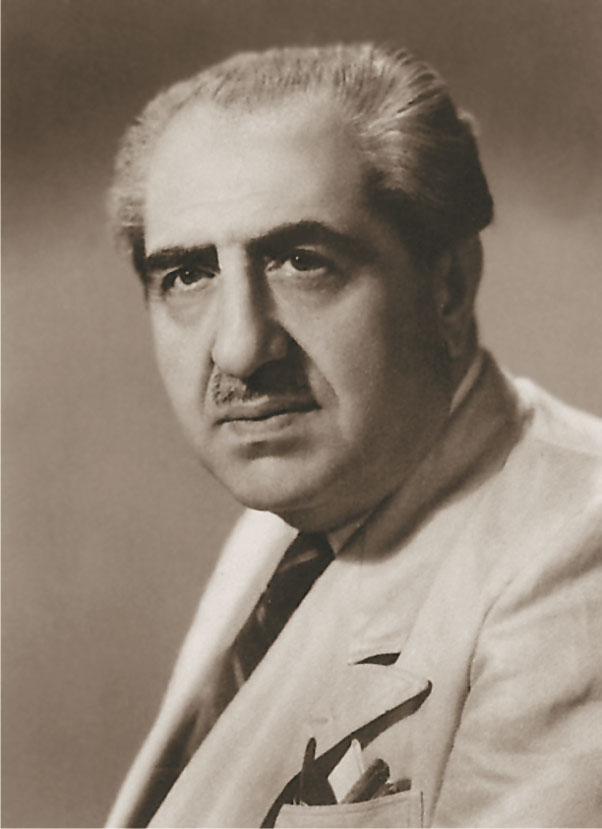
- Mardam Bey in 1938
- Born: July 1, 1895; Damascus, Ottoman Syria (present-day Syria)
- Died: July 21, 1959 (aged 64); Damascus, United Arab Republic
- Occupations: Poet, Scholar

Khalil Mardam Bey (Arabic: خليل مردم بك; 1895–1959) was a prominent Syrian poet, critic, and scholar. He is most widely recognized for composing the lyrics of the Syrian National Anthem, "Humat al-Diyar" (Guardians of the Homeland).

== Early life and education ==
Khalil Mardam Bey was born in Damascus to a prominent well-known family of Turkish origin. He was the only son of Ahmed Mukhtar Mardam Bey and Fatima Mahmoud Hamzaoui.

== Career ==
Mardam Bey's career in public service began in 1918 when he was appointed to the Diwan of General Correspondence. In 1920, during the brief reign of King Faisal I, he served as the Assistant Director of the Council of Ministers.

In 1921, he co-founded the Literature Association (al-Rabita al-Adabiya) and served as its administrative leader. The association published a literary magazine of the same name, which featured many of his early poems and studies, until it was closed by French Mandate authorities.

Upon his return from London in 1929, he lectured on Arabic literature at the National Science College.

Later in his career, Mardam Bey held several high-ranking government positions, including:

- Minister of Education (1942)
- Minister of Health (1949)
- Minister Plenipotentiary to Baghdad (1951)

He served as the Chairman of the Arab Academy of Damascus from 1953 until his death.

== Personal life ==
Mardam Bey was married and had five children: three daughters and two sons. His eldest son, Muhammad Adnan Mardam Bey (1917–1988), was a noted poet and lawyer.

He was a cousin of the Syrian statesman and nationalist leader Jamil Mardam Bey, who served as Prime Minister of Syria.

Mardam Bey died in Damascus on July 21, 1959. His funeral was held at the Umayyad Mosque, and he was interred in his family's plot near the Bab al-Saghir cemetery. In recognition of his contributions to Syrian literature and national identity, a street in Damascus was named in his honor.
