= Salih al-Ali =

Syrian Alawite military commander (1883–1950)

Salih al-Ali صالح العلي
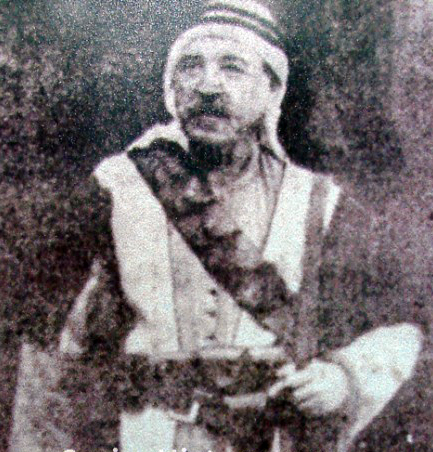
- Al-Ali during the rebellion of 1919
- Born: 1883; Al-Shaykh Badr, Syria vilayet, Ottoman Empire
- Died: 13 April 1950 (aged 65–66); Tartus, Syrian Republic
- Known for: Commander of the Syrian Revolt of 1919

Salih al-Ali (Note: Arabic: صالح العلي, romanized: Ṣāliḥ al-ʿAlī) (1883 – 13 April 1950) was a Syrian Alawite military commander who led the Alawite revolt of 1919–1921 against the French mandate of Syria.

== Background ==
Salih al-Ali was born in 1883 to a family of Alawite notables from al-Shaykh Badr, in the Syrian Coastal Mountain Range in northwest. He reportedly clashed with the Ottomans in 1918 before their withdrawal from Syria, killing two Ottoman soldiers who were harassing a wife of his father. This act gained him a local reputation as a rebel. After his father's death, he built a shrine for him and reportedly performed miracles at the site, according to local legend.

== Rebellion against the French ==
=== Organizing the rebellion ===
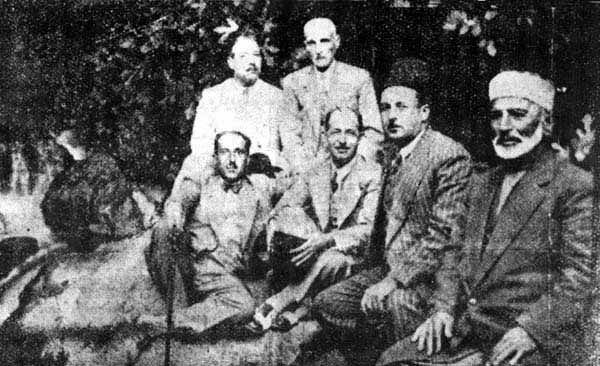
Seated from left to right: Shukri al-Quwatli (future president), Saadallah al-Jabiri (future prime minister), Rida al-Shurbaji (co-founder of the National Bloc), Sheikh Salih al-Ali, commander of the Syrian Coastal Revolt of 1919. Standing are Hajj Adib Kheir (left) and Ibrahim Hananu, commander of the Aleppo Revolt

=== Final stages ===
The balance of power began to shift in favor of the French after they conquered Damascus, defeating a makeshift army at the Battle of Maysalun on 24 July 1920. Around this time al-Ali began collaborating, through Ibrahim Hananu's meditation, with Turkish Kemalist forces fighting the French occupation in southern Anatolia. A letter addressed directly to Mustafa Kemal in January 1921 asking for weapons for their common "jihad" against the French is preserved in the Turkish ATASE military archives in Ankara.

=== Later years ===
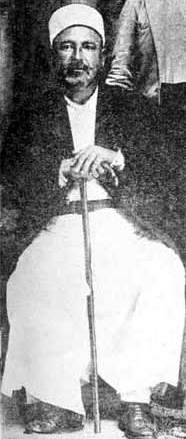
Salih al-Ali

Al-Ali remained in hiding until General Gouraud issued a general amnesty in 1922. He returned to his home and abstained from all political activity until his death on 13 April 1950 in Tartus.

== Legacy ==
Salih al-Ali became a celebrated figure after the Syria's independence. Al-Ali, in his first public appearance since 1922, was a guest of honor of president Shukri al-Quwatli at the Evacuation Day celebrations on 17 April 1946.

== Bibliography ==
- Moosa, Matti (1987). Extremist Shiites: The Ghulat Sects. Syracuse University Press. ISBN 0-8156-2411-5.
- Douwes, Dick (2011). "Modern History of the Nizari Ismailis of Syria". In Farhad Daftary (ed.). A Modern History of the Ismailis: Continuity and Change in a Muslim Community. I. B. Tauris. ISBN 9780857735263.
- Moubayed, Sami M. (2006). Steel & Silk: Men & Women Who Shaped Syria 1900–2000. Cune Press. ISBN 1-885942-41-9.
- Winter, Stefan (2016). A History of the 'Alawis: From Medieval Syria to the Turkish Republic. Princeton University Press. ISBN 9780691173894. Archived from the original on 28 November 2021.
