= Demirköprü (bridge) =

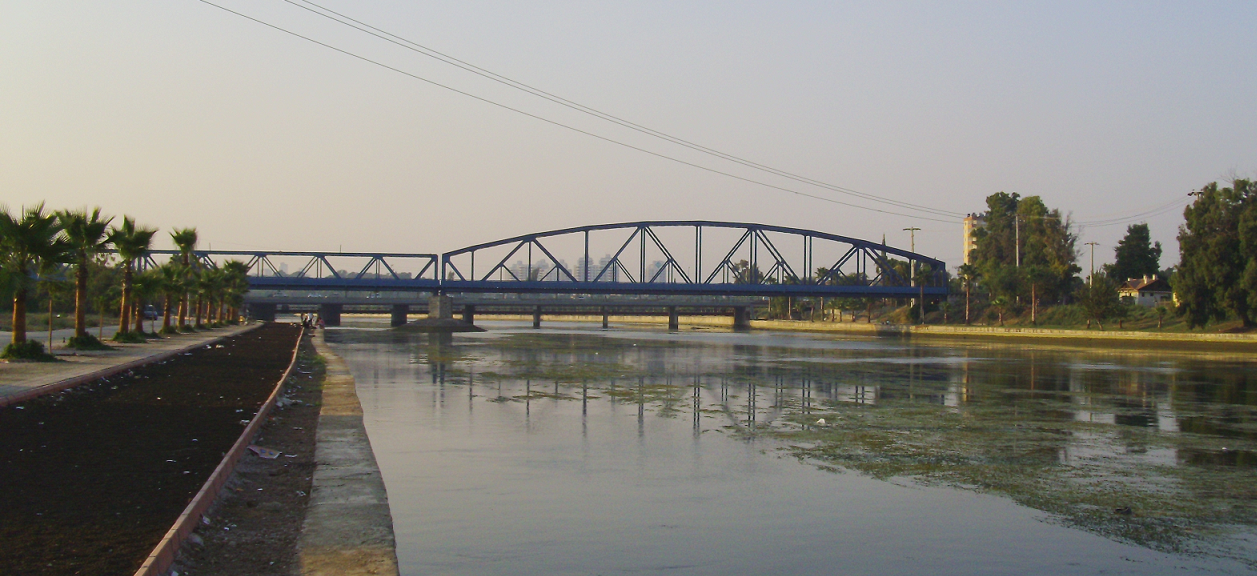
- Coordinates: 37.007358°N 35.335165°E
- Carries: Adana-Aleppo railway
- Crosses: Seyhan River
- Locale: Adana, Turkey
- Official name: Demirköprü

Characteristics
- Design: Steel Bridge
- Material: Steel
- Total length: 530 m

History
- Construction end: 1912

Demirköprü (literally iron bridge) is a railway bridge spanning the Seyhan River in Adana. Opened in 1912, it extends 530 meters between Reşatbey and Sinanpaşa neighborhoods. Demirköprü is a steel bridge constructed by German Engineers in part of the Berlin-Baghdad Railway project. It was last renovated in 2006.

== Gallery ==
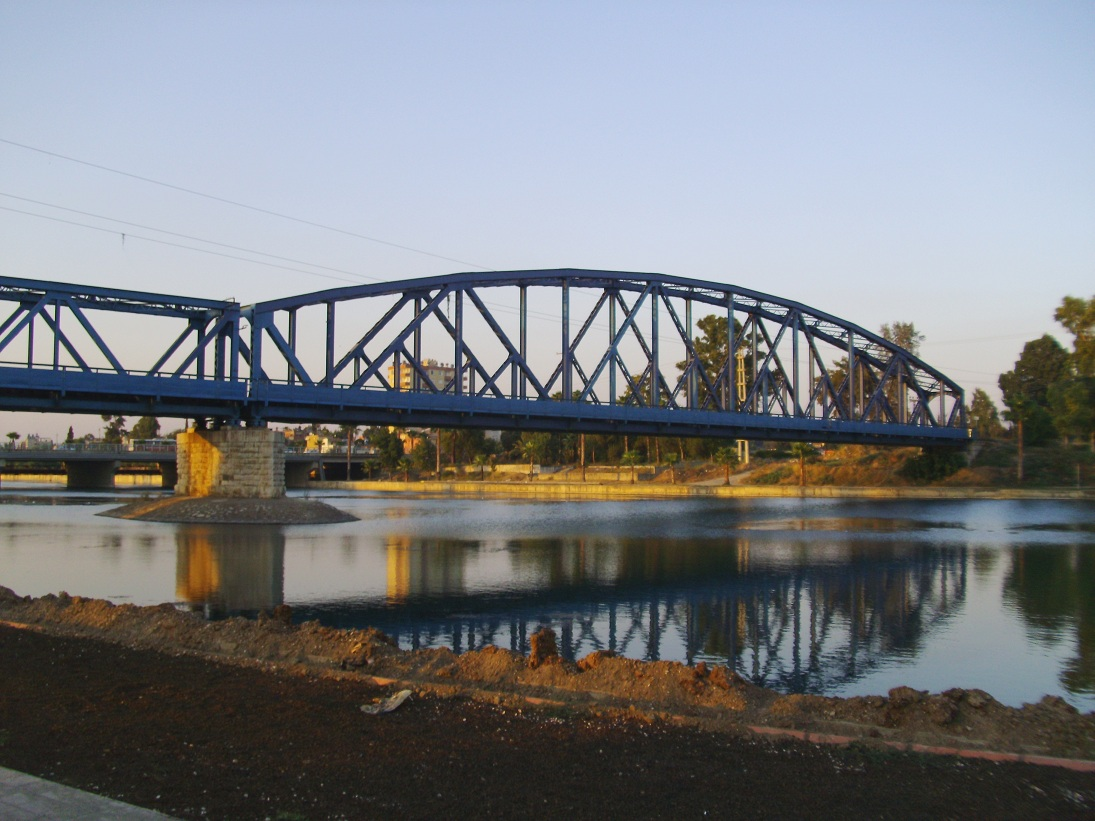
Demirköprü

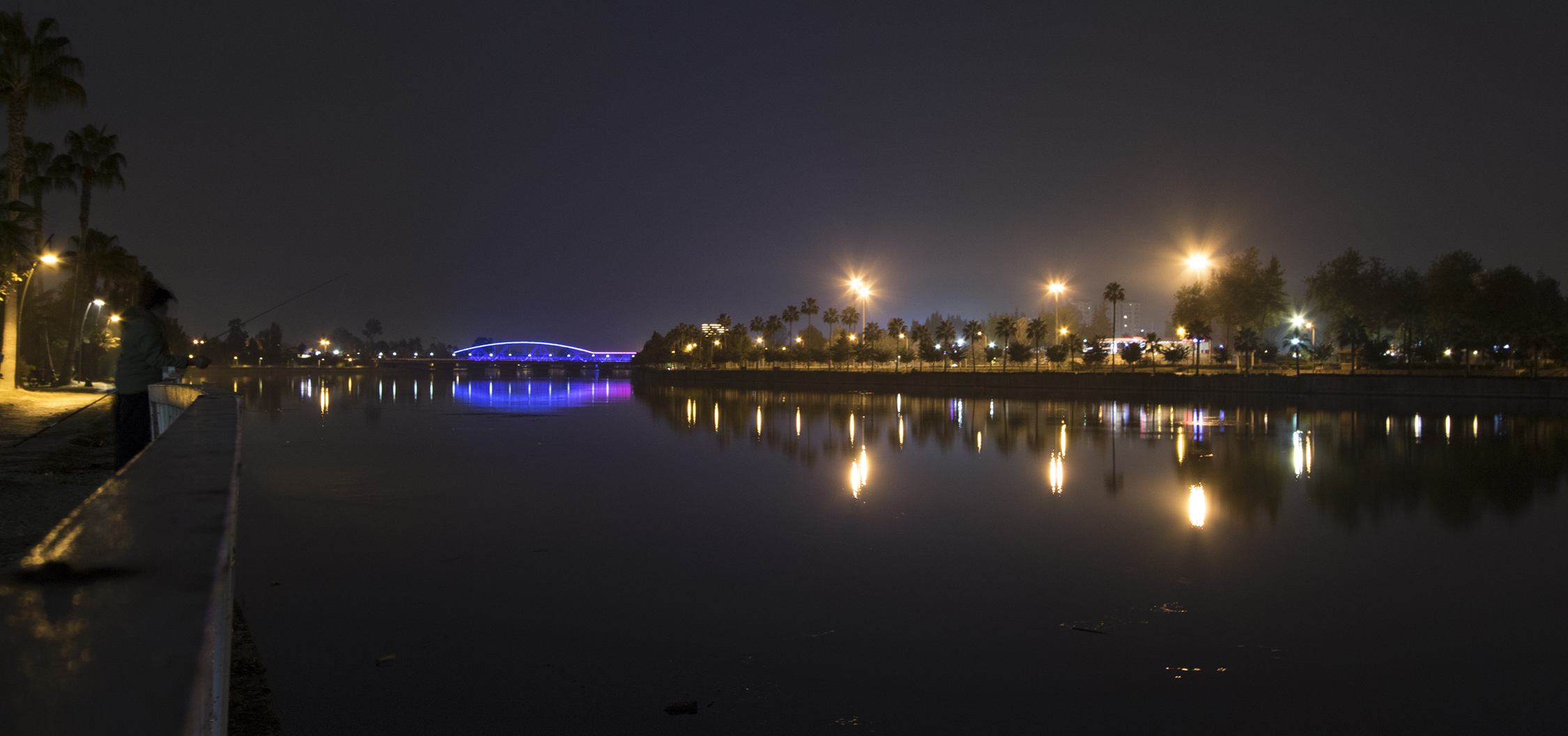
Demirköprü at night
