= Isqat =

Isqat اسقاط
- Village
- Location within Syria
- Coordinates: 36°9′8″N 36°28′29″E
- Country: Syria
- Governorate: Idlib
- District: Harem
- Subdistrict: Salqin

Population (2004)
  - Total: 4,535
- Time zone: UTC+2 (EET)
  - Summer (DST): UTC+3 (EEST)

Isqat (Arabic: اسقاط, romanized: Isqāṭ) is a village in northwestern Syria, administratively part of Idlib Governorate. Nearby localities include Salqin to the southwest, Kafr Takharim to the southeast, Harem to the northeast and al-Alani to the west. According to the Syria Central Bureau of Statistics (CBS), Isqat had a population of 4,535 in 2004.
