= Demirköprü, Antakya =

Demirköprü Jisr al-Hadid
- Neighbourhood
- Location in Turkey
- Coordinates: 36°14′54″N 36°21′11″E
- Country: Turkey
- Province: Hatay
- District: Antakya
- Population (2022): 1,011
- Time zone: UTC+3 (TRT)

Demirköprü (also known as Jisr al-Hadid) is a neighbourhood of the municipality and district of Antakya, Hatay Province, Turkey. Its population is 1,011 (2022). The village was the birthplace of Yusuf al-Sa'dun, a commander in the Hananu Revolt.

== History ==
Demirköprü is the location of the ancient settlement of Gephyra (= bridge in Greek), an important station for the transport of goods from the port of Seleucia Pieria to Antioch and further east to Euphrates. Around 20 miles north of Antioch, the bridge known as "Iron Bridge" due to its iron braces spanned the Orontes on nine arches. The bridge lasted until the twentieth century when it was pulled down.

Nearby is Tell Tayinat which is probably Kinalua, the capital of the Neo-Hittite kingdom of Pattin.
