= Fathallah Saqqal =

Syrian intellectual

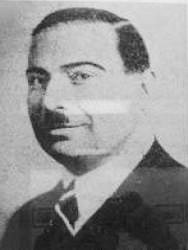
Saqqal, circa 1922

Fathallah Saqqal (Arabic: فتح الله الصقال; 1898 – 27 March 1970) was a Syrian attorney, writer and government minister. He was well known for successfully arguing for Ibrahim Hananu's innocence in the French Mandatory courts in Syria regarding Hananu's participation in the Hananu Revolt between 1919 and 1921.

== Biography ==
Saqqal was born in Aleppo in 1898 to father Michel Saqqal and mother Magida Baccache. The Saqqals were an Armenian Catholic family. Saqqal graduated from the French law school in Cairo, Egypt. Thereafter, he practiced law in the Mixed Courts of Egypt before returning to Aleppo in 1919 to open his own practice. During his first defense case, he argued his case in the elaborate manner he had grown accustomed to in Egypt, but which was frowned upon by the Ottoman court system and its Syrian successors, which preferred brief defense arguments (Syria had been part of the Ottoman Empire until 1918, after which it came under an informal Arab administration before French Mandatory rule began in 1920). Saqqal was told by the judge that if he were to continue in this manner, he ought to return to Cairo.

Between 1919 and 1921, a revolt against French rule had been active throughout Aleppo's western countryside and the political leader of the revolt was Ibrahim Hananu. Hananu evaded capture by the French military by escaping to Transjordan, but he was soon after extradited to the French authorities by British authorities in Transjordan. Saqqal defended Hananu during his four-day trial by the French Mandatory court in Aleppo between 15–18 March 1922. Saqqal produced for the court documents from Ankara, the capital of the Turkish state that succeeded the Ottoman Empire in Anatolia, that showed Hananu had been commanded by the Ottoman authorities to engage in war against the French in Syria. Saqqal also brought numerous Aleppine notables and religious figures to testify on Hanna's behalf, with their testimony generally painting a picture of Hananu as a patriot rather than a brigand rebel. Thus, Saqqal was able to persuade the court that Hananu had only been carrying out his military duties as an Ottoman soldier. The court acquitted Hananu on a three-two vote. His acquittal was widely celebrated in Aleppo and Syria.

Saqqal later served as Minister of National Economy in the cabinet of Prime Minister Husni az-Za'im, who had overthrown President Shukri al-Quwatli in April 1949. Za'im's government lasted until Za'im was killed in August 1949. Saqqal published Za'im's memoirs, Min Dhikrayat al-Za'im Husni al-Za'im (Recollections on Colonel Husni az-Za'im) in Cairo in 1951. Following Syria's secession from the United Arab Republic, Saqqal was one of the signatories of Syria's new National Charter.

He died on 27 March 1970 in his hometown, Aleppo.
