= Babatorun =

Babatorun Babtrun
- Neighbourhood
- Location within Turkey
- Coordinates: 36°4′57″N 36°17′56″E
- Country: Turkey
- Province: Hatay
- District: Altınözü
- Population (2022): 1,393
- Time zone: UTC+3 (TRT)
- Postal code: 31750
- Area code: 0326

Babatorun (known as Babtrun in Arabic) is a neighbourhood of the municipality and district of Altınözü, Hatay Province, Turkey. Its population is 1,393 (2022).

The neighbourhood is populated by Arabs
