= Alawite revolt of 1919 =

Anti-French rebellion in Ottoman Syria

Alawite revolt
- Part of the Franco-Syrian War
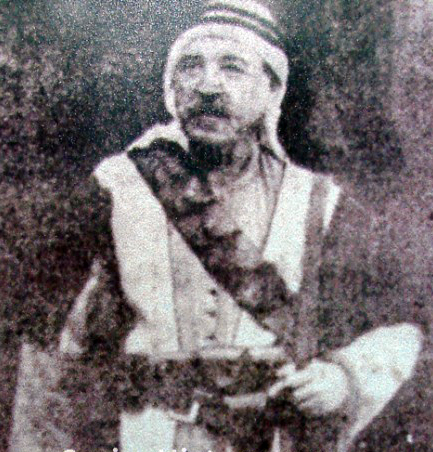
- Shaykh Saleh al-Ali, leader of the revolt
Date	June 1919 – July 1921
Location	Syrian Coastal Mountain Range (Jabal Ansariyah)
Result	French victory

Belligerents
(French Third Republic) France; Supported by: • Ismaili militiamen	Alawite rebels Supported by: • Arab Kingdom of Syria • Northern Syrian rebels

Commanders and leaders
(French Third Republic) Henri Gouraud	Saleh al-Ali

The Alawite revolt (also called the Shaykh Saleh al-Ali Revolt) was a rebellion, led by Shaykh Saleh al-Ali against the French authorities of the Occupied Enemy Territory Administration and later as part of the Franco-Syrian War against the newly established French Mandate of Syria, primarily in the coastal Jabal Ansariyah mountain range. The revolt was one of the first acts of armed resistance against the French forces in Syria, and its leader, Shaykh Saleh, declared his allegiance to the provisional Arab government in Damascus. He coordinated with the leaders of other anti-French revolts in the country, including the revolt of Ibrahim Hananu in the Aleppo countryside and Subhi Barakat's revolt in Antioch.

== Background ==
Following the withdrawal of Ottoman troops from the coastal city of Latakia in October 1918 as a result of the advance of Entente forces and the Arab Sharifian army into Syria, members of Latakia's Sunni Muslim elite established a provisional administration whose authority was, in effect, limited to the city. The Latakian administration declared its allegiance to the Hashemite leader of the Sharifian army, Emir Faisal, who established a provisional government based in Damascus. In the Jabal Ansariyah mountain range east of Latakia and the coastal cities, a chaotic state of affairs prevailed, with several Alawite militias controlling the region, which was predominantly inhabited by Alawite Muslims. In early November, a French military contingent landed in Latakia, dismissed the city's provisional government, assumed control over the city and laid claims to the rest of Syria.

The catalyst of the Alawite Revolt was an attempt by the French military authorities to arbitrate disputes between the Alawite and Ismaili leaders of the al-Qadmus area in Jabal Ansariyah. According to historian Dick Douwes, the conflict in al-Qadmus "cannot readily be attributed to class or sectarian factors" due to the "clannish nature of local politics" in the region. The conflict began when a new set of leaders in the vicinity of al-Qadmus emerged in the aftermath of the Ottoman withdrawal and challenged the traditional authority of the town's Ismaili emirs. The new leadership consisted of Ismailis, including the sons of some emirs, and local Alawites. Tensions between the two sides escalated when an Ismaili man killed the son of a leader of the Alawite Khayyatin tribe. The Khayyatin mobilized against the Ismaili emirs after they did not pay the traditional blood money to compensate for the killing. After a failed mediation attempt by Alawite sheikhs from Masyaf, the Khayyatin and allied Alawite clans launched an attack against the Ismailis of al-Qadmus in March 1919.

In May 1919, intensifying disputes regarding land and livestock between the Sunni Muslim and Ismaili residents of the fortress village of Khawabi, prompted the Sunni Muslims to invite Alawite clans to assault the Ismailis there. About 100 residents were killed in the ensuing fighting and thousands more Ismailis fled to the port city of Tartus. Alawite militias also launched raids against Greek Orthodox and Maronite-dominated villages in the Tartus area. French representatives, who Douwes described as "ill-informed" about politics in the area, attempted to negotiate with the Alawite chiefs involved in the conflict, including Shaykh Saleh al-Ali. Shaykh Saleh was a locally respected 35-year-old Alawite landowner and religious shaykh popularly known for his resistance to Ottoman intervention into the affairs of Jabal Ansariyah's inhabitants. French arbitration proved unsuccessful.

=== Prelude ===
Shaykh Saleh was determined to prevent foreign interference in the affairs of Jabal Ansariyah and saw the Arab government in Damascus as much less of a threat to his authority than the French. The attempted French intervention lent the conflict "anti-colonial and nationalistic features", according to Douwes. These were contributing factors to Shaykh Saleh's declaration of allegiance to Emir Faisal and the announcement of solidarity with the growing Arab nationalist movement.

On 15 December 1918, Shaykh Saleh called for a meeting of twelve prominent Alawite notables in the town of al-Shaykh Badr. Shaykh Saleh called the meeting in response to news that French military forces were occupying the Syrian coast and were moving to assert their control over the mountains. Shaykh Saleh alerted the attendees at the meeting that the French had already occupied the Syrian coast with the intention of separating the region from the rest of the country, tearing up the flags of the Arabs and urged them to revolt and expel the French from Syria. He succeeded in persuading the attending Shaykhs to contribute fighters to his guerrilla army and confront the French.

== Revolt ==
=== First clash ===
When the French authorities heard of the meeting hosted by Shaykh Saleh, they sent a force from al-Qadmus to al-Shaykh Badr in order to arrest Shaykh Saleh. Shaykh Saleh and his men ambushed the force at the village of Niha, west of Wadi al-Oyoun. The French forces were defeated and suffered more than 35 casualties.

=== Battles in al-Qadmus and Shaykh Badr ===
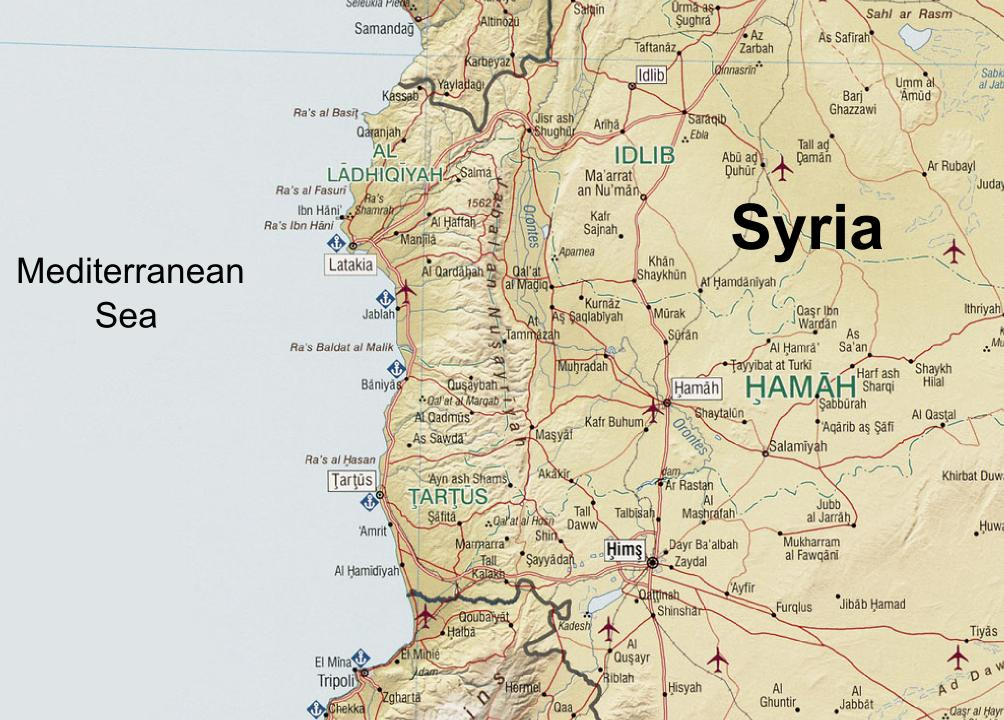
Map of Syria showing the Jabal Ansariyah mountain range

After his victory at Niha, Shaykh Saleh began organizing his rebels into a disciplined force with a general command and military ranks. The rebel army was supported by the local population, and some women supplied water and food and substituted the men as workers in the fields. Shaykh Saleh was also steadily gaining support from other Alawite shaykhs and Sunni Muslim notables from Latakia, Baniyas, Tartus, al-Haffah and elsewhere in the region. However, small bands of Ismaili militiamen, who had been in conflict with Alawite militiamen in the months preceding the revolt, assisted the French military in their attempts to stamp out armed rebellion in the coastal mountains.

Later on, Shaykh Saleh turned against the Ismailis, assaulting them at al-Qadmus, the Khawabi area and Masyaf. The French authorities rushed to the Ismailis' aid and attacked Shaykh Saleh's forces on 21 February 1919, but they were defeated again. The result prompted the British general Edmund Allenby to intervene by requesting Shaykh Saleh cease hostilities and retreat from al-Shaykh Badr. Shaykh Saleh replied positively, but demanded that French forces maintain at least an hour-long distance from al-Shaykh Badr, a demand the French did not accept. Instead, the French took positions in the mountains, installed cannons and began shelling the villages of al-Shaykh Badr and al-Rastan further east in the plains. The ensuing fighting continued on into the night and resulted in the French Army's third defeat to Shaykh Saleh. In the aftermath, Shaykh Saleh once again led an assault against the Ismailis of al-Qadmus, plundering the town and burning Ismaili religious books and manuscripts in the public square. The Ismailis recaptured al-Qadmus in a counterattack on 17 April.

In July 1919, in retaliation to French attacks against rebel positions, Shaykh Saleh attacked and occupied several Ismaili villages that were allied to the French. A truce was subsequently concluded between Shaykh Saleh and the French, and by then, Shaykh Saleh's forces were in full control of Jabal Ansariyah. However, the French breached the truce by occupying and burning the rebel village of Kaf al-Jaz. Shaykh Saleh retaliated by attacking and occupying al-Qadmus from which the French conducted their military operations against him. With the assistance of the Committee of National Defense units from Hama and Homs, Shaykh Saleh subsequently opened a military camp in al-Qadmus to train recruits. Events outside of Jabal Ansariyah contributed to the success of Shaykh Saleh's rebel movement. The two major events were the popular revolt in Talkalakh, a major town just southeast of the mountain, led by the Dandashi clan, and an offensive by the Turkish irregular forces of Mustafa Kemal against the French in Latakia. The Dandashi-led revolt in Talkalakh was backed by the Committee of National Defense units from Homs and Tripoli and armed volunteers from Damascus led by Druze leader Sultan al-Atrash. The rebels in Talkalkah forced the French garrison in that city to withdraw further away from Jabal Ansariyah to Tripoli in the summer of 1919. Meanwhile, the Turkish offensive against Latakia around the same time was halted by a small French force north of the city, but served to distract French forces from fully concentrating on Shaykh Saleh's rebels.

For an entire year after July 1919, French military forces were unable to assert control over Jabal Ansariyah. On 20 February 1920, Shaykh Saleh attacked a French depot in the port city of Tartus, but a French naval counterattack forced his retreat. On 3 April, well into the Franco-Syrian War, the French attacked Shaykh Saleh, inflicting heavy casualties and damage against his force, but Shaykh Saleh's counterattack drove the French out of the villages they had previously conquered. In the summer of 1920, the senior French general in Syria, Henri Gouraud, renewed preparations to take over Jabal Ansariyah and the rest of Syria. Gouraud secured a truce with Mustafa Kemal in May and approached Shaykh Saleh to make a truce on 12 June. Shaykh Saleh did not accept the truce and a week prior to the negotiations of 12 June, he had met with General Yusuf al-'Azma of Faisal's makeshift Arab Army, who requested that Shaykh Saleh continue his resistance against the French military. Shaykh Saleh also received material military support from the Haroun and Shraytih families, which were the two most prominent Sunni Muslim clans of Latakia, and their militias, in addition to similar aid from Faisal's government and Turkish irregulars from southern Anatolia. With this support, Shaykh Saleh opted to continue the armed struggle, despite the defections of some of his partisans and Alawite rivals, all of whom were bribed to drop their support of the revolt by French liaison officers.

=== Suppression ===
The balance of power began to shift in favor of the French when they conquered Damascus and brought an end to the Arab Kingdom of Syria, a day after defeating al-'Azma's makeshift army at the Battle of Maysalun on 24 July 1920. Following the Arab Army defeat at Maysalun, Shaykh Saleh sought to consolidate his position and attacked the French and Ismailis at Masyaf. Despite the setback of losing the Arab government as a source of support, arms and funds, which hindered the progress of the revolt, Shaykh Saleh's rebellion received a boost from the opening of a major front in the Aleppo countryside northeast of Jabal Ansariyah. A revolt led by Ibrahim Hananu had been present there for months, but was intensified following the French occupation of Aleppo on 23 July. The rebel bands in the Aleppo countryside and their operations against the French helped to alleviate pressure from Shaykh Saleh's rebels in the mountains. It also served as a new source of military aid and "much needed moral support", according to historian Phillip S. Khoury.

On 29 November 1920, Gouraud mounted a full-fledged campaign against Shaykh Saleh's forces in Jabal Ansariyah, first attempting to assault Shaykh Saleh's forces at Ayn Qadib near Qadmus, but without success. They then entered Shaykh Saleh's village of al-Shaykh Badr facing no resistance and arrested many Alawite notables, a number of whom were executed or imprisoned. Shaykh Saleh managed to evade arrest and fled to the north, with French forces in pursuit. On 10 February 1921, Shaykh Saleh made official contact with Ibrahim Hananu in order to obtain military assistance. The two men also issued a joint letter to the League of Nations calling for Syria's independence and freedom in line with the League's charter and US President Woodrow Wilson's Fourteen Points proposal. Shaykh Saleh's rebels launched further raids against the French between the winter of 1920 and the early spring of 1921. Documents from the Turkish Military archives (ATASE) show that Salih al-'Ali was directly in contact with the Kemalists for the purpose of receiving weapons. The French military claimed he was taking orders directly from Turkish "headquarters".

Turkish aid came to a halt following renewed peace talks between Mustafa Kemal and the French. Meanwhile, a French force consisting of three columns was assembled and surrounded Shaykh Saleh's positions from Latakia and Baniyas in the west and Hama in the east. Between April and May 1921, several engagements between the French and Shaykh Saleh's rebels gave French forces the military edge, but with heavy French casualties. On 15 June, French forces overran Shaykh Saleh's positions in the northern mountains, but Shaykh Saleh evaded capture again and consequently went into hiding. By the end of the summer, the French military was in control of Jabal Ansariyah.

=== Aftermath ===
A French court-martial in Latakia sentenced Shaykh Saleh to death in absentia, and offered a reward of 100,000 francs for information on his whereabouts, but the latter effort did not succeed. After the French gave up trying to capture Shaykh Saleh, a pardon was issued by General Gouraud. Eventually, after roughly one year of hiding, Shaykh Saleh surrendered to French general Gaston Billotte. In response to a question by Billotte asking Shaykh Saleh why he ultimately surrendered, Shaykh Saleh told him "By God, if I only had ten armed men left to fight, I would not have quit." Shaykh Saleh died at his home in 1950, four years after Syria's independence from French rule.

== See also ==
- Sultan al-Atrash
- Hasan al-Kharrat

== Bibliography ==
- Douwes, Dick (2011). "Modern History of the Nizari Ismailis of Syria". In Farhad, Daftary (ed.). A Modern History of the Ismailis: Continuity and Change in a Muslim Community. I. B. Tauris. ISBN 9781845117177.
- Khoury, Phillip S. (2014). Syria and the French Mandate: The Politics of Arab Nationalism, 1920-1945. Princeton University Press. ISBN 9781400858392.
- Moosa, Matti (1987). Extremist Shiites: The Ghulat Sects. Syracuse University Press. pp. 282–283. ISBN 0-8156-2411-5.
- Moubayed, Sami M. (2006). Steel & Silk: Men & Women Who Shaped Syria 1900-2000. Cune Press. pp. 363–364. ISBN 1-885942-41-9.
- Winter, Stefan (2016). A History of the Alawis: From Medieval Syria to the Turkish Republic. Princeton University Press. ISBN 9780691173894.
