= Salqin =

Salqin سَلْقِين
- Town
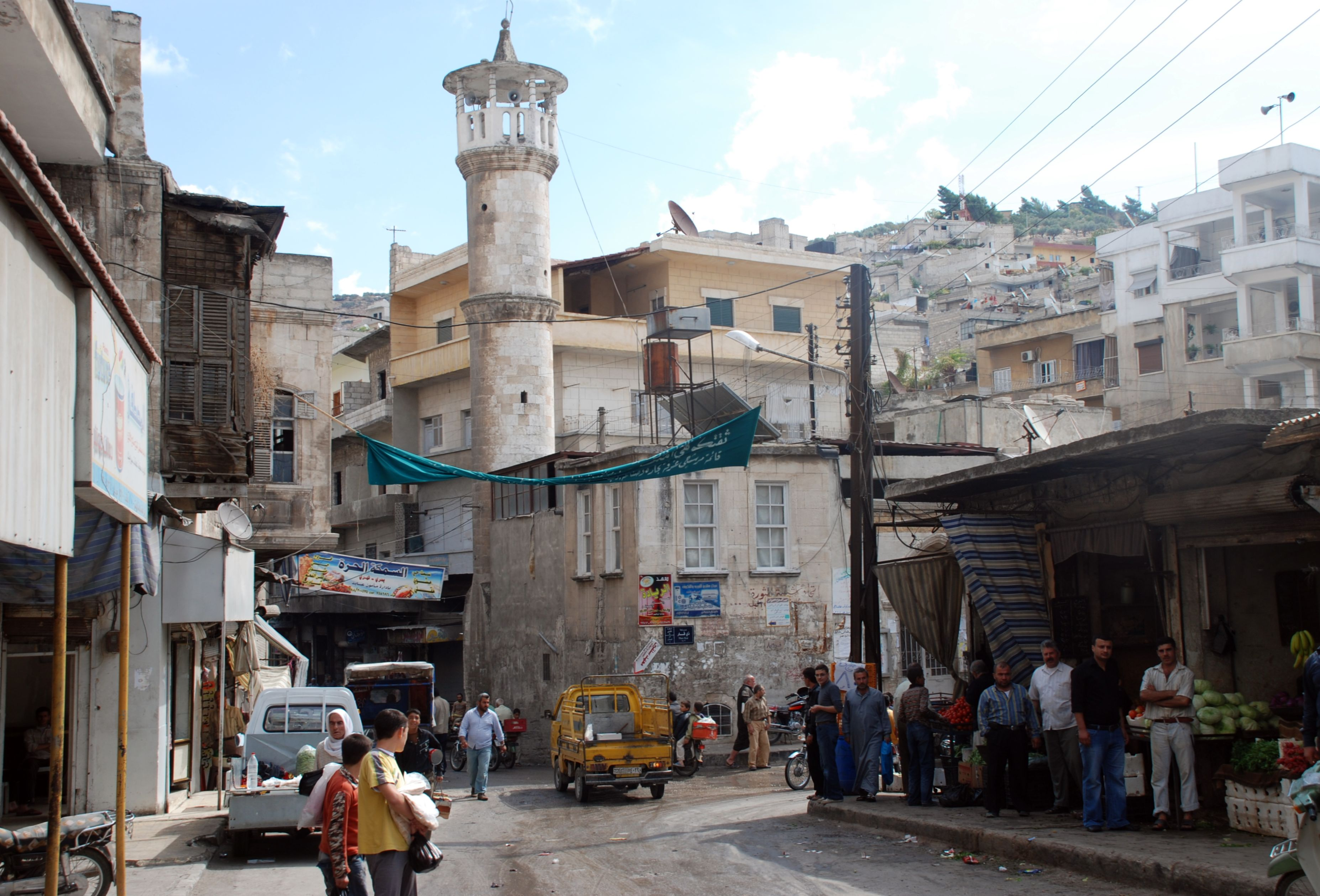
- Street scene in Salqin, 2009

- Location within Syria
- Coordinates: 36°8′18″N 36°27′13″E
- Country: Syria
- Governorate: Idlib
- District: Harem
- Subdistrict: Salqin
- Elevation: 846 m (2,776 ft)

Population (2004)
  - Total: 23,700
- Time zone: UTC+2 (EET)
  - Summer (DST): UTC+3 (EEST)

Salqin (Arabic: سَلْقِين, romanized: Salqīn) is a town in northwestern Syria, administratively part of Idlib Governorate. Nearby localities include Kafr Takharim to the southeast, Abu Talha to the south, Delbiya to the southwest, al-Alani to the northwest and Isqat to the northeast. Salqin is the center of its nahiya (subdistrict). It had a population of 23,700 in 2004. Its inhabitants are predominantly Sunni Muslim.

The town is situated in the southern Orontes River valley and has an altitude of 460 meters above sea level. Olive and other fruit trees surround Salqin. It exports produce from these orchards as well as vegetables. Agriculture is sustained by the large number of springs in Salqin.

== History ==
According to legends, the city was the summer residence of Seleucus I, hence the naming. An inscription, found on a stone between two cypress trees in the village, dates its foundation to 98 BC.

Salqin was mentioned by medieval Muslim historian Izz al-Din ibn Shaddad al-Halabi as the site of one of 22 abandoned or ruined fortresses in the Aleppo region, likely disbanded or destroyed during the Mongol invasions of Syria in the mid to late 13th century. The Mamluks who gained power in the region at that time did not rebuild the fortress in Salqin.

A former education minister and two former governors of Homs and Raqqah were from Salqin. In November 2012, during the Syrian civil war, Syrian rebels captured the town from government forces. According to anti-government activists, around 70% of Salqin's residents still supported the government of Bashar al-Assad in January 2013. This led to tensions, and the killing of a number of pro-Assad activists. On 30 August 2015, 13 people were killed and a number of others wounded when an attacker wearing a suicide belt targeted a judgement house of Jabhat al-Nusra, the majority of salqin city are sunni Muslims with few alawite families were living in the city but they fled it during the syrian war

== Climate ==
Climate data for Salqin
Month	Jan	Feb	Mar	Apr	May	Jun	Jul	Aug	Sep	Oct	Nov	Dec	Year
Mean daily maximum °C (°F)	7.9 (46.2)	9.6 (49.3)	13.8 (56.8)	19.1 (66.4)	24.5 (76.1)	28.5 (83.3)	30.1 (86.2)	30.9 (87.6)	28.3 (82.9)	23.4 (74.1)	16.8 (62.2)	10.4 (50.7)	20.3 (68.5)
Mean daily minimum °C (°F)	1.4 (34.5)	1.9 (35.4)	4.5 (40.1)	7.8 (46.0)	12.0 (53.6)	16.4 (61.5)	19.2 (66.6)	19.4 (66.9)	15.8 (60.4)	11.7 (53.1)	6.8 (44.2)	2.9 (37.2)	10.0 (50.0)
Average precipitation mm (inches)	157 (6.2)	147 (5.8)	124 (4.9)	71 (2.8)	33 (1.3)	13 (0.5)	1 (0.0)	2 (0.1)	15 (0.6)	40 (1.6)	67 (2.6)	177 (7.0)	847 (33.4)
Average snowy days	4	3	0	0	0	0	0	0	0	0	0	2	9
Source: Climate-Data.org

== Notable people ==
- Dima Aktaa – activist and parathlete

== Bibliography ==
- Boulanger, Robert, ed. (1966). The Middle East, Lebanon, Syria, Jordan, Iraq, Iran. Hachette.
- Kate Raphael (2010). Muslim Fortresses in the Levant: Between Crusaders and Mongols. Taylor & Francis. ISBN 9780203845165.
