= Delbiya =

Delbiya دلبيا
- Village
- Location in Syria
- Coordinates: 36°08′N 36°24′E
- Country: Syria
- Governorate: Idlib
- District: Harem District
- Subdistrict: Salqin Nahiyah

Population (2004)
  - Total: 1,204
- Time zone: UTC+2 (EET)
  - Summer (DST): UTC+3 (EEST)
- City Qrya Pcode: C4146

Delbiya (Arabic: دلبيا) is a Syrian village located in Salqin Nahiyah in Harem District, Idlib. According to the Syria Central Bureau of Statistics (CBS), Delbiya had a population of 1,204 in the 2004 census.
