= Ibrahim Hananu =

Syrian politician (1869–1935)

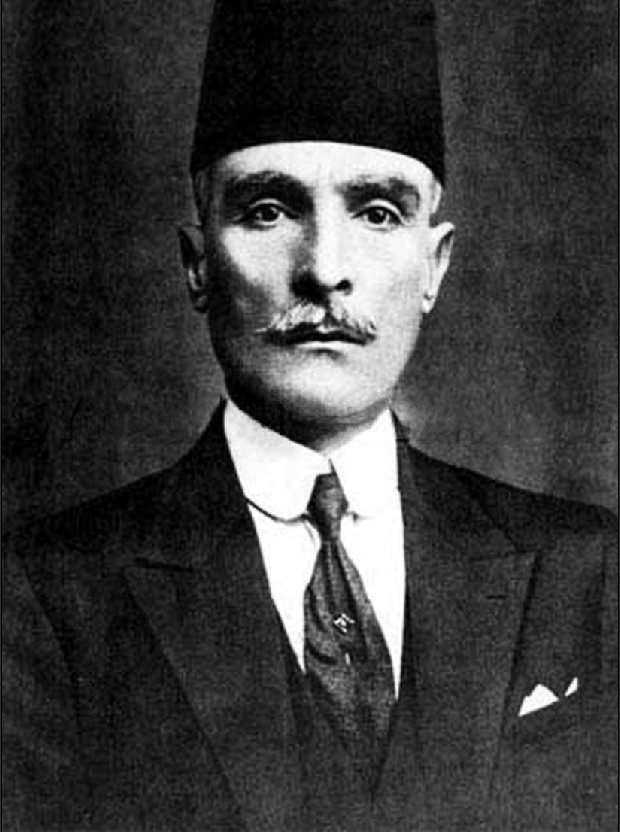
- Portrait of Hananu, 1932
- Born: 1869; Kafr Takharim, Ottoman Syria, Ottoman Empire
- Died: November 21, 1935 (aged 65–66); Aleppo, Syria, Mandate for Syria and the Lebanon
- Resting place: Ibrahim Hanano is buried in Aleppo, Syria, in the cemetery named after him (Ibrahim Hanano Cemetery, also known locally as Maqbarat al-Za'im or Maqbarat Ibrahim Hanano)
- Known for: Leader of the Hananu Revolt Founder and prominent leader of National Bloc (Al-Kutla al-Wataniyya)
- Political party: National Bloc (Al-Kutla al-Wataniyya)
- Children: Nebahat Hananu Tariq Hananu
- Relatives: Ezzat Hanano (Brother) Aqil Hanano (Brother) Haqqi Hanano (Brother) Zakia Hanano (Sister)

Ibrahim Hananu (Note: Arabic: إبراهيم هنانو, romanized: Ibrāhīm Hanānū)(Arabic: ابراهيم هنانو, Kurdish: Îbrahîm henano, ALA-LC: Ibrāhīm Hanānū; 1869-1935) was a Syrian revolutionary and former Ottoman municipal official who led a revolt against the French colonial presence in northern Syria in the early 1920s. He was a member of a notable landholding family of Kurdish origin in northern Syria. He became a major figure in the Arab nationalist movement in northern Syria.

== Early life and education ==
Hananu was born to a wealthy Kurdish family in Kafr Takharim and raised in Aleppo. There is dispute on his birth date: one source mentions he was born in 1879, while another mentions he was born in 1869. He studied at the Imperial High School in Aleppo, and continued his studies at the Ottoman Law Academy of the prestigious Mülkiye school in Istanbul. As a student, he joined the Committee of Union and Progress, the political organ that later took stage following the Young Turk Revolution of 1908.

== Early career and views ==
Upon graduation, Hananu briefly taught at the military academy. Later, he joined the bureaucracy of the Ottoman Empire, only to retire and manage his estates. One Syrian source from the United Arab Republic era indicates that having embraced nationalism when the Arab Revolt broke out in 1916, Hananu joined the Arab army of Faisal I and entered Aleppo with the Allies in 1918. Supposedly, he also joined the secret nationalist society al-Fatat, though there is no corroborating evidence for this. Along with many of the prominent merchants in Aleppo, Hananu became associated with the League of National Defense and the Arab Club of Aleppo.

== The Hananu Revolt ==
Breaking out in the autumn of 1919 in the countryside surrounding Aleppo, when the French army had landed on the Syrian coast and was preparing to occupy all of Syria, Hananu launched his revolt, bringing Aleppo, Idlib and Antakya into a coordinated campaign against French forces. Hananu was responsible for the disarmament of many French troops, the destruction of railroads and telegraph lines, the sabotage of tanks, and the foiling of French attacks on Aleppo. On July 23, 1920, when the French army successfully attacked Aleppo, Hananu was forced to retreat back to his village of Kafr Takharim Nahiyah and began to reorganize the revolt with Najeeb Oweid. The rebels decided to form a civilian government based in Armanaz, and sent Hananu to Turkey as a representative of the new civilian government to request for aid in fighting against the French. He received aid from the Turkish nationalist movement of Mustafa Kemal Atatürk, which was battling the French army of the Levant for control of Cilicia and southern Anatolia. With the withdrawal of Turkish military assistance following the signing of the Franklin-Bouillon Agreement in October 1921, Hananu and his men could no longer sustain a revolt, and their struggle collapsed. Despite the failure of the revolt, the organization of the northern areas of Syria with Turkish help has been interpreted as a prototype for self-government that Hananu and other Syrians built upon in later years.

== Trial ==
In 1922 Ibrahim Hananu was arrested and presented to the French military criminal court on charges of criminal acts. The first sessions of the court was on 15 March 1922 . One of the best lawyers at that time, Fathallah Saqqal defended Hananu, advocated for Hananu's innocence, and argued that Hananu was a political opponent not a criminal.

On 25 March 1922 the French Attorney General requested the execution of Hananu, and he said "if Hananu has seven heads I will cut them all", but the French judge ultimately released Hananu following an agreement between Hananu and the French government.

== Later years ==
Hananu was put under house arrest following the trial and his movements were monitored by the French intelligence. However, Hananu was released after the Great Syrian Revolt of 1925. Hananu went on to play an active role in the Syrian national movement. He was one of the founding fathers of the National Bloc which steered the course of the independence struggle in Syria until its achievement in 1946. He was a member of the National Bloc's permanent council and chief of its political bureau. In 1928, Hananu held office on the Constitutional Assembly that drafted the first republican constitution for Syria. In the 1930s, he affirmed his reputation as a hard-liner, refusing to negotiate with the French until they pledged complete unconditional independence for Syria.

== Designing The Flag of Syria ==
Hananu—a prominent Syrian nationalist leader and hero of the 1920s anti-French revolts—headed the parliamentary committee tasked with drafting the nation's new constitution under the French Mandate. he led the drafting of the constitution for the Syrian Republic that officially created and proposed the design

== Assassination attempt ==
In September 1933, an individual named Nazi Al-Kousa shot Hananu in the legs in his village, Kafr Tkharem. Regarded as an assassination attempt, the shooter was sentenced to 10 years in jail. The French commissioner later pardoned Nazi al-Kousa.

== Death ==
Hananu died in 1935 in Aleppo. His death was attributed to tuberculosis. The three-day mourning period began the day after with newspapers and magazines being published in a black cover. He is considered to be one of the most celebrated individuals in the resistance against the French Mandate.
