= 3rd Chamber of Deputies of Syria =

Legislative term of Syria's parliament from 1943 to 1946

3rd Chamber of Deputies
←	2nd	4th	→

Overview
- Legislative body: Chamber of Deputies
- Jurisdiction: Syria
- Meeting place: Chamber of Deputies Building, Damascus
- Term: 17 August 1943 – 31 May 1947
- Election: 1943
- Government: al-Jabiri I (until 14 October 1944); al-Khoury I (14 October 1944 – 5 April 1945); al-Khoury II (9 April – 23 August 1945); al-Khoury III (26 August – 30 September 1945); al-Jabiri II (30 September 1945 – 25 April 1946); al-Jabiri III (26 April – 27 December 1946); Mardam Bey II (from 29 December 1946)
- Members: 124
- Speaker: Fares al-Khoury (National Bloc) (until 17 October 1944); Saadallah al-Jabiri (National Bloc) (17 October 1944 – 15 September 1945); Fares al-Khoury (National Bloc) (from 16 September 1945)

Sessions
- 1st: 19 October – 30 December 1943
- 2nd: ? – ?
- 3rd: ? – ?
- 4th: ? – ?
- 5th: ? – ?
- 6th: 24 April – 31 May 1946
- 7th: 22 October – 31 December 1946
- 8th: 31 March – 31 May 1947

Special sessions
- 1st: 17–26 August 1943
- 2nd: 3 January 1944 – ?
- 3rd: ? – ?
- 4th: ? – ?
- 5th: ? – ?
- 6th: ? – ?
- 7th: 5–31 January 1946
- 8th: 2 February 1946 – ?
- 9th: 11–22 January 1947

The Third Chamber of Deputies (Arabic: مجلس النواب للدور الاشتراعي الثالث, romanized: Majlis al-Nuwwāb lil-dawr al-ishtirāʻī al-thālith) was the third parliament of the Syrian Republic. It was elected following the 1943 parliamentary election, which marked the restoration of constitutional life under the French Mandate.

The Chamber held its first meeting on 17 August 1943. During the meeting, the chamber elected a speaker and its leadership, and elected Shukri al-Quwatli as president. Shortly thereafter, al-Quwatli appointed Saadallah al-Jabiri to form a government dominated by the National Bloc.

The chamber played a decisive role in Syria's transition to independence, including the abolition of constitutional provisions recognizing the French Mandate.

== Background ==
The elections of 1943 followed a period of political instability and the suspension of constitutional life after 1939. In March 1943, the French authorities appointed a transitional government under Ata al-Ayyubi to oversee new elections and restore parliamentary governance under the 1930 Constitution.

Parliamentary elections were held in July 1943, with results announced on 7 August 1943. The National Bloc achieved a decisive victory.

== Bureau ==
Position	Name	Party	Tenure
Speaker	Fares al-Khoury	National Bloc	17 August 1943 – 16 October 1944; 16 September 1945 – 31 May 1947
Speaker	Saadallah al-Jabiri	National Bloc	17 October 1944 – 15 September 1945
Deputy Speaker	Said al-Ghazzi	National Bloc	17 August 1943 – 16 October 1944; 16 September 1945 – 31 May 1947
Deputy Speaker	Muhammad al-Ayish	Independent	17 August 1943 – 31 May 1947
Deputy Speaker	Najib al-Barazi	National Bloc	17 October 1944 – 15 September 1945
Secretary	Sabri al-Asali	National Bloc	17 August – 18 October 1943
Secretary	Muhammad Suleiman al-Ahmad	National Bloc	19 October 1943 – 31 May 1947
Secretary	Akram al-Hourani	Youth Party	19 October 1943 – 16 October 1944
Secretary	Joseph Ilyan	National Bloc	17 October 1944 – 21 October 1946
Secretary	Najib al-Barazi	National Bloc	16 September 1945 – 21 October 1946
Secretary	Hamid al-Khoja	National Bloc	22 October 1946 – 31 May 1947
Overseer	Ali al-Hayyani		17 August 1943 – 21 October 1946
Overseer	Said Ishaq		17 August 1943 – 21 October 1946
Overseer	Ahmad al-Sharabati	National Bloc	17 August – 18 October 1943
Overseer	Fakhri al-Baroudi		19 October 1943 – 31 May 1947
Overseer	Farid Marhaj		22 October 1946 – 31 May 1947
Overseer	Abd al-Qadir Rahmu		22 October 1946 – 31 May 1947

== Elections of the Burea ==
=== 19 October 1943 ===
The Chamber of Deputies reelected its bureau on the first sitting of the 1st ordinary session on 19 October 1943.

Election of the Speaker
Candidate	Party	Votes	%
Fares al-Khoury	National Bloc	88	100.00
Total		88	100.00
Valid votes		88	94.62
Invalid/blank votes		5	5.38
Total votes		93	100.00
Registered voters/turnout		124	75.00

Election of the Deputy Speakers
Candidate	Party	Votes	%
Said al-Ghazzi	Independent	66	75.00
Muhammad al-Ayish	Independent	65	73.86
Najib al-Barazi	National Bloc	45	51.14
Total		176	100.00
Valid votes		88	100.00
Invalid/blank votes		0	0.00
Total votes		88	100.00
Registered voters/turnout		124	70.97

Election of the Secretaries
Candidate	Party	Votes	%
Muhammad Suleiman al-Ahmad	National Bloc	60	70.59
Akram al-Hourani	Youth Party	54	63.53
Najdat al-Najjari	National Bloc	25	29.41
Adnan al-Atassi	National Bloc	20	23.53
Ahmad Faris al-Zoubi		10	11.76
Total		169	100.00
Valid votes		85	100.00
Invalid/blank votes		0	0.00
Total votes		85	100.00
Registered voters/turnout		124	68.55

Election of the Overseers
Candidate	Votes	%
Said Ishaq	64	68.09
Ali al-Hayyani	61	64.89
Fakhri al-Baroudi	58	61.70
Total	183	100.00
Valid votes	89	94.68
Invalid/blank votes	5	5.32
Total votes	94	100.00
Registered voters/turnout	124	75.81

=== 22 October 1946 ===
The Chamber of Deputies reelected its Bureau at the first sitting of its seventh ordinary session, on 22 October 1946, with 72 deputies present. Fares al-Khoury was elected speaker with 61 votes, against 8 blank ballots. Muhammad al-Ayish and Said al-Ghazzi were elected deputy speakers, with 55 and 53 votes respectively. Hamid al-Khoja and Muhammad Suleiman al-Ahmad were elected secretaries, with 43 and 28 votes respectively. Farid Marhaj, Abd al-Qadir Rahmu, and Fakhri al-Baroudi were elected overseers, with 52, 51, and 40 votes respectively.

== Committees ==
=== 1st Ordinary and 1st Special Session ===
The Chamber's committees were elected for the first special session in August 1943. Deputies were divided into three parliamentary sections to elect the committee members. The same committees were renewed for the first ordinary session on 16 October. On 26 October, these committees elected their Bureaux as follows:

Committees	Burea		Party
Budget Committee	Chair	Said al-Ghazzi	National Bloc
Budget Committee	Vice-Chair	Hikmat al-Hiraki	Independent
Budget Committee	Rapporteur	Nazim al-Qudsi	National Bloc
Constitution Committee	Chair		
Constitution Committee	Vice-Chair		
Constitution Committee	Rapporteur		
Education Committee	Chair	Abd al-Hamid al-Tabba	
Education Committee	Vice-Chair	Ilyas Ubayd	
Education Committee	Rapporteur	Muhammad Suleiman al-Ahmad	National Bloc
Financial Laws Committee	Chair	Wadi Sa'ada	
Financial Laws Committee	Vice-Chair	Ahmad Khalil al-Mudarris	
Financial Laws Committee	Rapporteur	Adnan al-Atassi	National Bloc
Foreign Affairs Committee	Chair	Adnan al-Atassi	National Bloc
Foreign Affairs Committee	Vice-Chair	Ahmad al-Sharabati	National Bloc
Foreign Affairs Committee	Rapporteur	Nazim al-Qudsi	National Bloc
Interior Committee	Chair	Nasib al-Bakri	National Bloc
Interior Committee	Vice-Chair	Hikmat al-Hiraki	Independent
Interior Committee	Rapporteur	Afif al-Sulh	National Bloc
Judicial Committee	Chair	Latif Ghanima	National Bloc
Judicial Committee	Vice-Chair	Sabri al-Asali	National Bloc
Judicial Committee	Rapporteur	Hani al-Sibai	National Bloc
National Defense Committee	Chair	Hasan al-Atrash	Independent
National Defense Committee	Vice-Chair	Ali al-Zawba	
National Defense Committee	Rapporteur	Fakhri al-Baroudi	National Bloc
National Economy Committee	Chair	Najib al-Barazi	National Bloc
National Economy Committee	Vice-Chair	Wahbi al-Hariri	
National Economy Committee	Rapporteur	Ahmad al-Sharabati	National Bloc
Petitions Committee	Chair	Uqla al-Qutami	
Petitions Committee	Vice-Chair	Hikmat al-Hakim	National Bloc
Petitions Committee	Rapporteur	Raif al-Malqi	National Bloc

=== 7th Ordinary Session ===
The Chamber's committees were reelected for the seventh ordinary session on 23 October 1946. On 24 October, these committees elected their Bureaux as follows:

Committees	Burea		Party
Budget Committee	Chair	Said al-Ghazzi	National Bloc
Budget Committee	Vice-Chair	Hikmat al-Hiraki	Independent
Budget Committee	Rapporteur	Hani al-Sibai	National Bloc
Constitution Committee	Chair	Abd al-Rahman al-Kayyali	National Bloc
Constitution Committee	Vice-Chair	Munir al-Abbas	
Constitution Committee	Rapporteur	Hani al-Sibai	National Bloc
Education Committee	Chair	Nasuhi al-Bukhari	Independent
Education Committee	Vice-Chair	Ilyas Ubayd	
Education Committee	Rapporteur	Ahmad Awda	
Endowments Committee (Bureau elected on 11 December 1946)	Chair	Abd al-Hamid al-Tabba	
Endowments Committee (Bureau elected on 11 December 1946)	Vice-Chair	Abd al-Rahman al-Kayyali	National Bloc
Endowments Committee (Bureau elected on 11 December 1946)	Rapporteur	Hikmat al-Hakim	National Bloc
Financial Laws Committee	Chair	Adnan al-Atassi	National Bloc
Financial Laws Committee	Vice-Chair	Wadi Saadeh	
Financial Laws Committee	Rapporteur	Fathallah Asyun	National Bloc
Foreign Affairs Committee	Chair	Na'im al-Antaki	National Bloc
Foreign Affairs Committee	Vice-Chair	Rushdi al-Kikhya	National Bloc
Foreign Affairs Committee	Rapporteur	Adnan al-Atassi	National Bloc
Interior Committee	Chair	Nasib al-Bakri	National Bloc
Interior Committee	Vice-Chair	Hikmat al-Hiraki	Independent
Interior Committee	Rapporteur	Hamid al-Khoja	National Bloc
Judicial Committee	Chair	Hani al-Sibai	National Bloc
Judicial Committee	Vice-Chair	Said al-Ghazzi	National Bloc
Judicial Committee	Rapporteur	Akram al-Hourani	Youth Party
National Defense Committee	Chair	Nasuhi al-Bukhari	Independent
National Defense Committee	Vice-Chair	Fakhri al-Baroudi	National Bloc
National Defense Committee	Rapporteur	Jamal Ali Adib	National Bloc
National Economy Committee	Chair	Abd al-Hamid al-Tabba	
National Economy Committee	Vice-Chair	Ahmad Khalil al-Mudarris	
National Economy Committee	Rapporteur	George Sahnawi	
Petitions Committee	Chair	Fakhri al-Baroudi	National Bloc
Petitions Committee	Vice-Chair	Ahmad Awda	
Petitions Committee	Rapporteur	Muhammad Suleiman al-Ahmad	National Bloc

== Major legislations ==
- Abolishing article 116 of the constitution on 21 August 1943. The article had recognized the French Mandate and given it precedence over the Constitution
- Law on religious courts, issued on 31 January 1945
- Law nationalizing the Hejaz Railway as a public institution, issued on 28 February 1945
- Law approving the Charter of the Arab League, issued on 3 April 1945
- Adoption of the national anthem Ḥumāt ad-Diyār in 1945
- Labor Law, issued on 11 June 1946.
- Law mandating the minting of coins exclusively in silver, issued in 1947.
- Law on the Hejaz Railway System, issued on 12 May 1947.
- Law no. 325 amending the Syrian Parliamentary Elections Law, issued on 21 May 1947. New Article 46 stipulated that elections shall be free, direct, and held in a single round.

== May 1945 crisis ==
On 29 May 1945, as part of the larger Levant Crisis, French forces attacked the parliament building in Damascus after Syrian guards refused to salute the French flag. The assault resulted in the killing of members of the parliamentary guard and the destruction of parts of the building. The attack triggered widespread unrest, including demonstrations and armed clashes, and intensified international pressure on France to end its mandate.

Amid escalating tensions, the Syrian government rejected French demands for military privileges and appealed to the international community.

In 1945, Syrian representatives participated in the San Francisco Conference and signed the Charter of the United Nations. Following continued pressure and a United Nations resolution, French and British forces agreed to withdraw. The evacuation was completed on 17 April 1946, marking full Syrian independence.

== Legacy ==
The Third Chamber of Deputies was instrumental in ending the French Mandate and establishing Syria as an independent state. Its legislative actions, diplomatic initiatives, and resistance to foreign control made it one of the most significant parliamentary terms in Syrian history.

This was the first Syrian parliament to serve its full term with no interruptions. It would be an achievement not repeated again in Syria until the 1st People's Assembly elected in 1973.
