= Third Saadallah al-Jabiri government =

1946 Syrian government

- 34th government of the Syrian Republic

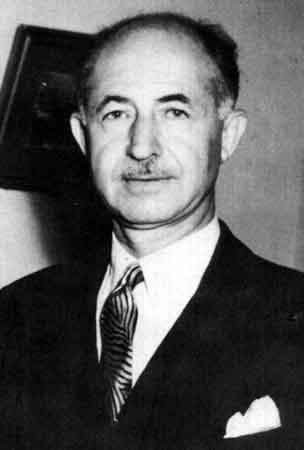
- Date formed: 26 April 1946
- Date dissolved: 27 October 1946

People and organisations
- President: Shukri al-Quwatli
- Prime Minister: Saadallah al-Jabiri
- Prime Minister's history: al-Jabiri I al-Jabiri II
- No. of ministers: 7
- Member parties: ▌National Bloc; ▌Independent

History
- Legislature term: 3rd Chamber of Deputies
- Predecessor: al-Jabiri II
- Successor: Mardam Bey II

The Third Saadallah al-Jabiri government was the thirty-fourth government in the history of modern Syria and the nineteenth administration of the First Syrian Republic. Formed on 27 April 1946, it was the sixth government to serve under President Shukri al-Quwatli and the first Syrian government after the achievement of independence from the French Mandate.

During its tenure, the government carried out several important administrative reforms, most notably the adoption of the Labour Law. It also advanced a foreign policy concept later associated with Syria's proposal for positive neutrality during the early period of the Cold War.

The government remained in office for approximately eight months before resigning due to the deteriorating health of Prime Minister Saadallah al-Jabiri.

== Composition ==
Portfolio	Minister	Took office	Left office	Party
Prime Minister	Saadallah al-Jabiri	30 September 1945	27 October 1946	National Bloc
Minister of Foreign Affairs	Saadallah al-Jabiri	30 September 1945	27 October 1946	National Bloc
Minister of Justice	Khalid al-Azm	26 April 1946	27 October 1946	Independent
Minister of National Economy	Khalid al-Azm	26 April 1946	27 October 1946	Independent
Minister of National Defense	Nabih al-Azma	26 April 1946	27 October 1946	National Bloc
Minister of Interior	Sabri al-Asali	26 April 1946	27 October 1946	National Bloc
Minister of Education	Ahmad al-Sharabati	26 April 1946	17 June 1946	National Bloc
Minister of Education	Adil Arslan	17 June 1946	27 October 1946	National Bloc
Minister of Public Works	Mikhail Ilyan	26 April 1946	27 October 1946	National Bloc
Minister of Finance	Edmond Al-Homsi	26 April 1946	27 October 1946	National Bloc

== See also ==
- Council of Ministers (Syria)
- List of Syrian governments
- Government ministries of Syria
- List of prime ministers of Syria
