= Third Fares al-Khoury government =

1945 Syrian government

- 32nd government of the Syrian Republic

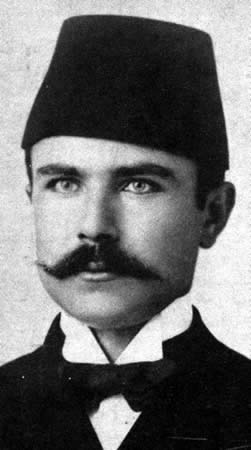
- Date formed: 26 August 1945
- Date dissolved: 30 September 1945

People and organisations
- President: Shukri al-Quwatli
- General Delegate: Paul Beynet
- Prime Minister: Fares al-Khoury
- Prime Minister's history: al-Khoury I al-Khoury II
- No. of ministers: 8
- Member parties: ▌National Bloc; ▌Independent

History
- Legislature term: 3rd Chamber of Deputies
- Predecessor: al-Khoury II
- Successor: al-Jabiri II

The Third Fares al-Khoury government was the thirty-second government in the history of modern Syria and the seventeenth administration of the First Syrian Republic. Formed on 26 August 1945, it was the fourth government to serve under President Shukri al-Quwatli. The government was established during a period of increasing political tensions within the National Bloc, which had dominated Syrian politics since the end of the French Mandate.

The government was short-lived, surviving for only about one month before internal disagreements among leading members of the National Bloc led to its resignation. Shortly after its formation, the Chamber of Deputies raised constitutional objections to the cabinet on the grounds that it consisted of eight ministers, whereas the constitution limited the number of ministers to seven. In response, Ahmad al-Sharabati resigned from the government. Despite this adjustment, political divisions within the ruling bloc continued to deepen, ultimately bringing the government's tenure to an early end.

== Composition ==
Portfolio	Minister	Took office	Left office	Party
Prime Minister	Fares al-Khoury	14 October 1944	30 September 1945	National Bloc
Minister of Interior	Lutfi al-Haffar	26 August 1945	30 September 1945	National Bloc
Minister of Finance	Khalid al-Azm	26 August 1945	30 September 1945	Independent
Minister of National Defense	Khalid al-Azm	26 August 1945	30 September 1945	Independent
Minister of Justice	Sabri al-Asali	26 August 1945	30 September 1945	National Bloc
Minister of Education	Ahmad al-Sharabati	14 March 1945	30 September 1945	National Bloc
Minister of National Economy	Ahmad al-Sharabati	7 April 1945	30 September 1945	National Bloc
Minister of Public Works	Hikmat al-Hakim	7 April 1945	30 September 1945	National Bloc
Minister of Provisions and Supply	Hasan Jabbarah	21 April 1945	30 September 1945	Independent
Minister of Foreign Affairs	Mikhail Ilyan	26 August 1945	30 September 1945	National Bloc

== See also ==
- Council of Ministers (Syria)
- List of Syrian governments
- Government ministries of Syria
- List of prime ministers of Syria
