= Fares al-Khoury government =

Fares al-Khoury government may refer to the following governments of Syrian Prime Minister Fares al-Khoury:

- First Fares al-Khoury government (1944–Apr 1945)
- Second Fares al-Khoury government (Apr 1945–Aug 1945)
- Third Fares al-Khoury government (Aug 1945–Sep 1945)
- Fourth Fares al-Khoury government (1954–1955)
