= Fourth Jamil Mardam Bey government =

1948 Syrian government

- 37th government of the Syrian Republic

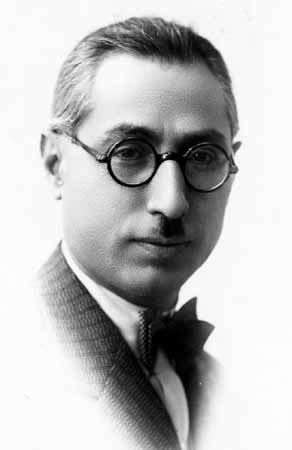
- Date formed: 23 August 1948
- Date dissolved: 2 December 1948

People and organisations
- President: Shukri al-Quwatli
- Prime Minister: Jamil Mardam Bey
- Prime Minister's history: Mardam Bey I Mardam Bey II; Mardam Bey III
- Deputy Prime Minister: Lutfi al-Haffar
- No. of ministers: 11
- Member parties: ▌National Party; ▌Independent
- Opposition party: ▌People's Party; ▌Ba'ath Party

History
- Legislature term: 4th Chamber of Deputies
- Predecessor: Mardam Bey III
- Successor: K. al-Azm II

The Fourth Jamil Mardam Bey government was the thirty-seventh government in the history of modern Syria and the twenty-second administration of the First Syrian Republic. Formed on 23 August 1948 following the beginning of President Shukri al-Quwatli's second term in office, it was the eighth government to serve under his presidency and the fourth and final cabinet headed by Jamil Mardam Bey The government took office amid a severe political crisis caused by the Arab defeat in the 1948 Arab–Israeli War and the growing public dissatisfaction with Syria's political leadership.

During its brief tenure, the government faced intense criticism from both parliament and the public. When the cabinet convened an extraordinary session of the Chamber of Deputies to discuss the consequences of the war, debates escalated into physical confrontations among deputies. The government also ordered the arrest of several prominent opposition figures, including Michel Aflaq, founder of the Arab Socialist Ba'ath Party, following their sharp criticism of both the government and President al-Quwatli. Although a state of emergency was imposed during this period, the authorities were unable to contain the widespread protests that erupted in late 1948, coinciding with the first anniversary of the United Nations Partition Plan for Palestine.

Growing political instability ultimately forced the government to resign on 1 December 1948. President al-Quwatli was initially unable to form a successor government, and after twelve days – the longest government formation crisis in Syria up to that time – Khalid al-Azm succeeded in forming a new government. As a result, the Fourth Jamil Mardam Bey government became the last administration headed by Mardam Bey and one of the shortest–lived governments of the First Syrian Republic.

== Composition ==
Portfolio	Minister	Took office	Left office	Party
Prime Minister	Jamil Mardam Bey	28 October 1946	2 December 1948	Independent
Minister of National Defense	Jamil Mardam Bey	23 May 1948	2 December 1948	Independent
Deputy Prime Minister	Lutfi al-Haffar	23 August 1948	2 December 1948	National Party
Minister of State	Lutfi al-Haffar	23 August 1948	2 December 1948	National Party
Minister of Justice	Said al-Ghazzi	23 August 1948	2 December 1948	Independent
Minister of Foreign Affairs	Muhsin al-Barazi	23 August 1948	2 December 1948	Independent
Minister of Agriculture	Muhammad al-Ayish (acting)	23 August 1948	2 December 1948	Independent
Minister of State	Muhammad al-Ayish	23 August 1948	2 December 1948	Independent
Minister of Interior	Sabri al-Asali	23 August 1948	2 December 1948	National Party
Minister of Economy	Mikhail Ilyan	23 August 1948	2 December 1948	National Party
Minister of Health and Social Affairs	Adil Arslan	23 August 1948	2 December 1948	Independent
Minister of Public Works	Ahmad al-Rifai	6 October 1947	2 December 1948	Independent
Minister of Finance	Wahbi al-Hariri	6 October 1947	2 December 1948	Independent
Minister of Education	Munir al-Ajlani	6 October 1947	2 December 1948	Independent

== See also ==
- Council of Ministers (Syria)
- List of Syrian governments
- Government ministries of Syria
- List of prime ministers of Syria
