= First Ata Bey al-Ayyubi government =

1936 Syrian government

- 19th government of the Syrian Republic

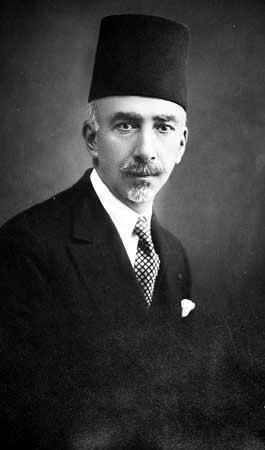
- Date formed: 23 February 1936
- Date dissolved: 21 December 1936

People and organisations
- President: Muhammad Ali al-Abid
- High Commissioner: Damien de Martel
- Prime Minister: Ata Bey al-Ayyubi
- No. of ministers: 5
- Member parties: ▌National Bloc; ▌Independent

History
- Legislature term: –
- Predecessor: al-Hasani II
- Successor: Mardam Bey I

The First Ata Bey al-Ayyubi government was the nineteenth government in the history of modern Syria, serving from 23 February 1936 until 21 December 1936. Formed by decrees numbered 141 to 146 and published in the Official Gazette of the Syrian Republic, it was the fourth government of the First Syrian Republic and the fourth to serve under President Muhammad Ali al-Abid.

The government was established in the aftermath of the 1936 Syrian general strike and the widespread demonstrations that took place in early 1936 against French Mandate rule. It was conceived as a temporary and politically neutral administration tasked with overseeing parliamentary elections while the Syrian delegation negotiated a treaty with France in Paris. Following the delegation's successful conclusion of negotiations and its return to Syria in September 1936, parliamentary elections were held in November, and the newly elected Chamber of Deputies convened on 21 December 1936. The following day, President al-Abid resigned for health reasons, rendering the government constitutionally resigned and bringing its tenure to an end.

== Composition ==
Portfolio	Minister	Took office	Left office	Party
Prime Minister	Ata Bey al-Ayyubi	23 February 1936	21 December 1936	Independent
Minister of Interior	Ata Bey al-Ayyubi	23 February 1936	21 December 1936	Independent
Minister of Finance	Edmond Al-Homsi	23 February 1936	21 December 1936	National Bloc
Minister of Justice	Said al-Ghazzi	23 February 1936	21 December 1936	Independent
Minister of Education	Mustafa al-Shihabi	23 February 1936	21 December 1936	Independent
Minister of National Economy	Mustafa al-Qusayri	23 February 1936	21 December 1936	Independent

== See also ==
- Council of Ministers (Syria)
- List of Syrian governments
- Government ministries of Syria
- List of prime ministers of Syria
