= Nasuhi al-Bukhari government =

1939 Syrian government

- 22nd government of the Syrian Republic

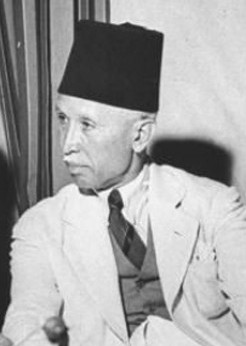
- Date formed: 5 April 1939
- Date dissolved: 15 May 1939

People and organisations
- President: Hashim al-Atassi
- High Commissioner: Gabriel Puaux
- Prime Minister: Nasuhi al-Bukhari
- No. of ministers: 5
- Member party: ▌Independent
- Opposition party: ▌National Bloc

History
- Legislature term: 2nd Chamber of Deputies
- Predecessor: al-Haffar
- Successor: al-Khatib

The Nasuhi al-Bukhari government was the twenty-second government in the history of modern Syria and the seventh to serve during the First Syrian Republic. It was formed on 5 April 1939 by decrees numbered 338 to 343 and published in the Official Gazette of the Syrian Republic. Established amid a deep political crisis triggered by the 1939 protests and the controversy surrounding the Sanjak of Alexandretta, the government was composed entirely of independent, non-partisan figures in an effort to reduce tensions between the authorities and the opposition-led National Bloc, which held a parliamentary majority.

Led by Nasuhi al-Bukhari, whose governing style was often described as military in character, the government pledged to pursue national dialogue and restore stability. However, it failed to halt the ongoing demonstrations over the Alexandretta issue and the influx of refugees from the territory into Damascus. Facing increasing political pressure and unable to secure parliamentary support, the government resigned on 4 July 1939. Its resignation was followed three days later by that of President Hashim al-Atassi, after which the French High Commissioner suspended the constitution, dissolved parliament, and assumed direct authority, replacing the cabinet with an administration of directors.

== Composition ==
Portfolio	Minister	Took office	Left office	Party
Prime Minister	Nasuhi al-Bukhari	5 April 1939	15 May 1939	Independent
Minister of Interior	Nasuhi al-Bukhari	5 April 1939	15 May 1939	Independent
Minister of National Defense	Nasuhi al-Bukhari	5 April 1939	15 May 1939	Independent
Minister of Justice	Khalid al-Azm	5 April 1939	15 May 1939	Independent
Minister of Foreign Affairs	Khalid al-Azm	5 April 1939	15 May 1939	Independent
Minister of Education	Hassan al-Hakim	5 April 1939	15 May 1939	Independent
Minister of Finance	Muhammad Khalil al-Mudarris	5 April 1939	15 May 1939	Independent
Minister of National Economy	Selim Janbart	23 February 1939	15 May 1939	Independent

== See also ==
- Council of Ministers (Syria)
- List of Syrian governments
- Government ministries of Syria
- List of prime ministers of Syria
