= Third Jamil Mardam Bey government =

1947–1948 Syrian government

- 36th government of the Syrian Republic

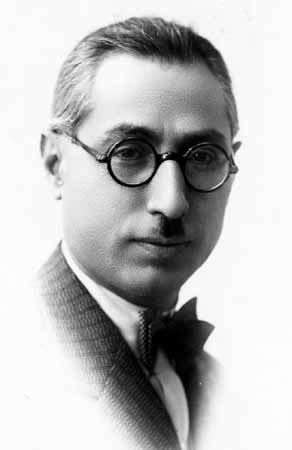
- Date formed: 6 October 1947
- Date dissolved: 19 August 1948

People and organisations
- President: Shukri al-Quwatli
- Prime Minister: Jamil Mardam Bey
- Prime Minister's history: Mardam Bey I Mardam Bey II
- No. of ministers: 7 (until 1948); 6 (from 1948)
- Member party: ▌Independent

History
- Election: 1947
- Legislature term: 4th Chamber of Deputies
- Predecessor: Mardam Bey II
- Successor: Mardam Bey IV

The Third Jamil Mardam Bey government was the thirty-sixth government in the history of modern Syria and the twenty-first administration of the First Syrian Republic. Formed on 6 October 1947 following the parliamentary elections of 1947, it was the seventh government to serve under President Shukri al-Quwatli and the third cabinet headed by Jamil Mardam Bey. The government was composed primarily of members of the People's Party, alongside independent and nationalist politicians.

The cabinet is often remembered as the "Nakba Government" because it governed Syria during the 1948 Arab–Israeli War. Prior to the outbreak of hostilities, Mardam Bey publicly predicted that the conflict would be brief and that the Arab armies would decisively defeat the emerging Israeli state. During its tenure, the government authorized military mobilization, encouraged public enlistment in the armed forces, approved extraordinary military expenditures through parliament, and hosted the Damascus Conference, convened on 11 May 1948 to coordinate Arab policy regarding Palestine.

One of the government's most significant domestic actions was the amendment of the constitution to permit President Shukri al-Quwatli to seek a second term in office. The constitutional amendment was adopted on 18 April 1948, and al-Quwatli was subsequently re-elected president. In accordance with constitutional practice, the government resigned following the president's inauguration for a second term on 23 August 1948. The cabinet was also notable for being the first government in modern Syrian history not to include any Christian ministers.

== Composition ==
Portfolio	Minister	Took office	Left office	Party
Prime Minister	Jamil Mardam Bey	28 October 1946	19 August 1948	Independent
Minister of Foreign Affairs and Expatriates	Jamil Mardam Bey	6 October 1947	19 August 1948	Independent
Minister of National Economy	Said al-Ghazzi	6 October 1947	19 August 1948	Independent
Minister of National Defense	Ahmad al-Sharabati	28 October 1946	23 May 1948	Independent
Minister of National Defense	Jamil Mardam Bey	23 May 1948	19 August 1948	Independent
Minister of Interior	Muhsin al-Barazi	6 October 1947	19 August 1948	Independent
Minister of Health and Ambulance	Muhsin al-Barazi	6 October 1947	19 August 1948	Independent
Minister of Justice	Ahmad al-Rifai	6 October 1947	19 August 1948	Independent
Minister of Public Works	Ahmad al-Rifai	6 October 1947	19 August 1948	Independent
Minister of Finance	Wahbi al-Hariri	6 October 1947	19 August 1948	Independent
Minister of Education	Munir al-Ajlani	6 October 1947	19 August 1948	Independent

== See also ==
- Council of Ministers (Syria)
- List of Syrian governments
- Government ministries of Syria
- List of prime ministers of Syria
