= Second Jamil Mardam Bey government =

1946–1947 Syrian government

- 35th government of the Syrian Republic

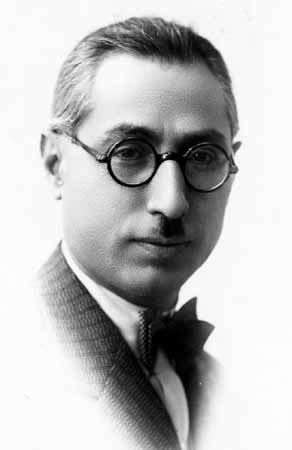
- Date formed: 28 December 1946
- Date dissolved: 2 October 1947

People and organisations
- President: Shukri al-Quwatli
- Prime Minister: Jamil Mardam Bey
- Prime Minister's history: Mardam Bey I
- No. of ministers: 7
- Member party: ▌Independent

History
- Legislature term: 3rd Chamber of Deputies
- Predecessor: al-Jabiri III
- Successor: Mardam Bey III

The Second Jamil Mardam Bey government was the thirty-fifth government in the history of modern Syria, the twentieth administration of the First Syrian Republic, the seventh government to serve under President Shukri al-Quwatli, and the second government formed after Syrian independence. It was also the second government headed by Jamil Mardam Bey. Formed on 28 December 1946, the government reflected a new political alignment following the decline of the National Bloc, with Mardam Bey assembling a broad coalition of politically independent figures and representatives from both the National Party and the People's Party in an effort to create a government of national unity.

The government secured the confidence of the Chamber of Deputies by a vote of 58 to 33, with most opposition votes coming from deputies aligned with former prime minister Saadallah al-Jabiri. During its tenure, the government enacted several important reforms, most notably abolishing the two-stage electoral system and introducing direct parliamentary elections based on universal voting procedures. It also adopted a new law regulating Islamic religious endowments (awqaf) and organised the parliamentary elections of 1947, the first elections held after the evacuation of French forces from Syria. The elections were secured by the Syrian Army and were widely regarded as successful and orderly. Their results weakened the political dominance of the National Bloc, and, following the convening of the newly elected parliament, the government resigned in accordance with constitutional practice.

== Composition ==
Portfolio	Minister	Took office	Left office	Party
Prime Minister	Jamil Mardam Bey	28 October 1946	2 October 1947	Independent
Minister of Interior	Jamil Mardam Bey	28 October 1946	2 October 1947	Independent
Minister of Health and Ambulance	Jamil Mardam Bey	28 October 1946	2 October 1947	Independent
Minister of Finance	Said al-Ghazzi	28 October 1946	2 October 1947	Independent
Minister of Foreign Affairs	Na'im al-Antaki	28 October 1946	2 October 1947	Independent
Minister of National Defense	Ahmad al-Sharabati	28 October 1946	2 October 1947	Independent
Minister of National Economy	Hikmat al-Hakim	28 October 1946	2 October 1947	Independent
Minister of Education	Adil Arslan	17 June 1946	2 October 1947	Independent
Minister of Justice	Adnan al-Atassi	28 October 1946	2 October 1947	Independent
Minister of Public Works	Adnan al-Atassi	28 October 1946	2 October 1947	Independent

== See also ==
- Council of Ministers (Syria)
- List of Syrian governments
- Government ministries of Syria
- List of prime ministers of Syria
