= Second Saadallah al-Jabiri government =

1945–1946 Syrian government

- 33rd government of the Syrian Republic

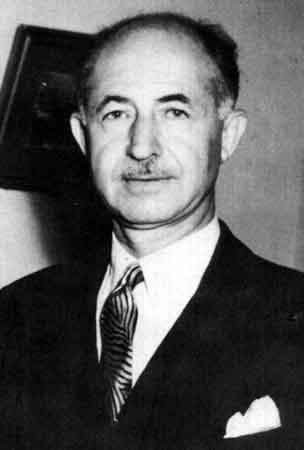
- Date formed: 30 September 1945
- Date dissolved: 25 April 1946

People and organisations
- President: Shukri al-Quwatli
- General Delegate: Paul Beynet
- Prime Minister: Saadallah al-Jabiri
- Prime Minister's history: al-Jabiri I
- No. of ministers: 5 (until 1945); 6 (from 1945)
- Member party: ▌National Bloc

History
- Legislature term: 3rd Chamber of Deputies
- Predecessor: al-Khoury III
- Successor: al-Jabiri III

The Second Saadallah al-Jabiri government was the thirty-third government in the history of modern Syria and the eighteenth government of the First Syrian Republic. Formed on 30 September 1945, it was the fifth government to serve under President Shukri al-Quwatli. It was established following the resignation of the previous government led by Faris al-Khoury, with Saadallah al-Jabiri returning as prime minister.

The government served during the final stage of the struggle for Syrian independence. During its tenure, the United Nations Security Council approved the final withdrawal of French forces from Syria in February 1946, a decision that was implemented on 17 April 1946, later commemorated as Evacuation Day and Syria's national day. The government resigned shortly after the completion of the French withdrawal.

Upon taking office, al-Jabiri presented his government's position as a constitutional administration committed to cooperation between the presidency, parliament, and cabinet. He emphasised independence, political stability, and strengthening state authority, while pledging to address economic and social issues, including unemployment, agricultural development, and relations between labour and capital. The government was formed during a period of major political transition as Syria moved from the French Mandate era toward full independence.

== Composition ==
Portfolio	Minister	Took office	Left office	Party
Prime Minister	Saadallah al-Jabiri	30 September 1945	25 April 1946	National Bloc
Minister of Foreign Affairs	Saadallah al-Jabiri	30 September 1945	25 April 1946	National Bloc
Minister of National Defense	Saadallah al-Jabiri	30 September 1945	25 April 1946	National Bloc
Minister of Interior	Lutfi al-Haffar	26 August 1945	25 April 1946	National Bloc
Minister of Finance	Na'im al-Antaki	30 September 1945	25 April 1946	National Bloc
Minister of Public Works	Na'im al-Antaki (acting)	30 September 1945	1 December 1945	National Bloc
Minister of Public Works	Fathallah Saqqal	1 December 1945	25 April 1946	Independent
Minister of Justice	Sabri al-Asali	26 August 1945	25 April 1946	National Bloc
Minister of Education	Sabri al-Asali	30 September 1945	25 April 1946	National Bloc
Minister of National Economy	Hasan Jabbarah	30 September 1945	25 April 1946	Independent
Minister of Provisions and Supply	Hasan Jabbarah	21 April 1945	25 April 1946	Independent

== See also ==
- Council of Ministers (Syria)
- List of Syrian governments
- Government ministries of Syria
- List of prime ministers of Syria
