= Second Fares al-Khoury government =

1945 Syrian government

- 31st government of the Syrian Republic

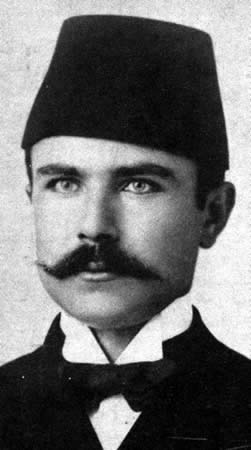
- Date formed: 7 April 1945
- Date dissolved: 23 August 1945

People and organisations
- President: Shukri al-Quwatli
- General Delegate: Paul Beynet
- Prime Minister: Fares al-Khoury
- Prime Minister's history: al-Khoury I
- No. of ministers: 7 (until 21 April); 8 (from 21 April)
- Member parties: ▌National Bloc; ▌Independent

History
- Legislature term: 3rd Chamber of Deputies
- Predecessor: al-Khoury I
- Successor: al-Khoury III

The Second Fares al-Khoury government was the thirty-first government in the history of modern Syria and the sixteenth administration of the First Syrian Republic. Formed on 9 April 1945, it was the third government to serve under President Shukri al-Quwatli.

During its tenure, the government oversaw several major developments in Syrian and international affairs. Syria declared war on Nazi Germany and Japan on 26 March 1945 as part of the final stages of the Second World War. The period also witnessed the signing of the United Nations Charter and the establishment of the Arab League, in which Syria participated as a founding member.

The government faced a major crisis during the Syrian Independence Uprising of 1945, which followed the return of Prime Minister Fares al-Khoury from San Francisco, where he had led the Syrian delegation at the conference that established the United Nations. The French bombardment of Damascus during the uprising led to widespread unrest and ultimately resulted in the resignation of the government.

== Composition ==
| Portfolio | Minister | Took office | Left office | Party |
|---|---|---|---|---|
| Prime Minister | Fares al-Khoury | 14 October 1944 | 23 August 1945 | National Bloc |
| Minister of Foreign Affairs | Jamil Mardam Bey | 19 August 1943 | 23 August 1945 | National Bloc |
| Minister of National Defense | Jamil Mardam Bey | 14 October 1944 | 23 August 1945 | National Bloc |
| Minister of Justice | Said al-Ghazzi | 7 April 1945 | 23 August 1945 | Independent |
| Minister of Provisions and Supply | Said al-Ghazzi (acting) | 7 April 1945 | 21 April 1945 | Independent |
| Minister of Provisions and Supply | Hasan Jabbarah | 21 April 1945 | 23 August 1945 | Independent |
| Head of Endowments and Fatwas (Note: The Department of Endowments and Fatwas fell under the authority of the Prime Ministry. Yet, since al-Khoury was a Christian, al-Ghazzi was entrusted with overseeing the department.) | Said al-Ghazzi | 7 April 1945 | 23 August 1945 | Independent |
| Minister of Finance | Na'im al-Antaki | 7 April 1945 | 23 August 1945 | National Bloc |
| Minister of Interior | Sabri al-Asali | 14 March 1945 | 23 August 1945 | National Bloc |
| Minister of Education | Ahmad al-Sharabati | 14 March 1945 | 23 August 1945 | National Bloc |
| Minister of National Economy | Ahmad al-Sharabati | 7 April 1945 | 23 August 1945 | National Bloc |
| Minister of Public Works | Hikmat al-Hakim | 7 April 1945 | 23 August 1945 | National Bloc |

== See also ==
- Council of Ministers (Syria)
- List of Syrian governments
- Government ministries of Syria
- List of prime ministers of Syria
