= First Fares al-Khoury government =

1944–1945 Syrian government

- 30th government of the Syrian Republic

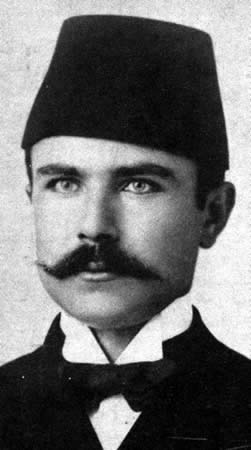
- Date formed: 14 October 1944
- Date dissolved: 5 April 1945

People and organisations
- President: Shukri al-Quwatli
- General Delegate: Paul Beynet
- Prime Minister: Fares al-Khoury
- No. of ministers: 4 (until 1945); 6 (from 1945)
- Member parties: ▌National Bloc; ▌Independent

History
- Legislature term: 3rd Chamber of Deputies
- Predecessor: al-Jabiri I
- Successor: al-Khoury II

The First Fares al-Khoury government was the thirtieth government in the history of modern Syria and the fifteenth administration of the First Syrian Republic. Formed on 14 October 1944, it was the second government to serve under President Shukri al-Quwatli and marked a notable milestone in Syrian political history, as al-Khoury became the first Syrian Christian to hold the office of prime minister.

Because the prime minister was formally responsible for the administration of religious endowments and the office of the Grand Mufti, al-Khoury delegated these responsibilities to the Minister of Justice during his tenure. The government continued the process of consolidating Syrian sovereignty and state institutions during the final years of the French Mandate, while maintaining the dominant political position of the National Bloc under President al-Quwatli.

== Composition ==
Portfolio	Minister	Took office	Left office	Party
Prime Minister	Fares al-Khoury	14 October 1944	5 April 1945	National Bloc
Minister of Interior	Fares al-Khoury	14 October 1944	14 March 1945	National Bloc
Minister of Interior	Sabri al-Asali	14 March 1945	5 April 1945	National Bloc
Minister of Education	Fares al-Khoury	14 October 1944	14 March 1945	National Bloc
Minister of Education	Ahmad al-Sharabati	14 March 1945	5 April 1945	National Bloc
Minister of Foreign Affairs	Jamil Mardam Bey	19 August 1943	5 April 1945	National Bloc
Minister of National Defense	Jamil Mardam Bey	14 October 1944	5 April 1945	National Bloc
Minister of National Economy	Jamil Mardam Bey	14 October 1944	5 April 1945	National Bloc
Minister of Finance	Khalid al-Azm	19 August 1943	5 April 1945	Independent
Minister of Provisions and Supply	Khalid al-Azm	14 October 1944	5 April 1945	Independent
Minister of Justice	Abd al-Rahman al-Kayyali	14 October 1944	5 April 1945	National Bloc
Minister of Public Works	Abd al-Rahman al-Kayyali	19 August 1943	5 April 1945	National Bloc
Head of Endowments and Fatwas (Note: The Department of Endowments and Fatwas fell under the authority of the Prime Ministry. Yet, since al-Khoury was a Christian, al-Kayyali was entrusted with overseeing the department.)	Abd al-Rahman al-Kayyali	14 October 1944	5 April 1945	National Bloc

== See also ==
- Council of Ministers (Syria)
- List of Syrian governments
- Government ministries of Syria
- List of prime ministers of Syria

== See also ==
- Council of Ministers (Syria)
- List of Syrian governments
- Government ministries of Syria
- List of prime ministers of Syria
