= 4th Chamber of Deputies of Syria =

Legislative term of Syria's parliament from 1947 to 1949

4th Chamber of Deputies
←	3rd	Cons.	→

Overview
- Legislative body: Chamber of Deputies
- Jurisdiction: Syria
- Meeting place: Chamber of Deputies Building, Damascus
- Term: 27 September 1947 – 30 March 1949
- Election: 1947
- Government: Mardam Bey III (until 19 August 1949); Mardam Bey IV (23 August – 2 December 1948); K. al-Azm II (from 16 December 1948)
- Members: 136 (Note: The elections to fill the five seats in Jabal al-Druze Governorate were postponed and were not held until January 1949.)
- Speaker: Fares al-Khoury (People's Party)

Sessions
- 1st: 8 November – 30 December 1947
- 2nd: 19 October 1947 – 31 May 1948
- 3rd: 20 November – 28 December 1948
- 4th: 24–30 March 1949

Special sessions
- 1st: 27 September – 16 October 1947
- 2nd: 3–20 January 1948
- 3rd: 17 August – 18 October 1948
- 4th: 4–31 January 1949
- 5th: 3 February – 19 March 1949

The Fourth Chamber of Deputies (Arabic: مجلس النواب للدور الاشتراعي الرابع, romanized: Majlis al-Nuwwāb lil-dawr al-ishtirāʻī al-rābiʻ) was the fourth parliament of the Syrian Republic and the first elected following full independence from France.

Elected in the 1947 parliamentary election, the chamber convened on 27 September 1947 and remained in session until it was dissolved following the military coup of Husni al-Za'im on 30 March 1949.

The chamber operated during a critical period marked by post-independence state-building, constitutional change, and the impact of the 1948 Arab–Israeli War.

== Bureau ==
Position	Name	Party	Tenure
Speaker	Fares al-Khoury	People's Party	27 September 1947 – 30 March 1949
Deputy Speaker	Muhammad al-Ayish	Independent	27 September 1947 – 19 November 1948
Deputy Speaker	Hani al-Sibai	People's Party	27 September – 7 November 1947
Deputy Speaker	Hikmat al-Hakim	Independent	8 November 1947 – 19 November 1948
Deputy Speaker	Lutfi al-Haffar	National Party	20 November 1948 – 30 March 1949
Deputy Speaker	Muhammad Nuri al-Futayh		20 November 1948 – 30 March 1949
Secretary	Muhammad Suleiman al-Ahmad	National Party	27 September 1947 – 30 March 1949
Secretary	Abd al-Salam al-Ajili		27 September – 7 November 1947
Secretary	Anwar Ibrahim Qater		8 November 1947 – 30 March 1949
Secretary	Abd al-Salam Haydar		20 November 1948 – 30 March 1949
Overseer	Ahmad Qanbar	People's Party	27 September – 7 November 1947
Overseer	Abd al-Qadir Rahmu		27 September 1947 – 30 March 1949
Overseer	Fakhri al-Baroudi	Independent	27 September 1947 – 30 March 1949
Overseer	Najdat al-Najjari	National Party	8 November 1947 – 29 November 1948
Overseer	Adil al-Ajlani		20 November 1948 – 30 March 1949

== Elections of the Bureau ==
=== 27 September 1947 ===
The Assembly elected its Bureau at its first sitting on 27 September 1947, with 125 deputies present. Fares al-Khoury was elected speaker with 107 votes, against 11 blank ballots. Muhammad al-Ayish and Hani al-Sibai were elected deputy speakers, with 84 and 65 votes respectively. Muhammad Suleiman al-Ahmad was elected secretary with 64 votes; the number of votes cast for the other candidate, Abd al-Salam al-Ajili, is not recorded. Ahmad Qanbar, Abd al-Qadir Rahmu, and Fakhri al-Baroudi were elected overseers, with 79, 71, and 63 votes respectively.

=== 8 November 1947 ===
Election of the Speaker
Candidate	Party	Votes	%
Fares al-Khoury	People's Party	96	94.12
Mustafa Barmada	People's Party	4	3.92
Muhammad al-Ayish	Independent	1	0.98
Faydi al-Atassi	People's Party	1	0.98
Total		102	100.00
Valid votes		102	91.89
Invalid/blank votes		9	8.11
Total votes		111	100.00
Registered voters/turnout		131	84.73

Election of the Deputy Speakers
Candidate	Party	First round		Second round	
Candidate	Party	Votes	%	Votes	%
Muhammad al-Ayish	Independent	69	62.73		
Nazim al-Qudsi (Withdrawn)	People's Party	56	50.91		
Zaki al-Khatib	Independent	41	37.27	50	48.54
Hikmat al-Hakim	Independent	34	30.91	53	51.46
Total		200	100.00	103	100.00
Valid votes		111	99.11	103	100.00
Invalid/blank votes		1	0.89	0	0.00
Total votes		112	100.00	103	100.00
Registered voters/turnout		131	85.50	131	78.63

Election of the Secretaries
Candidate	Party	First round		Second round	
Candidate	Party	Votes	%	Votes	%
Muhammad Suleiman al-Ahmad	National Party	62	53.91		
Abd al-Salam al-Ajili		55	47.83		
Anwar Ibrahim Qater		53	46.09	54	100.00
Jihad al-Hawwash		43	37.39		
Ahmad Faris al-Zoubi		10	8.70		
Total		223	100.00	54	100.00
Valid votes		115	100.00		
Invalid/blank votes		0	0.00		
Total votes		115	100.00		
Registered voters/turnout		131	87.79		

Election of the Overseers
Candidate	Party	Votes	%
Abd al-Qadir Rahmu		69	62.16
Fakhri al-Baroudi	Independent	67	60.36
Najdat al-Najjari	National Party	60	54.05
Ahmad Qanbar	People's Party	56	50.45
Isa al-Siryani	People's Party	31	27.93
Mustafa al-Dukhan		56	50.45
Total		339	100.00
Valid votes		111	96.52
Invalid/blank votes		4	3.48
Total votes		115	100.00
Registered voters/turnout		131	87.79

=== 20 November 1948 ===
Election of the Speaker
Candidate	Party	Votes	%
Fares al-Khoury	People's Party	92	92.93
Rushdi al-Kikhya	People's Party	3	3.03
Adil al-Ajlani		1	1.01
Lutfi al-Haffar	National Party	1	1.01
Muhammad Nuri al-Futayh		1	1.01
Farzat al-Mamluk		1	1.01
Total		99	100.00
Valid votes		99	88.39
Invalid/blank votes		13	11.61
Total votes		112	100.00
Registered voters/turnout		131	85.50

Election of the Deputy Speakers
Candidate	Party	First round		Second round	
Candidate	Party	Votes	%	Votes	%
Lutfi al-Haffar	National Party	60	53.57		
Rushdi al-Kikhya (Withdrawn)	People's Party	52	46.43		
Muhammad Nuri al-Futayh		49	43.75	65	65.00
Zaki al-Khatib	Independent	34	30.36	32	32.00
Total		195	100.00	97	100.00
Valid votes		112	98.25	100	90.09
Invalid/blank votes		2	1.75	11	9.91
Total votes		114	100.00	111	100.00
Registered voters/turnout		131	87.02	131	84.73

Election of the Secretaries
Candidate	Party	Votes	%
Muhammad Suleiman al-Ahmad	National Party	67	60.91
Abd al-Salam Haydar		62	56.36
Anwar Ibrahim Qater		44	40.00
Muhammad al-Mubarak	Muslim Brotherhood	32	29.09
Total		205	100.00
Valid votes		110	100.00
Invalid/blank votes		0	0.00
Total votes		110	100.00
Registered voters/turnout		131	83.97

Election of the Overseers
Candidate	Party	Votes	%
Fakhri al-Baroudi	Independent	64	57.66
Adil al-Ajlani		64	57.66
Abd al-Qadir Rahmu		63	56.76
Ahmad Qanbar	People's Party	46	41.44
Joseph Ilyan	People's Party	36	32.43
Isa al-Siryani	People's Party	36	32.43
Total		309	100.00
Valid votes		111	100.00
Invalid/blank votes		0	0.00
Total votes		111	100.00
Registered voters/turnout		131	84.73

== Committees ==
=== 1st Special Session ===
The Chamber's committees were elected for the first ordinary session on 30 September 1947. Deputies were divided into three parliamentary sections to elect the committee members. On 1 October, these committees elected their Bureaux as follows:

Committees	Burea		Party
Budget Committee	Chair	Nazim al-Qudsi	People's Party
Budget Committee	Vice-Chair	Hikmat al-Hiraki	Independent
Budget Committee	Rapporteur	Hani al-Sibai	People's Party
Constitution Committee	Chair	Mustafa Barmada	People's Party
Constitution Committee	Vice-Chair	Faydi al-Atassi	People's Party
Constitution Committee	Rapporteur	Munir al-Ajlani	Independent
Education Committee	Chair	Mahmoud al-Shaqfa	
Education Committee	Vice-Chair	Asaad Harun	National Party
Education Committee	Rapporteur	Muhammad al-Mubarak	Muslim Brotherhood
Financial Laws Committee	Chair	George Sahnawi	
Financial Laws Committee	Vice-Chair	Louis Handiyeh	
Financial Laws Committee	Rapporteur	Jamal Ali Adib	National Party
Foreign Affairs Committee	Chair	Nazim al-Qudsi	People's Party
Foreign Affairs Committee	Vice-Chair	Muhammad al-Sarraj	People's Party
Foreign Affairs Committee	Rapporteur	Jihad al-Hawwash	
Interior Committee	Chair	Munir al-Ajlani	Independent
Interior Committee	Vice-Chair	Nasib al-Bakri	People's Party
Interior Committee	Rapporteur	Ahmad Qanbar	People's Party
Judicial Committee	Chair	Mustafa Barmada	People's Party
Judicial Committee	Vice-Chair	Zaki al-Khatib	Independent
Judicial Committee	Rapporteur	Latif Ghanima	People's Party
National Defense Committee	Chair	Sami Kabbarah	Independent
National Defense Committee	Vice-Chair	Zaki al-Mudarris	
National Defense Committee	Rapporteur	Faysal al-Asali	Socialist Cooperation Party
National Economy Committee	Chair	Hikmat al-Hiraki	Independent
National Economy Committee	Vice-Chair	Hasan al-Jabiri	
National Economy Committee	Rapporteur	Musallam al-Haddad	People's Party
Petitions Committee	Chair	Fakhri al-Baroudi	Independent
Petitions Committee	Vice-Chair	Abd al-Hamid al-Dweidari	People's Party
Petitions Committee	Rapporteur	Muhammad al-Mubarak	Muslim Brotherhood

=== 1st–2nd Ordinary and 2nd–3rd Special Sessions ===
The Chamber's committees were elected for the first ordinary session on 9 November 1947. These committees also continued to operate during the second ordinary, second and third special sessions. On 18 and 19 November, these committees elected their Bureaux as follows:

Committees	Burea		Party
Budget Committee	Chair	Nazim al-Qudsi (until 6 Dec 1947)	People's Party
Budget Committee	Chair	Muhammad Nuri al-Futayh (from 6 Dec 1947)	
Budget Committee	Vice-Chair	Abd al-Rahman al-Azm	
Budget Committee	Rapporteur	Hani al-Sibai (until 6 Dec 1947)	People's Party
Budget Committee	Rapporteur	Abd al-Rahman al-Azm (from 6 Dec 1947)	
Constitution Committee	Chair	Hani al-Sibai	People's Party
Constitution Committee	Vice-Chair	Sabri al-Asali	National Party
Constitution Committee	Rapporteur	Muhammad al-Sarraj	People's Party
Education Committee	Chair		
Education Committee	Vice-Chair		
Education Committee	Rapporteur		
Endowments Committee (Bureau elected on 29 November 1947)	Chair	Maarouf al-Dawalibi	People's Party
Endowments Committee (Bureau elected on 29 November 1947)	Vice-Chair	Hikmat al-Hakim	
Endowments Committee (Bureau elected on 29 November 1947)	Rapporteur	Mahmoud al-Shaqfa	
Financial Laws Committee	Chair	Abdullah Fattal	People's Party
Financial Laws Committee	Vice-Chair	Habib Kahala	
Financial Laws Committee	Rapporteur	Maarouf al-Dawalibi	People's Party
Foreign Affairs Committee	Chair	Adnan al-Atassi	People's Party
Foreign Affairs Committee	Vice-Chair		
Foreign Affairs Committee	Rapporteur	Abd al-Salam al-Ajili	
Interior Committee	Chair	Nasib al-Bakri	People's Party
Interior Committee	Vice-Chair	Anwar Ibrahim Qater	
Interior Committee	Rapporteur	Abd al-Salam al-Ajili	
Judicial Committee	Chair	Mustafa Barmada	People's Party
Judicial Committee	Vice-Chair	Zaki al-Khatib	Independent
Judicial Committee	Rapporteur	Latif Ghanima	People's Party
National Defense Committee (Bureau elected on 24 November 1947)	Chair	Fakhri al-Baroudi	Independent
National Defense Committee (Bureau elected on 24 November 1947)	Vice-Chair	Zaki al-Mudarris	
National Defense Committee (Bureau elected on 24 November 1947)	Rapporteur	Muhammad Khayr al-Hariri	National Party
National Economy Committee	Chair	Nuri al-Ibish	
National Economy Committee	Vice-Chair	Abd al-Aziz Hallaj	People's Party
National Economy Committee	Rapporteur	Akram al-Hourani	Youth Party
Petitions Committee	Chair	Muhammad al-Mubarak	Muslim Brotherhood
Petitions Committee	Vice-Chair	Abd al-Rahman al-Saegh	
Petitions Committee	Rapporteur	Kamal al-Kinj	
Tribal Committee	Chair		
Tribal Committee	Vice-Chair		
Tribal Committee	Rapporteur		

Additionally, two special committees were added during the 2nd ordinary session

Committees	Burea		Party
Personnel Committee (Bureau elected on 30 March 1948)	Chair	Habib Kahala	
Personnel Committee (Bureau elected on 30 March 1948)	Vice-Chair	Anwar Ibrahim Qater	
Personnel Committee (Bureau elected on 30 March 1948)	Rapporteur	Muhammad al-Mubarak	Muslim Brotherhood
Rules of Procedure Committee (Bureau elected on 10 May 1948)	Chair	Sabri al-Asali	National Party
Rules of Procedure Committee (Bureau elected on 10 May 1948)	Vice-Chair	Jamal Ali Adib	National Party
Rules of Procedure Committee (Bureau elected on 10 May 1948)	Rapporteur	Latif Ghanima	People's Party

=== 3rd Ordinary Session ===
Burea of the committees
Committees	Burea		Party
Budget Committee (Bureau elected on 29 November 1948)	Chair	Muhammad Nuri al-Futayh	
Budget Committee (Bureau elected on 29 November 1948)	Vice-Chair	Farzat al-Mamluk	
Budget Committee (Bureau elected on 29 November 1948)	Rapporteur	Abd al-Rahman al-Azm	
Constitution Committee	Chair		
Constitution Committee	Vice-Chair		
Constitution Committee	Rapporteur		
Education Committee (Bureau elected on 30 December 1948)	Chair	Mahmoud al-Shaqfa	
Education Committee (Bureau elected on 30 December 1948)	Vice-Chair	Fakhri al-Baroudi	Independent
Education Committee (Bureau elected on 30 December 1948)	Rapporteur	Kamal al-Kinj	
Endowments Committee (Bureau elected on 4 January 1949)	Chair	Mahmoud al-Shaqfa	
Endowments Committee (Bureau elected on 4 January 1949)	Vice-Chair	Ibrahim Tayfur	
Endowments Committee (Bureau elected on 4 January 1949)	Rapporteur	Adil al-Ajlani	
Financial Laws Committee (Bureau elected on 28 November 1948)	Chair	Hikmat al-Hakim	Independent
Financial Laws Committee (Bureau elected on 28 November 1948)	Vice-Chair	George Sahnawi	
Financial Laws Committee (Bureau elected on 28 November 1948)	Rapporteur	Lutfi al-Hajj Husayn	
Foreign Affairs Committee	Chair		
Foreign Affairs Committee	Vice-Chair		
Foreign Affairs Committee	Rapporteur		
Interior Committee (Bureau elected on 29 November 1948)	Chair	Sabri al-Asali	National Party
Interior Committee (Bureau elected on 29 November 1948)	Vice-Chair	Ahmad Ali Kamil	Independent
Interior Committee (Bureau elected on 29 November 1948)	Rapporteur	Abd al-Salam al-Ajili	
Judicial Committee (Bureau elected on 30 November 1948)	Chair	Sabri al-Asali	National Party
Judicial Committee (Bureau elected on 30 November 1948)	Vice-Chair	Farzat al-Mamluk	
Judicial Committee (Bureau elected on 30 November 1948)	Rapporteur	Abd al-Salam Haydar	
National Defense Committee (Bureau elected on 29 November 1948)	Chair	Fakhri al-Baroudi	Independent
National Defense Committee (Bureau elected on 29 November 1948)	Vice-Chair	Kamal al-Kinj	
National Defense Committee (Bureau elected on 29 November 1948)	Rapporteur	Jamal Ali Adib	National Party
National Economy Committee (Bureau elected on 28 December 1948)	Chair	Ahmad al-Sharabati	Independent
National Economy Committee (Bureau elected on 28 December 1948)	Vice-Chair	Hasan al-Jabiri	
National Economy Committee (Bureau elected on 28 December 1948)	Rapporteur	Nadim Shuman	
Petitions Committee	Chair		
Petitions Committee	Vice-Chair		
Petitions Committee	Rapporteur		
Tribal Committee	Chair		
Tribal Committee	Vice-Chair		
Tribal Committee	Rapporteur		

Additionally, two new committees were added during the 3rd ordinary session

Committees	Burea		Party
Health and Social Affairs Committee (Bureau elected on 27 December 1948)	Chair	Hikmat al-Hakim	Independent
Health and Social Affairs Committee (Bureau elected on 27 December 1948)	Vice-Chair	Habib Kahala	
Health and Social Affairs Committee (Bureau elected on 27 December 1948)	Rapporteur	Abd al-Salam al-Ajili	

== Major legislations and actions ==
The parliament undertook several important legislative and political actions:

- Rejection of electoral laws based on sectarian representation, affirming national representation
- Rejection of the Hashemite "Greater Syria" project
- Constitutional amendment allowing the re-election of President Shukri al-Quwatli (March–April 1948)
- Support for Arab efforts in Mandatory Palestine and encouragement of volunteers for the Arab Liberation Army

The chamber also passed several laws, including:

- Rent law, issued on 28 April 1947
- Law abolishing subsistence courts, issued on 18 May 1947
- Commercial Information Law, issued in 1947
- Agricultural Protection Law, issued in 1947

== Impact of the 1948 war ==
The 1948 Arab–Israeli War had a major impact on Syrian political life. Military defeat exposed weaknesses in the Syrian army and led to the resignation of Defence Minister Ahmad al-Sharabati, resignation of the government of Jamil Mardam Bey on December 1948, and the formation of a new government under Khalid al-Azm.

Political tensions increased further when the government announced its willingness to enter armistice negotiations with Israel.

== Political crisis and coup ==
On 18 January 1949, the Chamber declared its opposition to the Trans-Arabian Pipeline (Tapline) agreement with the United States, citing concerns over national sovereignty.

Amid rising political instability, on 30 March 1949, Husni al-Za'im carried out Syria's first military coup. Shortly thereafter the constitution was suspended, parliament was dissolved, and political parties were banned.

This marked the end of Syria's first post-independence parliamentary period and the beginning of an era of military coups in Syria that would last for about 20 years.
