= First Saadallah al-Jabiri government =

1943–1944 Syrian government

- 29th government of the Syrian Republic

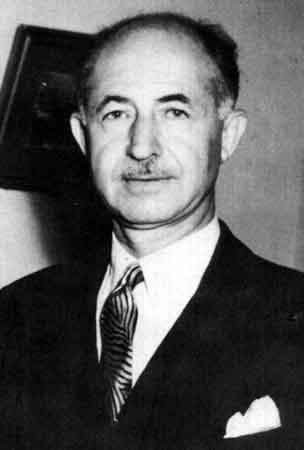
- Date formed: 19 August 1943
- Date dissolved: 14 October 1944

People and organisations
- President: Shukri al-Quwatli
- General Delegate: Jean Helleu; Yves Chataigneau; Paul Beynet
- Prime Minister: Saadallah al-Jabiri
- No. of ministers: 8
- Member parties: ▌National Bloc; ▌Independent

History
- Outgoing election: 1943
- Legislature term: 3rd Chamber of Deputies
- Predecessor: A. al-Ayyubi II
- Successor: al-Khoury I

The First Saadallah al-Jabiri government was the twenty-ninth government in the history of modern Syria and the fourteenth administration of the First Syrian Republic. Formed on 19 August 1943, it was the first government to serve under President Shukri al-Quwatli and was composed largely of politicians affiliated with the National Bloc, which had secured a dominant position following the 1943 elections.

During its tenure, the Syrian government assumed control of a number of key public services previously administered jointly with the French authorities, including the railways, postal and telegraph services, and other civil institutions. The cabinet also governed during the period of the Bechamoun incident in neighboring Lebanon, when Lebanese president Bechara El Khoury and Prime Minister Riad Al Solh were arrested by the French authorities. Syria expressed solidarity with Lebanon throughout the crisis, which became a significant moment in the struggle for independence in both countries. The government resigned on 14 October 1944 as a result of escalating disagreements between Prime Minister Saadallah al-Jabiri and Interior Minister Lutfi al-Haffar

== Composition ==
Portfolio	Minister	Took office	Left office	Party
Prime Minister	Saadallah al-Jabiri	19 August 1943	14 October 1944	National Bloc
Minister of Foreign Affairs	Jamil Mardam Bey	19 August 1943	14 October 1944	National Bloc
Minister of Interior	Lutfi al-Haffar	19 August 1943	14 October 1944	National Bloc
Minister of National Defense	Nasuhi al-Bukhari	19 August 1943	14 October 1944	Independent
Minister of Education	Nasuhi al-Bukhari	19 August 1943	14 October 1944	Independent
Minister of Finance	Khalid al-Azm	19 August 1943	14 October 1944	Independent
Minister of Public Works	Mazhar Raslan	19 August 1943	14 October 1944	National Bloc
Minister of Provisions and Supply	Mazhar Raslan	19 August 1943	14 October 1944	National Bloc
Minister of Justice	Abd al-Rahman al-Kayyali	19 August 1943	14 October 1944	National Bloc
Minister of Agriculture and Trade	Tawfiq Shamia	19 August 1943	14 October 1944	National Bloc

== See also ==
- Council of Ministers (Syria)
- List of Syrian governments
- Government ministries of Syria
- List of prime ministers of Syria
