= Lutfi al-Haffar government =

1939 Syrian government

- 21st government of the Syrian Republic

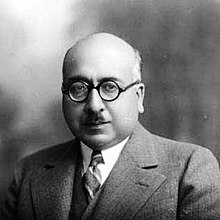
- Date formed: 23 February 1939
- Date dissolved: 5 April 1939

People and organisations
- President: Hashim al-Atassi
- High Commissioner: Gabriel Puaux
- Prime Minister: Lutfi al-Haffar
- No. of ministers: 5
- Member parties: ▌National Bloc; ▌Independent
- Status in legislature: Majority government

History
- Legislature term: 2nd Chamber of Deputies
- Predecessor: Mardam Bey I
- Successor: al-Bukhari

The Lutfi al-Haffar government was the twenty-first government in the history of modern Syria, serving from 23 February 1939 until its resignation in March 1939. Formed by decrees numbered 170 to 177 and published in the Official Gazette of the Syrian Republic, it was the sixth government of the First Syrian Republic. The government submitted its resignation on 14 March 1939 in response to the French authorities' position regarding the ratification and implementation of the Franco–Syrian Treaty of 1936, and its resignation was formally accepted by decree on 5 April 1939.

The government was established as a coalition between members of the National Bloc and independent politicians in an effort to contain the growing unrest associated with the 1939 protests. However, the continued expansion of demonstrations and public opposition to French policy undermined its position, leading to its resignation less than three weeks after taking office, making it one of the shortest-lived governments of the First Syrian Republic.

== Composition ==
Portfolio	Minister	Took office	Left office	Party
Prime Minister	Lutfi al-Haffar	23 February 1939	5 April 1939	National Bloc
Minister of Education	Lutfi al-Haffar (acting)	23 February 1939	5 April 1939	National Bloc
Minister of Interior	Mazhar Raslan	23 February 1939	5 April 1939	National Bloc
Minister of Defense	Mazhar Raslan (acting)	23 February 1939	5 April 1939	National Bloc
Minister of Finance	Fayez al-Khoury	23 February 1939	5 April 1939	National Bloc
Minister of Foreign Affairs	Fayez al-Khoury (acting)	23 February 1939	5 April 1939	National Bloc
Minister of Justice	Nasib al-Bakri	23 February 1939	5 April 1939	National Bloc
Minister of National Economy	Selim Janbart	23 February 1939	5 April 1939	Independent

== See also ==
- Council of Ministers (Syria)
- List of Syrian governments
- Government ministries of Syria
- List of prime ministers of Syria
