= Darem Tabbaa =

Syrian politician

HE, Dr, Prof Darem Tabbaa
- دارم الطباع

Minister of Education
- In office 30 August 2020 – 8 August 2023
- President: Bashar al-Assad
- Prime Minister: Hussein Arnous
- Preceded by: Imad al-Azab
- Succeeded by: Muhammad Amer Mardini

Personal details
- Born: 1958 (age 67–68) Damascus, Damascus Governorate, Second Syrian Republic
- Children: 5
- Education: University of Leipzig; University of Göttingen
- Profession: University Professor, Politician, Scientist, Civil servant

Darem Tabbaa (Arabic: دارم الطباع) (born 1958) is a Syrian veterinarian and politician. He was Education Minister from August 2020 until August 2023.

== Education ==
He graduated from Al Baath University as a veterinarian in 1981. He obtained a PhD in virology, epidemiology and public health in veterinary medicine from the University of Leipzig in 1988. He then earned a second PhD in tropical and subtropical animal hygiene from the University of Göttingen in 1998.

== Political career ==
He began working as an expert at the Athens World Health Organization (WHO) Center for Health and Environmental Science Education in the 1990s. From 2015 to 2019 he was Director of the National Center for Educational Curriculum Development. He was later named Assistant Minister of Education.

== Academic career ==
He has been a college dean, and has run a number of international Syrian projects. After working at the central veterinary laboratory in Damascus, he held veterinary teaching positions in the 1980s and 1990s in Syria, and also research jobs. In 1989, he became a moderator for project planning with the German Technical Cooperation Agency (GIZ). He became a member at the executive board of the international society of animal hygiene in 1990. In 1991, he joined the editing board of the scientific journal of Al Baath University. He became director of the project for animal protection in Syria with the Society for the Protection of Animals Abroad in 1993. He has been a dean of veterinary medicine in Syria from 2005 to 2007.
