= Bahij al-Khatib government =

1939–1941 Syrian government

- 23rd government of the Syrian Republic

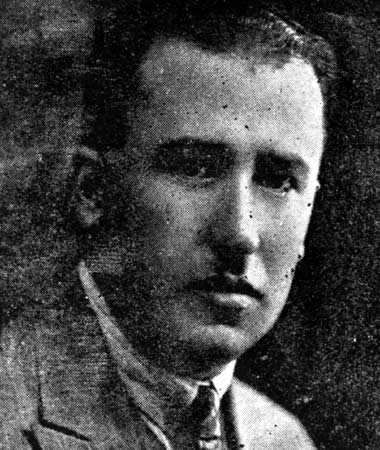
- Date formed: 8 July 1939
- Date dissolved: 1 April 1941

People and organisations
- President: Bahij al-Khatib
- High Commissioner: Gabriel Puaux; Jean Chiappe; Henri Dentz
- Prime Minister: Bahij al-Khatib
- No. of ministers: 6
- Member party: ▌Independent

History
- Legislature term: –
- Predecessor: al-Bukhari
- Successor: K. al-Azm I

The Bahij al-Khatib government, also known as the Council of Directors, was the eighth government of the First Syrian Republic, serving from 8 July 1939 until 1 April 1941. It was established following the suspension of parliamentary life, the resignation of President Hashim al-Atassi, and the French High Commissioner's decision to suspend the constitution amid the political unrest of 1939 and the deteriorating international situation preceding the Second World War. The government consisted of senior civil servants and technocrats with no formal party affiliations.

The government became known as the “Government of Directors” because it was composed primarily of directors-general of government ministries, with Bahij al-Khatib, the Director-General of the Ministry of Interior, serving simultaneously as head of government and head of state. Functioning largely as a caretaker administration during the suspension of constitutional rule, the government sought to maintain administrative continuity while restricting political activity. During its tenure, it cooperated with the Vichy French authorities during the Second World War and prohibited government employees from engaging in partisan politics. Its period in office also witnessed the assassination of Abd al-Rahman Shahbandar. The government came to an end following the defeat of Vichy forces in the Levant and the advance of the Free French Forces under Charles de Gaulle and British troops into Syria in 1941.

== Composition ==
Portfolio	Minister	Took office	Left office	Party
Prime Minister	Bahij al-Khatib	8 July 1939	1 April 1941	Independent
Director-General of Interior	Bahij al-Khatib	8 July 1939	1 April 1941	Independent
Director-General of Justice	Khalil Rif'at	8 July 1939	1 April 1941	Independent
Director-General of Education	Abd al-Latif al-Shatti	8 July 1939	1 April 1941	Independent
Director-General of Finance	Husni al-Bitar	8 July 1939	1 April 1941	Independent
Director-General of National Economy	Yusuf Ata-Allah	8 July 1939	1 April 1941	Independent

== See also ==
- Council of Ministers (Syria)
- List of Syrian governments
- Government ministries of Syria
- List of prime ministers of Syria
