= Muhammad Amer Mardini =

Minister of Education
- In office August 27, 2014 – June 22, 2016
- President: Bashar al-Assad
- Prime Minister: Wael al-Halqi
- Preceded by: Saleh al-Rashed
- Succeeded by: Hazwan al-Wuz
- In office August 9, 2023 – December 8, 2024
- President: Bashar al-Assad
- Prime Minister: Mohammad Ghazi al-Jalali; Hussein Arnous
- Preceded by: Ali Saad
- Succeeded by: Nazir al-Qadri (Syrian Transitional Government)

Personal details
- Education: Humboldt University
- Profession: Professor; Rector

Dr. Muhammad Amer Mardini is a Syrian academic and politician, who served in the final government of Ba'athist Syria as the Minister of Education.

== Biography ==
Muhammad Amer Mardini was born in Damascus in 1959. He earned a PhD in pharmaceutical quality control from Humboldt University in East Germany in 1988. He was a professor of pharmaceutics at al-Andalus University and the University of Damascus. At the time of his second appointment to government he was the rector of al-Andalus University.

=== al-Halqi government ===
Mardini was named the minister of education on August 27, 2014, in the Second Wael al-Halqi government. During this time Mardini and Bashar al-Assad issued reforms to B.A. and M.A. programs. He also worked to improve cooperation between Syrian and Iranian medical universities. Mardini, along with the rest of the Syrian government, would be placed under sanctions due to the violent suppression of the Syrian people during the Syrian Civil War

=== Arnous and al-Jalali governments ===
On August 8, 2023, Syrian President Bashar al-Assad issued Decree No. 206 for 2023 which again named Mardini the minister of education. He was sworn in on August 9 by Assad before Hussein Arnous.
