= 2nd Chamber of Deputies of Syria =

Legislative term of Syria's parliament from 1936 to 1939

2nd Chamber of Deputies
←	1st	3rd	→

Overview
- Legislative body: Chamber of Deputies
- Jurisdiction: Syria
- Meeting place: Chamber of Deputies Building, Damascus
- Term: 21 December 1936 – 8 July 1939
- Election: 1936; 1937 (Latakia and Jabal Druze Governorates)
- Government: Mardam Bey I (until 23 February 1936); al-Haffar (23 February – 5 April 1939); al-Bukhari (5 April – 15 May 1939)
- Members: 106 (Note: 85 until 1937.)
- Speaker: Fares al-Khoury (National Bloc)

Sessions
- 1st: 21–31 December 1936
- 2nd: 17 April – 31 May 1937
- 3rd: 19 October – 31 December 1937
- 4th: 19 October – 31 December 1937
- 5th: 19 November – 31 December 1938
- 6th: 21 March – 31 May 1939

Special sessions
- 1st: 3–10 January 1938
- 2nd: 3–17 January 1939

The Second Chamber of Deputies (Arabic: مجلس النواب للدور الاشتراعي الثاني, romanized: Majlis al-Nuwwāb lil-dawr al-ishtirāʻī al-thānī) was the second parliament of the Syrian Republic. It was composed following the 1936 parliamentary election. The 1937 parliamentary election took place in Latakia and Suwayda after the Alawite State and Jabal Druze State rejoined Syria.

The chamber convened on 21 December 1936 and was dissolved by the French High Commissioner on 8 July 1939. It was dominated by the National Bloc and independent politicians. It played a central role in the ratification of the 1936 Franco-Syrian Treaty with France.

During its first session, the chamber elected its leadership, accepted the resignation of President Muhammad Ali al-Abid, elected Hashim al-Atassi as President, and oversaw the formation of a government headed by Jamil Mardam Bey.

== Background ==
The elections of 1936 followed a period of sustained nationalist unrest, including a 60-day general strike in Damascus and other Syrian cities. These events led to negotiations between Syrian nationalist leaders, headed by Hashim al-Atassi, and the French High Commissioner.

An agreement was reached in March 1936 recognizing Syrian unity and promising independence, to be formalized in a treaty negotiated in Paris by a Syrian delegation including al-Atassi, Fares al-Khoury, Jamil Mardam Bey, and Saadallah al-Jabiri.

Following the delegation's return, parliamentary elections were held in December 1936 to ratify the treaty and establish a new government.

== Bureau ==
Position	Name	Party	Tenure
Speaker	Fares al-Khoury	National Bloc	21 December 1936 – 8 July 1939
Deputy Speaker	Muhammad Nuri al-Futayh	National Bloc	21 December 1936 – 8 July 1939
Deputy Speaker	Lutfi al-Haffar	National Bloc	21 December 1936 – 8 July 1939
Deputy Speaker	Shukri al-Quwatli	National Bloc	19 November 1938 – 8 July 1939
Secretary	Tawfiq al-Shishakli		21 December 1936 – 8 July 1939
Secretary	Nazim al-Qudsi	National Bloc	21 December 1936 – 8 July 1939
Overseer	Fakhri al-Baroudi	National Bloc	21 December 1936 – 8 July 1939
Overseer	Jamil Ibrahim Pasha	National Bloc	21 December 1936 – 8 July 1939
Overseer	George Sahnawi		21 December 1936 – 8 July 1939

== Major legislations and actions ==
The parliament undertook several significant legislative and political actions:

- General amnesty allowing the return of political exiles, including Sultan al-Atrash and Abd al-Rahman Shahbandar
- Reintegration of regions such as Suwayda Governorate and the coastal territories (today's Latakia and Tartus Governorates into the Syrian state on 9 September and 3 December 1936 respectively
- Ratification of the Franco-Syrian Treaty of Independence on 22 December 1936, which was subsequently promulgated into law
- Retirement law, adopted on 1 June 1937
- Supreme Economic Council law, adopted on 18 May 1938

== Crisis over Alexandretta ==
The status of the Sanjak of Alexandretta became a central political issue. Despite indications that the majority of the population favored remaining part of Syria, Turkey pressed territorial claims.

France ultimately ceded the territory to Turkey in 1939, leading to widespread protests in Syria and strong opposition within parliament.

== Dissolution ==
On 7 July 1939, President Hashim al-Atassi resigned in protest against French policies, particularly regarding Alexandretta.

On 8 July 1939, the French High Commissioner suspended the constitution, removed the president, and dissolved parliament indefinitely. This marked the beginning of a period of direct French rule, often referred to as the "High Commissioner period".

The dissolution of parliament effectively ended constitutional life in Syria. Shortly thereafter France and Turkey signed a border agreement on 21 July 1939, World War II began in September 1939, and political life in Syria was severely restricted
