= First Jamil Mardam Bey government =

1936–1939 Syrian government

- 20th government of the Syrian Republic

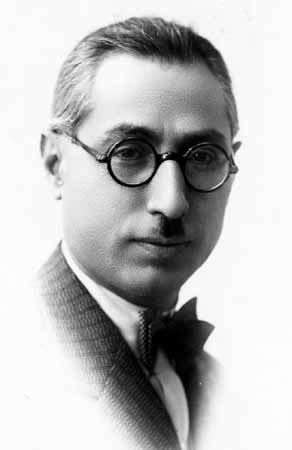
- Date formed: 21 December 1936
- Date dissolved: 23 February 1939

People and organisations
- President: Hashim al-Atassi
- High Commissioner: Damien de Martel (until 1939); Gabriel Puaux (from 1939)
- Prime Minister: Jamil Mardam Bey
- No. of ministers: 4 (until 1938); 5 (from 1938)
- Member party: ▌National Bloc
- Status in legislature: Majority government

History
- Election: 1936
- Legislature term: 2nd Chamber of Deputies
- Predecessor: A. al-Ayyubi I
- Successor: al-Haffar

The First Jamil Mardam Bey government was the twentieth government in the history of modern Syria, serving from 21 December 1936 until its resignation was accepted on 23 February 1939. Formed by decrees numbered 1047 to 1051 and published in the Official Gazette of the Syrian Republic, it was the fifth government of the First Syrian Republic and the first to serve under President Hashim al-Atassi. It was also the first Syrian government composed entirely of members of the National Bloc.

The government remained in office for more than two years, making it one of the longest-serving administrations of the First Republic. During its tenure, the Syrian national anthem was officially adopted, and the Franco–Syrian Treaty of 1936 was ratified by Syrian authorities, although France ultimately declined to implement its provisions. The final period of the government's tenure was dominated by the controversy surrounding the separation of the Sanjak of Alexandretta and the granting of autonomous status to the territory. Growing public dissatisfaction and the protests of 1939 prompted the government's resignation on 18 February 1939, marking the beginning of a period of political instability and successive governmental crises.

On 22 March 1938, Shukri al-Quwatli resigned in protest against the Prime Minister's unilateral decision-making regarding the state's financial policies.

== Composition ==
Portfolio	Minister	Took office	Left office	Party
Prime Minister	Jamil Mardam Bey	21 December 1936	23 February 1939	National Bloc
Minister of National Economy	Jamil Mardam Bey	21 December 1936	26 July 1938	National Bloc
Minister of National Economy	Fayez al-Khoury	26 July 1938	23 February 1939	National Bloc
Minister of Interior	Saadallah al-Jabiri	21 December 1936	23 February 1939	National Bloc
Minister of Foreign Affairs	Saadallah al-Jabiri	21 December 1936	23 February 1939	National Bloc
Minister of Finance	Shukri al-Quwatli	21 December 1936	22 March 1938	National Bloc
Minister of Finance	Lutfi al-Haffar	22 March 1938	23 February 1939	National Bloc
Minister of Defense	Shukri al-Quwatli	21 December 1936	22 March 1938	National Bloc
Minister of Defense	Jamil Mardam Bey	22 March 1938	23 February 1939	National Bloc
Minister of Justice	Abd al-Rahman al-Kayyali	21 December 1936	23 February 1939	National Bloc
Minister of Education	Abd al-Rahman al-Kayyali	21 December 1936	23 February 1939	National Bloc

== See also ==
- Council of Ministers (Syria)
- List of Syrian governments
- Government ministries of Syria
- List of prime ministers of Syria
