= Ali Saad (minister) =

Syrian politician

Ali Saad علي سعد

Minister of Education
- In office 10 September 2003 – 29 March 2011
- President: Bashar al-Assad
- Prime Minister: Muhammad Naji al-Otari
- Succeeded by: Saleh al-Rashed

Personal details
- Born: 1953 (age 72–73) Damascus, Syria
- Party: Syrian Regional Branch of the Arab Socialist Ba'ath Party

Ali Saad (Arabic: علي سعد) (born 1953) is a former Minister of Education in Syria, an Elected Member of the Central Committee, and a member of the Baath Party. He holds a Ph.D. degree in psychology from the University of Bucharest.
