= Difa =

Difa ديفة Difeh
- Village
- Location in Syria
- Coordinates: 35°31′10″N 35°59′8″E
- Country: Syria
- Governorate: Latakia
- District: Al-Haffah
- Subdistrict: Muzayraa

Population (2004)
  - Total: 403
- Time zone: UTC+2 (EET)
  - Summer (DST): UTC+3 (EEST)

Difa (Arabic: ديفة, also spelled Difeh) is a village in northwestern Syria administratively part of the Muzayraa Subdistrict of the al-Haffah District, located east of Latakia. According to the Syria Central Bureau of Statistics (CBS), Difa had a population of 403 in the 2004 census. Its inhabitants are predominantly Alawites. Difa is the birthplace of the well-known poet Badawi al-Jabal.

== Bibliography ==
- Meismani, Julie Scott (1998), Encyclopedia of Arabic Literature, vol. 1, Taylor & Francis, ISBN 9780415185714
- Moubayed, Sami M. (2006), Steel & Silk: Men and Women who Shaped Syria 1900-2000, Cune Press, ISBN 9781885942401
