= Badawi al-Jabal =

Syrian poet

Badawi al-Jabal بدوي الجبل
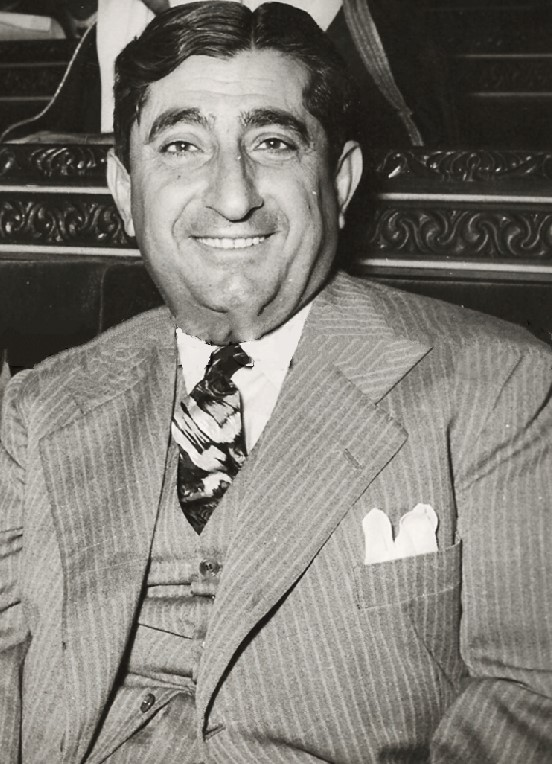
- Badawi al-Jabal, 1954
- Born: Muhammad Sulayman al-Ahmad; 1903; Difa, Syria
- Died: August 19, 1981 (aged 77–78); Syria
- Occupations: Poet, writer
- Writing career
- Pen name: Badawi al-Jabal

Muhammad Sulayman al-Ahmad (1903– August 19, 1981) (Arabic: محمد سليمان الأحمد), better known by his pen name Badawi al-Jabal (Arabic: بدوي الجبل), was a Syrian poet known for his work in the neo-classical Arabic form. According to anthologist Salma Khadra Jayyusi, Badawi was "one of the greatest poets of the old school".

== Early life ==
Badawi was born in 1903 to an Alawite family in the village of Difa, near al-Haffa, in the Latakia District. His father, Sheikh Sulayman al-Ahmad, was a prominent Alawite imam from the Kalbiyya tribal confederation, and also served in the Damascus-based Arab Academy of Language in 1919. Badawi developed an early understanding of the Qur'an and classic Arabic poems from his father.

Following the French occupation of Syria in the aftermath of World War I, Badawi joined the Al-Ali Revolt, which centered in the Syrian coastal mountain areas. He fought alongside Saleh al-Ali's men, committing acts of sabotage against French forces. He also served as an intermediary between al-Ali and the King of Syria, Faisal I. Badawi was incarcerated by the French Mandatory authorities for many months in 1920–21 for his involvement in Syrian resistance activities, but was ultimately released because of his young age.

Later, he participated in the 1925 Great Syrian Revolt, personally heading parties of rebels in nighttime raids on French Military checkpoints. Consequently, the French put a bounty on him and he left Syria for Iraq. There, he worked as a teacher of Arabic literature in a Baghdad high school. In 1936, he made his way back to Syria where he studied law at the University of Damascus for a short time before being arrested by the authorities for his earlier anti-French activities. After serving one year of incarceration he once again moved to Baghdad to resume his teaching career. He became a professor of Arabic at the University of Baghdad. During his time in Iraq, he reportedly supported Rashid Ali's attempts to free Iraq of British influence in 1941.

== Political career ==
Badawi joined the National Bloc upon his return to Syria in 1943. The party opposed French rule and lobbied for Syria's unity and independence. That same year, he was voted into the Parliament of Syria as a member of the National Bloc. Following Syria's independence in 1946, Badawi won parliamentary elections in 1947 and 1949. He was instrumental in founding the National Party along with Shukri al-Quwatli and others, and served on its central committee. The party advocated for modernization and republicanism, arguing against any mergers with the Hashemite monarchies of Jordan and Iraq.

In reaction to the establishment of Israel in 1948 and its victory over Arab forces, Badawi blamed the leadership of the Arab countries for leading their people to defeat. A warrant for Badawi's arrest was issued when Husni al-Zaim, a military officer, toppled the government in March 1949. Badawi subsequently fled to Lebanon, before returning later that year after al-Zaim was assassinated. In December he became the chief publicist of the government under President Hashim al-Atassi. During his time in the post, he penned articles commending the new leadership.

The Atassi administration was short-lived as Officer Adib al-Shishakli overthrew the government in 1951. Between that time and Shishakli's ousting in 1954, Badawi actively opposed military rule. In March 1954, he was appointed Health Minister in Prime Minister Sabri al-Asali's cabinet under Atassi's reinstated presidency, serving the post until June. He was once again appointed the position in Fares al-Khoury's government in October, serving until February 1955.

Badawi later served in Said al-Ghazzi's cabinet as Minister of State for Media Affairs between September 1955 – June 1956, during Quwatli's third presidency. Badawi was a fierce critic of socialism, particularly the way that the ideology was adopted by Egypt and Syria. He wrote that socialism was an "evil" system that merely served to concentrate power and wealth into the hands of the elite by seizing resources, denying individual freedom and justice to citizens and encouraging immorality in society. Moreover, he claimed socialism was an assault on religion and religious individuals. During his time in al-Ghazzi's cabinet, he publicly stated his opposition to Quwatli's closeness with the pan-Arabist and socialist president of Egypt, Gamal Abdel Nasser, and the Soviet Union.

When Syria and Egypt united to form the United Arab Republic in February 1958, Badawi lambasted the union for bringing an end to the democratic system in Syria. By that time, pan-Arabist feeling was becoming dominant in the country, and Badawi had entered into a self-imposed exile as a precaution against potential harassment by the authorities. He first moved to Lebanon, then to Turkey and Tunisia, before ending up in Switzerland, which Badawi referred to as his new "permanent residence". In 1962, months after the dissolution of the Syrian-Egyptian union in a Damascus-based coup that Badawi supported, he returned to Syria, but decided to stay out of politics. From then on, Badawi focused his energies on his poetry.

== Poetry ==
Early in his career, Badawi viewed the role of the poet as synonymous with that of the "public spokesman of the [sic] community", according to literature expert Reuven Snir. Thus, when he published his first diwan (collection of poems) in Sidon in 1925, it consisted mostly of traditional poems representative of the politically charged atmosphere of the times and the Syrian public's mood. He began publishing his poetry in magazines based in Beirut and Damascus in the early 1940s. His poems centered on romantic Arabic verse and criticism of the state of Syria's politics. It was during his time working with the Alif Ba'e magazine that he was given his pen name Badawi al-Jabal ("Bedouin from the Mountain") by the head of the magazine, Midhat Akkash.

His poetic style was classical Arabic prose, based on the Abbasid-era tradition. Although Badawi refused to introduce modern Arabic wording to his poetry, his work was influenced to a certain extent by his modern experience of exile, poverty and political activism. Thus, while his poems are generally considered to be representative of the conservative genre, his work went "much beyond the mere imitation of classical models", according to Stefan Sperl. In Badawi's view, the incorporation of shi'r hurr (free verse) into modern Arabic poetry is an unnecessary innovation, arguing that the classical Arabic form is a satisfactory means of expression in the modern day. He did not consider free verse to be poetry at all, but rather a completely different form of literature, insistent that eventually, Arabic poets would return to the classical tradition.

Sufi literary influences, particularly that of Ibn al-Farid, greatly influenced Badawi's later works. He believed that through exploring one's own heart, one could find "the beauty of his God, and sip [sic] the wine of His knowledge and love." Unlike most Arabic poets of his generation, Badawi's work remained firmly rooted in classical tradition. He belonged to the neoclassical school of Arabic poets, which included Ahmed Shawqi. According to Jayyusi, Badawi "surpassed all his neo-classical contemporaries ... by his ability to achieve a universality, to arrive at the poetic moment in which the factual and metaphysical merge." His poetry often expressed constant loneliness, unquenchable thirst and foreboding which reflected the real-time events of his life and the greater Arab population yet in nature, were abstract.

Badawi's poetry also reflected an extent of automatism as testified by a moment during one of his parliamentary campaigns in the 1950s when a crowd of supporters gathered around to hear him speak about his political goals. Instead of immediately speaking to the crowd, he locked himself in a study and penned a profanely mystical love poem called The Holy Flame, which he then read to the crowd.

== Bibliography ==
- Auden, W. H. (2005), "Al-Badawi, Jabal", in Alan Parker; Mark Willhardt (eds.), Who's Who in Twentieth Century World Poetry, Routledge, ISBN 9781134713769
- Jayyusi, Salma Khadra (1977), Trends and Movements in Modern Arabic Poetry, vol. 2, BRILL, ISBN 9789004049208
- Jayyusi, Salma Khadra (1987), Modern Arabic Poetry: An Anthology, Columbia University Press, ISBN 9780231052733
- Moubayed, Sami M. (2006), Steel & Silk: Men and Women who Shaped Syria 1900–2000, Cune Press, ISBN 9781885942401
- Seale, Patrick (1990), Asad: The Struggle for the Middle East, University of California Press, ISBN 9780520069763
- Snir, Reuven (1998), "Badawi al-Jabal (1907–1981)", in Julie Scott Meismani (ed.), Encyclopedia of Arabic Literature, vol. 1, Taylor & Francis, ISBN 9780415185714
- Sperl, Stefan (1996), Qasida poetry in Islamic Asia and Africa: Eulogy's Bounty, Meaning's Abundance, an Anthology, vol. 2, BRILL, ISBN 9789004103870
- Sulaiman, Khalid A. (1984), Palestine and Modern Arab Poetry, Zed Books, ISBN 9780862322380
