= Nasuhi al-Bukhari =

Syrian soldier and politician

- نصوحي البخاري
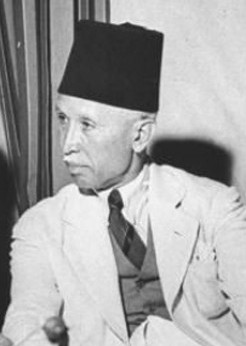
- Nasuhi al-Bukhari in 1943

Prime Minister of Syria
- In office 5 April 1939 – 8 July 1939
- President: Hashim al-Atassi
- Preceded by: Lutfi al-Haffar
- Succeeded by: Khalid al-Azm

Minister of Defence of Syria
- In office 5 April 1939 – 8 July 1939
- President: Hashim al-Atassi
- Preceded by: Mazhar Raslan
- Succeeded by: Abd al-Ghaffar al-Atrash

Personal details
- Born: 1881 Damascus, Ottoman Syria
- Died: 1 July 1961 (aged 79–80) Damascus, United Arab Republic
- Education: Ottoman Military Academy

Military service
- Allegiance: Ottoman Empire (1915–1918); Arab Kingdom of Syria (1919–1920)
- Rank: Colonel

Nasuhi al-Bukhari (Arabic: نصوحي البخاري) or Nasuh al-Boukhari (Arabic: نصوح البخاري; 1881 – 1 July 1961) was a Syrian soldier and politician who briefly served as Prime Minister of Syria in 1939.

== Career ==
=== Early career ===
Nasuhi al-Bukhari received his education at the Ottoman Military Academy in Istanbul. He served in the Ottoman Army until he was captured by the Allies during World War I. In 1916, after escaping his Siberian exile, he went back to Istanbul.

In July 1920 French Mandate of Syria was declared, and the country was divided into several independent states. In September 1920, Haqqi al-Azm was appointed governor of the State of Damascus, and in December he appointed Bukhari as minister of military affairs in his administration, which served until 1922. After the suppression of the Great Syrian Revolt in 1926, Ahmad Nami was appointed by the new French Commissioner, Henri de Jouvenel, to head a provisional council of ministers in the State of Syria, which comprised the former states of Damascus and Aleppo. Bukhari served as minister of agriculture in Ahmad Nami's cabinet until its resignation in February 1928.

=== Premiership ===
On 5 April 1939, during a cabinet crisis between the ruling National Bloc and the opposition, nationalist leader Hashim al-Atassi called on Bukhari to form a non-party government.

=== Later life ===
Between August 1943 and November 1944 Bukhari was minister of education and acting minister of defence in Saadallah al-Jabiri's cabinet. However, his subsequent advocacy of a Syrian Army with military draft proved electorally unpopular in Damascus. After losing his parliamentary seat in the 1947 elections, he retired from political life.

Political offices
Preceded by Lutfi al-Haffar	Prime Minister of Syria; 1939	Succeeded by Khalid al-Azm
