= Saleh al-Rashed =

Syrian scholar and politician (born 1964)

Saleh al-Rashed صالح الراشد
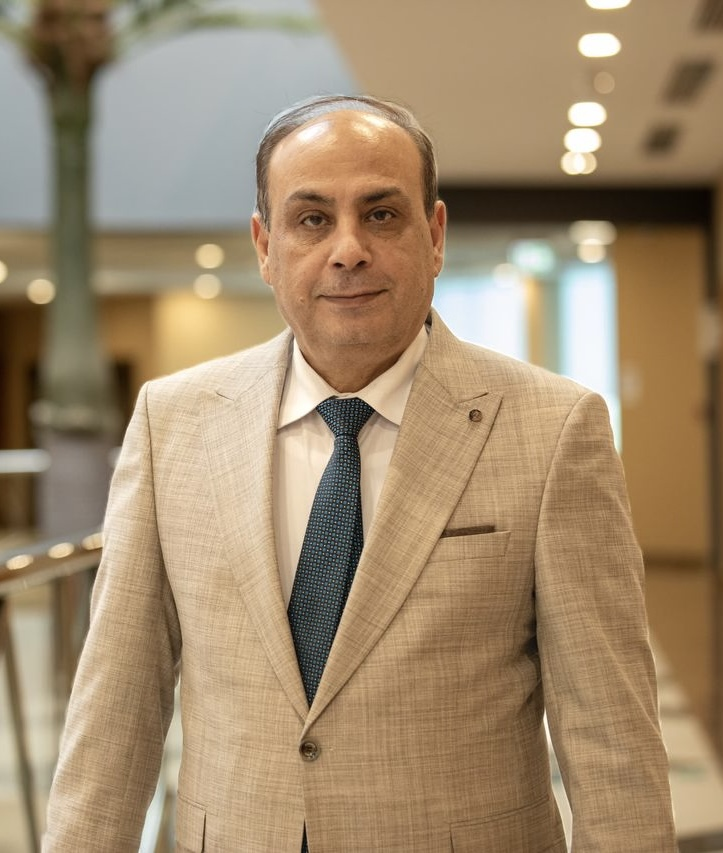

Associate professor
- In office 2000 – Until now

Personal details
- Born: 1964 (age 61–62) Aleppo Governorate, Syria
- Children: three
- Education: University of Aleppo
- Profession: Academics

Saleh al-Rashed (Arabic: صالح الراشد) is an associate professor specializing in political science and international relations, with over twenty years of academic experience in university teaching and scientific research. Throughout his academic career, he has worked at several Syrian, Arab, and international universities.

Al-Rashed earned his Ph.D. in political science from the Lebanese University in 2010. Since then, he has held academic positions. He currently serves as a faculty member at the University of Umm Al Quwain University in the United Arab Emirates, where he contributes to developing the academic program for the Political Science and International Relations Department and actively participates in preparing a new generation of specialists. He has also supervised numerous graduation projects addressing contemporary and advanced issues in political science and public policy, playing a key role in enhancing students' research and analytical skills.

== Early life, education and career ==
Al-Rashed was born in the Aleppo Governorate in 1964. He earned a bachelor's degree in political science, economics and management, and a postgraduate diploma in international relations from the University of Aleppo.

- During his time at the University of Aleppo:
  - 1995-2005: lecturer in multiple colleges and institutes: Faculty of History, Education, Civil Engineering and the Institute of Mechanical and medium business, engineering and secretarial
- 2007: Director of Education in Aleppo Governorate
- 2011-2012: Chairman of the National Committee for Education, Culture and Science in Syria UNESCO.
- 2011-2012: Served as the Minister of Education.
- 2015-2019: Faculty Member in the University of Modern sciences –Dubai.
- 2016-2019: Assistant Professor in the Canadian University Dubai.
- 2017-2019: Dean of College of Arts & Sciences in the University of Modern Sciences.
- 2020-2023: Head of International Relations Department at the Faculty of International Relations and Diplomacy at Al-Sham Private University.
- 2023–present Faculty Member at Umm Al Quwain University.

== Books ==
(2005) ALRashed, Saleh (2005) Syria and the Euro-Mediterranean Union (The Hardship of Neighborhood). Damascus: Dar Al-Sadeeq.

(2024) Introduction to International Relations. Sharjah: Al-Afaq Al-Ilmiyya Publishing and Distribution.

(2025) Political Science. Sharjah: Al-Afaq Al-Ilmiyya Publishing and Distribution.

== Journal articles ==
(2024)ALRashed, Saleh. "Media Policy and its Impact on Tourism: UAE as a Model." International Journal of Media and Mass Communication.

(2024) "The Impact of Digital Media on Social Issues in Palestine." International Journal of Media and Mass Communication.

(2024)"The Role of Documentaries in Wildlife Preservation at Dinder National Park." American Journal of Environmental Sciences.

(2025)"Contemporary International Variables and their Impact on the Structure of the International System." Damascus University Journal for Economic and Political Sciences.

(2025)"Navigating the Digital Landscape: Exploring Communication Challenges with Users on Spotify..."

== Conference participations ==
(July 2025) Co-author, "Digital and Technological Applications in Health Communication." 30th International Scientific Conference on Health Communication.

(2005) Participant, Mediterranean Training for Leaders "Coordinator Trainers National". Umm Qais, Jordan.

(2004) Participant, International Symposium "Environment and Combating Desertification". Venezuela.

(2004) Participant, Workshop on Mediterranean Cultural Dialogue. Amman, Jordan.

(2003–2005). Participant, Annual Symposium "Arab Youth and the Challenges of the Era". League of Arab States (Damascus/Doha).

== Professional roles ==
- Head, Syrian Delegation to the UNESCO General Conference (2011). Paris.
- Head, Syrian Delegation to the World Conference on International Youth Policies (2010). Mexico.
- Head, Syrian Delegation to the World Youth Festival (2013). Quito, Ecuador.

== See also ==
- Cabinet of Syria
