= Abd al-Rahman al-Kayyali =

Abd al-Rahman al-Kayyali عبد الرحمن الكيالي
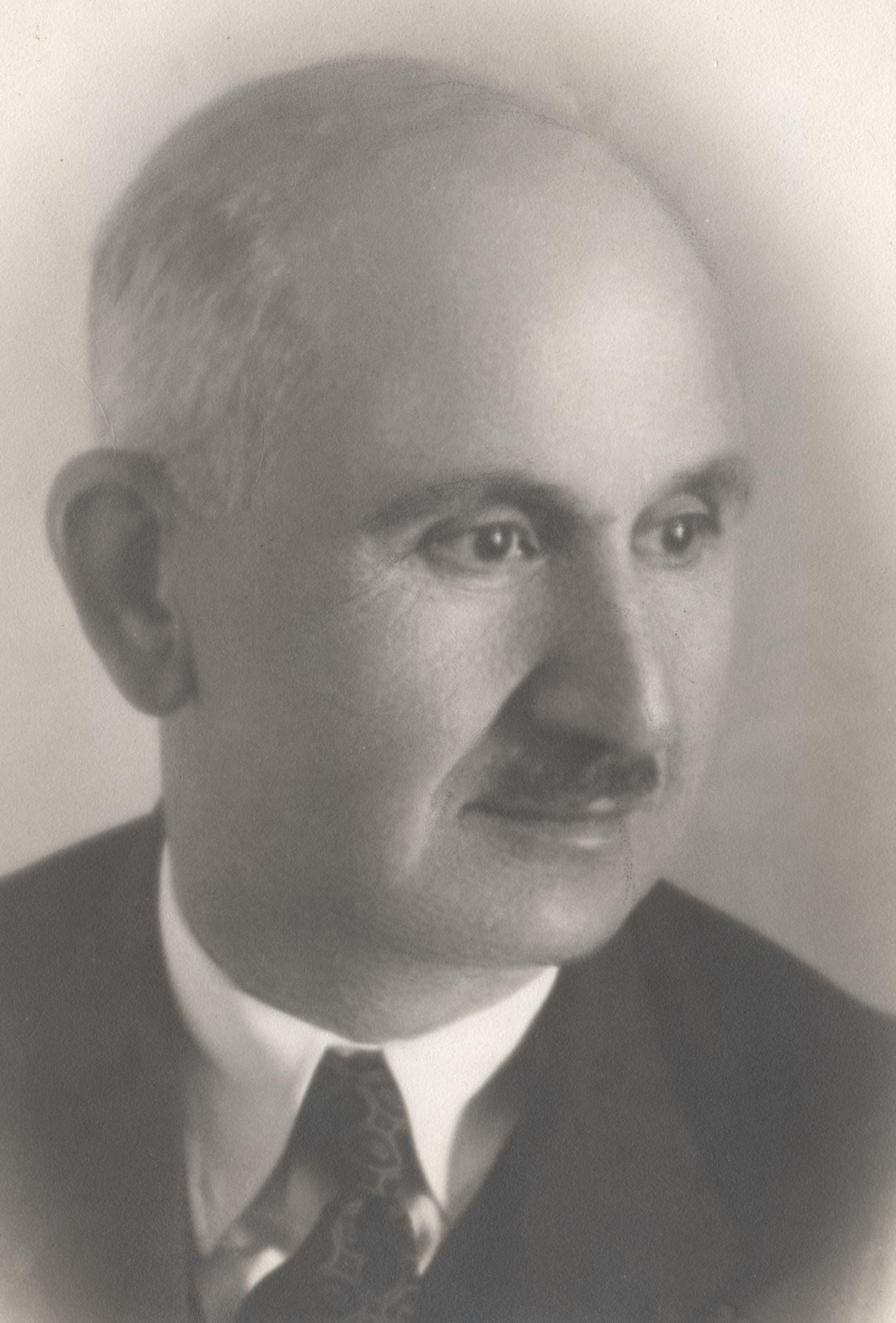

Minister of Justice and Education
- In office 21 December 1936 – 18 February 1939
- President: Hashim al-Atassi
- Preceded by: Said al-Ghazzi
- Succeeded by: Nasib al-Bakri
- In office 19 August 1943 – 5 April 1945
- President: Shukri al-Quwatli
- Preceded by: Faydi al-Atasi
- Succeeded by: Said al-Ghazzi

Personal details
- Born: 1887 Aleppo, Ottoman Syria
- Died: September 13, 1969 (aged 81–82) Aleppo, Syria

Abd al-Rahman al-Kayyali (Arabic: عبد الرحمن الكيالي; 1887 – 13 September 1969) was a physician from the city of Aleppo and member of the Syrian independence movement who served as the Minister of Justice and Education for two terms.

== Biography ==
Born in Aleppo, al-Kayyali studied medicine at the Lebanese American University and graduated in 1914. Upon the emergence of WWI, he served as a medic in the Ottoman Army in Al-Hamraa, Hama Governorate.

In 1919, al-Kayyali was among the founders of the Arab Club of Aleppo, a political salon and society that promoted Aleppine regionalism and Arab nationalism in Syria against the French rule during the Mandate for Syria and the Lebanon.

Later on, he joined the National Bloc, in which he became a member of Parliament in 1928, 1936 and 1943. In the meantime, he served as the Minister of Justice and Education during the premiership of Jamil Mardam Bey, Saadallah al-Jabiri and Faris al-Khoury, from 1936 to 1939 and from 1943 to 1945.

Al-Kayyali also served as a diplomat for Syria. After the formal independence of Syria following the Franco-Syrian Treaty of Independence in September 1936, he was appointed non-resident ambassador to the League of Nations by president Hashim al-Atassi, a position he quit after his nomination as a cabinet member in December 1936. From 1947 to 1949 he represented the Syrian Republic as a delegate to the United Nations General Assembly.

Al-Kayyali died on 13 September 1969.

== Legacy ==
As a representative of the Aleppan bourgeoisie and a nationalist activist, al-Kayyali built strong ties with leaders of Syria's first independence movement, including Ibrahim Hananu, leader of the so-called Hananu Revolt against French rule. Kayyali can be considered one of the most prestigious citizens of Aleppo of his time and a Western educated proponent of anti-colonial nationalist ideology.

One of al-Kayyali's grandsons, the dentist Mustafa Kayali (or Al-Kayyali), emerged as a prominent civil society activist during the Syrian revolution and was, according to media reports, among the authors of a document known as the "Code of Conduct for Syrian Coexistence" in 2017, endorsed by various Syrian community leaders.
