= Ahmad al-Sharabati =

Syrian politician (1909–1975)

Ahmad al-Sharabati (Arabic: أحمد الشرباتي; 1909 – 1975) was a Syrian politician and the defense minister of Syria between 1946 and 1948, serving in the post as Syria gained its independence from France and during the early days of the 1948 Arab-Israeli War.

== Early life ==
Sharabati was born in Damascus in 1909, during Ottoman rule. His father, Uthman al-Sharabati, was a well-established merchant and a financier of the nationalist resistance movement against French Mandatory rule, which began in 1920. Ahmad was an engineer by trade, obtaining his graduate degree from the Massachusetts Institute of Technology, after being a student at the American University of Beirut.

== Political career ==
=== French Mandatory rule ===
Sharabati returned to Damascus where he operated a tobacco plant and as a representative for General Motors. In 1933, he helped co-found the Arab nationalist and anti-colonial organization, the League of National Action (LNA). The LNA called for the liberation of Arab countries from French and British rule and for the post-colonial economic integration of the Arab world. He left the LNA in 1936 to join the most prominent independence movement in Mandatory Syria, the National Bloc.

Sharabati struck a particular alliance with the National Bloc's Damascus-based leaders, such as Shukri al-Quwatli and Jamil Mardam Bey. Sharabati ran for parliament as a representative of Damascus in 1943, winning the seat. He was appointed by Prime Minister Fares al-Khoury education and national economy minister in March 1945. A year later, Syria gained full independence from France and was appointed defense minister by Prime Minister Saadallah al-Jabiri, despite scant knowledge and experience in military affairs. Sharabati's ally, President Quwatli tasked him to establish the post-independent Syrian Army and was entrusted to win the favor of officers, which he was not able to do successfully.

== Bibliography ==
- Moubayed, Sami M. (2000), Damascus Between Democracy and Dictatorship, University Press of America, ISBN 9780761817444
- Moubayed, Sami M. (2006), Steel & Silk: Men and Women who shaped Syria 1900–2000, Cune Press, ISBN 978-1885942418
