= Ministry of Education (Syria) =

Government ministry of Syria

- وزارة التربية والتعليم

Agency overview
- Formed: 1920
- Jurisdiction: Government of Syria
- Headquarters: Damascus
- Minister responsible: Mohammad Abdul Rahman Tarkou
- Website: moed.gov.sy

The Ministry of Education (Arabic: وزارة التربية والتعليم) is a government ministry office responsible for elementary and high school education in Syria. The Ministry of Higher Education and Scientific Research is responsible for institutions of higher learning.

The ministry library housed some 13,000 volumes in 2011.

In 2025, the Ministry announced that the school curriculum in Syria would be amended to remove bias and inaccurate materials promoted by the previous government.

== Ministers of Education ==
- Muhammad Kurd Ali (6 September 1920 – 28 June 1922)
- Rida Said (21 December 1924 – 21 December 1925)
- Fares al-Khoury (14 April 1925 – 12 June 1926)
- Haqqi al-Azm (15 November 1933 – 17 March 1934)
- Husni al-Barazi (17 March 1934 – 23 February 1936)
- Abd al-Rahman al-Kayyali (21 December 1936 – 23 February 1939)
- Lutfi al-Haffar ( 23 February 1939 – 5 May 1939)
- Muhsin al-Barazi (5 April 1941 – 12 September 1941)
- Fares al-Khoury (14 October 1944 – 14 March 1945)
- Sabri al-Asali (30 September 1945 – 25 April 1946)
- Munir al-Ajlani (6 October 1947 – 2 December 1948)
- Michel Aflaq (14 August 1949 – 14 December 1949)
- Maamun al-Kuzbari (13 September 1955 – 14 June 1956)
- Abd al-Wahhab Hawmad (June 1956 – December 1956)
- Rashad Barmada (22 December 1961 – 8 March 1963)
- Sami Droubi (9 March 1963 – 11 May 1963)
- Shibli al-Aysami acting (13 May 1963 – 4 August 1963)
- Shaker Fahham (4 August 1963 – 11 November 1963)
- Mustafa Haddad (12 November 1963 – 21 December 1965)
- Abdullah Abd al-Daim (1 January 1966 – 22 February 1966)
- Mustafa Haddad (1 March 1966 – 15 October 1966)
- Mohammad Zied Chouiki (1966–2000)
- Mahmoud al-Sayyed (2000 – 10 September 2003)
- Ali Saad (10 September 2003 – 29 March 2011)
- Saleh al-Rashed (14 April 2011 – 23 June 2012)
- Hazwan al-Wuz (23 June 2012 – 16 November 2016)
- Imad al-Azab (16 November 2016 – 29 August 2020)
- Darem Tabbaa (30 August 2020 – 8 August 2023)
- Muhammad Amer Mardini (8 August 2023 – 8 December 2024)
- Nazir al-Qadri (10 December 2024 – 29 March 2025)
- Mohammad Abdul Rahman Tarkou (29 March 2025 – present)

== See also ==
- Cabinet of Syria
