= National Bloc (Syria) =

National Bloc الكتلة الوطنية
- Historical leaders: Ibrahim Hananu; Hashim al-Atassi; Shukri al-Quwatli; Jamil Mardam Bey; Abd al-Rahman al-Kayyali; Najib al-Barazi
- Founded: 1928
- Dissolved: 1947
- Succeeded by: National Party; People's Party
- Headquarters: Damascus
- Ideology: Syrian nationalism
- Political position: Catch-all (centre-right dominant faction)
- Slogan: Freedom, Justice, equality

The National Bloc (Arabic: الكتلة الوطنية Al-Kutlah Al-Wataniyah; French: Bloc national) was a Syrian political party that emerged to fight for Syrian independence during the French Mandate of Syria period.

== History ==
In October 1927, the National Bloc was founded by Ibrahim Hananu, Hashim al-Atassi, Shukri al-Quwatli, Jamil Mardam Bey, Abd al-Rahman al-Kayyali, and Najib al-Barazi. It was not a structured party but rather a coalition of parties hostile to the French presence in Syria. The Bloc was led by notable conservatives; land owners, tradesmen, lawyers, etc. This coalition gathered the fifty most rich and powerful families of Syria.

The political involvement of these notable people in the struggle for independence is reminiscent of the political struggle carried out in their youth against the Ottoman Empire. The National Bloc had no precise ideology, nor a social and economic agenda. The main objective which drove the movement forward was to return Syria's independence through diplomatic and non-violent actions.

== Legacy ==
Full independence for Syria, the National Bloc's aim, was achieved by 1946 at which point the party could not withstand personal and regional rivalries. The party was dissolved in 1947 and split into two parties: the National Party, based in Damascus, and the People's Party, based in Aleppo. Whereas the People's Party was friendly to the interests of Hashemite Jordan and Iraq, the National Party was opposed to them. Both parties were major players in Syrian politics until the 1963 Syrian coup d'état which brought the Ba'ath Party to power and drove most political parties underground. Following the Damascus Spring, there was speculation that such parties might be revived. With the onset of the Syrian Civil War, a new National Bloc appeared claiming the heritage of the original party. The new movement was co-founded by Mustafa Kayyali, grandson of one of the historical leaders, Abd al-Rahman al-Kayyali.

== Bibliography ==
- Pierre Guingamp, Hafez El Assad et le parti Baath en Syrie, Editions L'Harmattan, 1996, ISBN 2-7384-4678-7

== See also ==
- Munir al-Ajlani

== Links ==
- National Bloc
