= Damascus (former People's Assembly electoral district) =

Former electoral district of Syria's national legislature

- Former electoral district for the People's Assembly
- Location of Damascus within Syria
- Governorate: Damascus
- Population: 2,685,000 (2022 est.)

Former electoral district
- Created: 1973
- Abolished: 2025
- Seats: List: 29 (1990–2025); 22 (1973–1990)
- Created from: Damascus
- Replaced by: Damascus

Damascus (Arabic: دمشق) was an electoral district used to elect members of the Syrian People's Assembly between 1973 and 2025.

== Electoral system ==
The electoral system used to elect the People's Assembly was introduced in 1973 and remained in use until the assembly's dissolution in 2025. Each governorate formed a single, large electoral district, except for Aleppo Governorate, which was divided into two districts: the city of Aleppo and the rural districts of Aleppo Governorate. Within each district, seats were awarded on a block-vote basis, with the candidates receiving the largest number of votes taking all of the seats allocated to it, and the assembly was composed of representatives of two sectors, "workers and peasants" and "other sectors of the people", with the former guaranteed at least half of its seats nationally. The number of seats, and their distribution among districts, was left to the president of the republic to set by decree rather than being fixed in law; the total was raised from 186 to 195 in 1981 and from 195 to 250 in 1990, after which the distribution among the fifteen electoral districts was not changed.

All Syrian citizens aged 18 and over were entitled to vote, other than those under legal guardianship, those with a mental illness affecting their legal capacity, and those convicted of a felony or a "dishonourable" misdemeanour, while serving members of the armed forces and police were barred from voting and from standing as candidates; candidates were further required to be at least 25 years old and to have held Syrian nationality for at least five years, a period raised to ten under the 2011 and 2014 electoral laws. During the 2011 reform of the electoral law, the replacement of this system was discussed because of its weak representativeness, but the large-district, block-vote system was retained; the reform instead moved the administration of elections from the Ministry of Interior and provincial governors to an independent Supreme Judicial Committee for Elections, a structure carried over into a further law passed in 2014 that consolidated the rules for presidential, parliamentary and local-council elections into a single statute.

Beyond being considered unrepresentative — a majoritarian, large-district system of a kind rejected by most electoral systems worldwide — the system has also been criticised for the unevenness of its distribution of seats between governorates. Based on the number of registered voters at the 2012 election, the average was around 59,000 voters per seat nationally, but the ratio varied considerably: about 37,800 voters per seat in Damascus and 51,500 in Tartus, compared with 71,700 in Al-Hasakah and 69,500 in the rural districts of Aleppo Governorate, with no mechanism beyond a presidential decree governing the size of constituencies or the allocation of seats between them.

== Members ==
| Elections | MPA (Party) | MPA (Party) | MPA (Party) | MPA (Party) | MPA (Party) | MPA (Party) | MPA (Party) | MPA (Party) | MPA (Party) | MPA (Party) | MPA (Party) | MPA (Party) | MPA (Party) | MPA (Party) | MPA (Party) | MPA (Party) | MPA (Party) | MPA (Party) | MPA (Party) | MPA (Party) | MPA (Party) | MPA (Party) | MPA (Party) | MPA (Party) | MPA (Party) | MPA (Party) | MPA (Party) | MPA (Party) | MPA (Party) |
|---|---|---|---|---|---|---|---|---|---|---|---|---|---|---|---|---|---|---|---|---|---|---|---|---|---|---|---|---|---|
| 1973 | Mahmoud Hadid (Ba'ath) | Maamun al-Khayyat (N/A) | Muhammad Said al-Hamawi (N/A) | Muhammad Sayyah al-Suruji (N/A) | Muhammad Arabi Sahyun (N/A) | Mahmoud Bakri Aloussi (N/A) | Haydar Mardini (N/A) | Youssef Nimr (N/A) | Mahmoud al-Ayyubi (Ba'ath) | Muhammad Marwan Sheikho (N/A) | Muhammad Ali al-Halabi (Ba'ath) | Muhammad Zuhayr al-Awa (N/A) | Hajar Sadiq (N/A) | Anwar Kamil (N/A) | Muhammad Adnan Kilani (N/A) | Riyad al-Abid (N/A) | Hasan Jumaa (N/A) | Tahsin al-Safadi (N/A) | Ghassan Shalhub (N/A) | Khalid Bakdash (SCP) | Hani al-Rumani (N/A) | Jurji al-Khoury (N/A) | 22 seats | | | | | | |
| 1974 by-election | Mahmoud Hadid (Ba'ath) | Maamun al-Khayyat (N/A) | Muhammad Said al-Hamawi (N/A) | Muhammad Sayyah al-Suruji (N/A) | Muhammad Arabi Sahyun (N/A) | Mahmoud Bakri Aloussi (N/A) | Haydar Mardini (N/A) | Youssef Nimr (N/A) | Mahmoud al-Ayyubi (Ba'ath) | Muhammad Marwan Sheikho (N/A) | Muhammad Ali al-Halabi (Ba'ath) | Muhammad Zuhayr al-Awa (N/A) | Hajar Sadiq (N/A) | Youssef Kamil (N/A) | Muhammad Adnan Kilani (N/A) | Riyad al-Abid (N/A) | Hasan Jumaa (N/A) | Tahsin al-Safadi (N/A) | Ghassan Shalhub (N/A) | Khalid Bakdash (SCP) | Hani al-Rumani (N/A) | Yassin Astah (N/A) | 22 seats | | | | | | |
| 1977 | Mahmoud Hadid (Ba'ath) | Muhammad Thabit Muhayni (N/A) | Muhammad Said al-Hamawi (N/A) | Muhammad Hisham al-Sati (N/A) | Abd al-Razzaq Aqbiq (N/A) | Mahmoud Bakri Aloussi (N/A) | Mahmoud Salama (N/A) | Ibrahim Bakkari (N/A) | Khaldoun al-Maleh (N/A) | Muhammad Marwan Sheikho (N/A) | Muhammad Ali al-Halabi (Ba'ath) | Muhammad al-Amadi (N/A) | Hajar Sadiq (N/A) | Zuhair Urabi (N/A) | Rida Esfahani (N/A) | Youssef Khoury (N/A) | Hasan Jumaa (N/A) | Tahsin al-Safadi (N/A) | Ghassan Shalhub (N/A) | Muhammad Saleha (N/A) | Muhammad Hadi Aqbiq (N/A) | Safwan al-Qudsi (ASUP) | 22 seats | | | | | | |
| 1981 | Yassin Atika (N/A) | Yassin Otabashi (N/A) | Ali al-Turkmeni (N/A) | Muhammad al-Buzum (N/A) | Abd al-Razzaq Aqbiq (N/A) | Rajab Izzo al-Baba (N/A) | Mahmoud Salama (N/A) | Abdo Tama (N/A) | Ahmad Aladdin Abidin (N/A) | Muhammad Marwan Sheikho (N/A) | Abd al-Qadir Qaddura (Ba'ath) | Nur al-Din Habbal (N/A) | Hanan Najmeh (N/A) | Zuhair Urabi (N/A) | Hajar Sadiq (N/A) | Ferial Muhayni (N/A) | Muhammad Samih Skaff (N/A) | Tahsin al-Safadi (N/A) | Ghassan Shalhub (N/A) | Muhammad Shakir Asaid (N/A) | Hani al-Rumani (N/A) | Muhammad Hilal al-Saudi (N/A) | 22 seats | | | | | | |
| 1986 | Farouk Thuraya (N/A) | Hajar Sadiq (N/A) | Ali al-Turkmeni (N/A) | Muhammad Munir Rihawi (N/A) | Abd al-Razzaq Aqbiq (N/A) | Muhammad Khair Halabi (N/A) | Nasr al-Din al-Bahra (N/A) | Muhammad Adib al-Khatib (N/A) | Wissal Farha (N/A) | Muhammad Marwan Sheikho (N/A) | Abd al-Qadir Qaddura (Ba'ath) | Nur al-Din Habbal (N/A) | Hanan Najmeh (N/A) | Zuhair Urabi (N/A) | Muhammad Abu al-Khair Abidin (N/A) | Ferial Muhayni (N/A) | Mahmoud Jabr (N/A) | Muhammad Zuhair al-Awa (N/A) | Muhammad Siyah al-Sarouji (N/A) | Muhammad Shakir Asaid (N/A) | Hani al-Rumani (N/A) | Muhammad Hilal al-Saudi (N/A) | 22 seats | | | | | | |
| 1990 | Farouk Thuraya (N/A) | Muhammad Misbah Baghdadi (N/A) | Ali al-Turkmeni (N/A) | Muhammad Munir Rihawi (N/A) | Abd al-Razzaq Aqbiq (N/A) | Bashira Tawakkalna (N/A) | Ahmad Haidar (N/A) | Mahmoud Salama (N/A) | Wissal Farha (N/A) | Muhammad Marwan Sheikho (N/A) | Abd al-Qadir Qaddura (Ba'ath) | Basil Dahdouh (N/A) | Muhammad Amin Abu al-Shamat (N/A) | Ahmad al-Ghafri (N/A) | Elias Najmeh (N/A) | Ferial Muhayni (N/A) | Mahmoud Jabr (N/A) | Muhammad Fuad al-Asha (N/A) | Abdallah Talaba (N/A) | Muhammad Shakir Asaid (N/A) | Amal Dakkak (N/A) | Badi Fallaheh (N/A) | Baha al-Din al-Hassan (Ind.) | Muhammad Ihsan Sanqar (N/A) | Mahmoud Alousi (N/A) | Muhammad Mamoun al-Homsi (N/A) | Muhyi al-Din Jumaa (N/A) | Muhammad Zuhair al-Awa (N/A) | Colette Khoury (Ind.) |
| 1994 | Farouk Thuraya (N/A) | Muhammad Misbah Baghdadi (N/A) | Ali al-Turkmeni (N/A) | Najwa Qassab Hassan (N/A) | Abd al-Razzaq Aqbiq (N/A) | Nabil Dawoud (Ind.) | Muhammad Yasser Nahlawi (N/A) | Misbah Ghaiba (N/A) | Wissal Farha (N/A) | Muhammad Marwan Sheikho (N/A) | Abd al-Qadir Qaddura (Ba'ath) | Basil Dahdouh (N/A) | Muhammad Fathi Qanawati (N/A) | Mahmoud Qassouma (N/A) | Elias Najmeh (N/A) | Ferial Muhayni (N/A) | Jalal al-Din Idlibi (N/A) | Muhammad Adnan al-Khatib (N/A) | Riad Seif (Ind.) | Muhammad Shakir Asaid (N/A) | Amal Dakkak (N/A) | Badi Fallaheh (N/A) | Baha al-Din al-Hassan (Ind.) | Muhammad Ihsan Sanqar (N/A) | Hashem al-Aqqad (Ind.) | Muhammad Mamoun al-Homsi (N/A) | Basil Hamwi (N/A) | Adnan al-Dakhakhni (Ind.) | Colette Khoury (Ind.) |
| 1996 by-election | Farouk Thuraya (N/A) | Muhammad Misbah Baghdadi (N/A) | Ali al-Turkmeni (N/A) | Najwa Qassab Hassan (N/A) | Abd al-Razzaq Aqbiq (N/A) | Nabil Dawoud (Ind.) | Muhammad Yasser Nahlawi (N/A) | Misbah Ghaiba (N/A) | Wissal Farha (N/A) | Muhammad Marwan Sheikho (N/A) | Abd al-Qadir Qaddura (Ba'ath) | Basil Dahdouh (N/A) | Muhammad Fathi Qanawati (N/A) | Mahmoud Qassouma (N/A) | Akram al-Khoury (N/A) | Ferial Muhayni (N/A) | Jalal al-Din Idlibi (N/A) | Muhammad Adnan al-Khatib (N/A) | Riad Seif (Ind.) | Muhammad Shakir Asaid (N/A) | Amal Dakkak (N/A) | Badi Fallaheh (N/A) | Baha al-Din al-Hassan (Ind.) | Muhammad Ihsan Sanqar (N/A) | Hashem al-Aqqad (Ind.) | Muhammad Mamoun al-Homsi (N/A) | Basil Hamwi (N/A) | Adnan al-Dakhakhni (Ind.) | Colette Khoury (Ind.) |
| 1998 | Farouk Thuraya (N/A) | Mahmoud Zaatariya (N/A) | Mahasin al-Waraa (N/A) | Muhammad Raafat al-Kurdi (N/A) | Abd al-Razzaq Aqbiq (N/A) | Nabil Dawoud (Ind.) | Muhammad Yasser Nahlawi (N/A) | Maha Qunout (N/A) | Ahmad Sameer al-Nouri (N/A) | Muhammad Marwan Sheikho (N/A) | Abd al-Qadir Qaddura (Ba'ath) | Basil Dahdouh (N/A) | Huda al-Homsi (Ba'ath) | Muhammad Issam al-Jammal (N/A) | Akram al-Khoury (N/A) | Muhammad Bashar al-Shami (N/A) | Munther Mousalli (N/A) | Mahmoud Sheikh al-Shabab (N/A) | Riad Seif (Ind.) | Muhammad Shakir Asaid (N/A) | Abd al-Wahhab Rashwani (N/A) | Badi Fallaheh (N/A) | Baha al-Din al-Hassan (Ind.) | Muhammad Aref Hannano (N/A) | Hashem al-Aqqad (Ind.) | Muhammad Mamoun al-Homsi (N/A) | Muhyi al-Din al-Habboush (N/A) | Adnan al-Dakhakhni (Ind.) | Hassan al-Nouri (N/A) |
| 2003 | Suleiman Haddad (Ba'ath) | Amira Urabi (N/A) | Muhammad Khaled Najati (N/A) | Huda Mleihi (Ba'ath) | Muhammad Ammar Saati (Ba'ath) | Nabil Dawoud (Ind.) | Muhammad al-Habash (Ind.) | Ghalib Aneez (Ind.) | Muhammad Farouk Abu al-Shamat (Ba'ath) | Muhammad al-Hallaq (N/A) | Abd al-Qadir Qaddura (Ba'ath) | Basil Dahdouh (N/A) | Huda al-Homsi (Ba'ath) | Muhammad Issam al-Jammal (N/A) | Mai al-Muhaini (N/A) | Haneen Nimr (SCP-B) | Marwan al-Bunni (SUP) | Zakaria Mir Alam (N/A) | Ammar Bakdash (SCP-B) | Mahmoud al-Abrash (Ba'ath) | Muhammad Hamsho (Ind.) | Muhammad Zaher Daabul (Ind.) | Baha al-Din al-Hassan (Ind.) | Joseph Sweid (SSNP) | Hashem al-Aqqad (Ind.) | Ghassan al-Nahhas (N/A) | Muhyi al-Din al-Habboush (N/A) | Adnan al-Dakhakhni (Ind.) | Muhammad Radwan al-Masri (Ind.) |
| 2007 | Suleiman Haddad (Ba'ath) | Munther Karkoutly (Ba'ath) | Atif al-Zaybaq (Ba'ath) | Huda Mleihi (Ba'ath) | Muhammad Ammar Saati (Ba'ath) | Nabil Dawoud (Ind.) | Muhammad al-Habash (Ind.) | Ghalib Aneez (Ind.) | Muhammad Farouk Abu al-Shamat (Ba'ath) | Rama Aziz (Ind.) | Abd al-Salam Rajeh (Ind.) | Muhammad Zuhair Taghlabi (Ba'ath) | Huda al-Homsi (Ba'ath) | Hazar al-Daqar (Ba'ath) | Muhammad Nabil al-Khatib (Ba'ath) | Haneen Nimr (SCP-B) | Marwan al-Bunni (SUP) | Muhammad Sabah al-Ubayd (Ind.) | Ammar Bakdash (SCP-B) | Mahmoud al-Abrash (Ba'ath) | Muhammad Hamsho (Ind.) | Muhammad Zaher Daabul (Ind.) | Baha al-Din al-Hassan (Ind.) | Joseph Sweid (SSNP) | Hashem al-Aqqad (Ind.) | Samer al-Dibs (Ind.) | Amer al-Homsi (Ind.) | Adnan al-Dakhakhni (Ind.) | Muhammad Radwan al-Masri (Ind.) |
| 2009 by-election | Suleiman Haddad (Ba'ath) | Munther Karkoutly (Ba'ath) | Atif al-Zaybaq (Ba'ath) | Huda Mleihi (Ba'ath) | Muhammad Ammar Saati (Ba'ath) | Nabil Dawoud (Ind.) | Muhammad al-Habash (Ind.) | Ghalib Aneez (Ind.) | Muhammad Farouk Abu al-Shamat (Ba'ath) | Rama Aziz (Ind.) | Abd al-Salam Rajeh (Ind.) | Muhammad Zuhair Taghlabi (Ba'ath) | Majda Qteit (Ba'ath) | Hazar al-Daqar (Ba'ath) | Salah al-Din al-Sadat (Ba'ath) | Haneen Nimr (SCP-B) | Marwan al-Bunni (SUP) | Muhammad Sabah al-Ubayd (Ind.) | Ammar Bakdash (SCP-B) | Mahmoud al-Abrash (Ba'ath) | Muhammad Hamsho (Ind.) | Muhammad Zaher Daabul (Ind.) | Baha al-Din al-Hassan (Ind.) | Joseph Sweid (SSNP) | Hashem al-Aqqad (Ind.) | Samer al-Dibs (Ind.) | Amer al-Homsi (Ind.) | Adnan al-Dakhakhni (Ind.) | Muhammad Radwan al-Masri (Ind.) |
| 2012 | Jamal al-Qadri (Ba'ath) | Muhammad Izzat Arabi Katbi (Ba'ath) | Atif al-Zaybaq (Ba'ath) | Mona Sukkar (Ba'ath) | Muhammad Ammar Saati (Ba'ath) | Wafaa Khalifah (Ba'ath) | Sharif Shehadeh (Ind.) | Omar Oussi (Ind.) | Muhammad Akram al-Ajlani (Ind.) | Najm al-Din Shamdin (SSNP) | Qadri Jamil (PWP) | Khalil Mashhadia (Ba'ath) | Majda Qteit (Ba'ath) | Fayez al-Sayegh (Ba'ath) | Muhammad Jihad al-Laham (Ba'ath) | Haneen Nimr (SCP-B) | Muhammad Sobhi Abu al-Shamat (Ba'ath) | Muhammad Amer al-Qabbani (Ba'ath) | Ammar Bakdash (SCP-B) | Nader Baira (Ba'ath) | Muhammad Hamsho (Ind.) | Hazar al-Daqr (Ba'ath) | Khaled al-Abboud (SUP) | Ahmad Kazbari (Until 2012: Ind. From 2012: Ba'ath) | Ahmed Nour al-Din Shallash (Ind.) | Samer al-Dibs (Ind.) | Maria Saadeh (Ind.) | Wa'el al-Ghabra (Ind.) | Youssef Asaad (Ind.) |
| 2014 by-election | Jamal al-Qadri (Ba'ath) | Muhammad Izzat Arabi Katbi (Ba'ath) | Atif al-Zaybaq (Ba'ath) | Mona Sukkar (Ba'ath) | Muhammad Ammar Saati (Ba'ath) | Maha Shbero (Ba'ath) | Sharif Shehadeh (Ind.) | Omar Oussi (Ind.) | Muhammad Akram al-Ajlani (Ind.) | Najm al-Din Shamdin (SSNP) | Qadri Jamil (PWP) | Khalil Mashhadia (Ba'ath) | Majda Qteit (Ba'ath) | Fayez al-Sayegh (Ba'ath) | Muhammad Jihad al-Laham (Ba'ath) | Haneen Nimr (SCP-B) | Muhammad Sobhi Abu al-Shamat (Ba'ath) | Muhammad Amer al-Qabbani (Ba'ath) | Ammar Bakdash (SCP-B) | Nader Baira (Ba'ath) | Muhammad Hamsho (Ind.) | Hazar al-Daqr (Ba'ath) | Khaled al-Abboud (SUP) | Ahmad Kazbari (Until 2012: Ind. From 2012: Ba'ath) | Ahmed Nour al-Din Shallash (Ind.) | Samer al-Dibs (Ind.) | Maria Saadeh (Ind.) | Wa'el al-Ghabra (Ind.) | Youssef Asaad (Ind.) |
| 2015 by-election | Jamal al-Qadri (Ba'ath) | Muhammad Izzat Arabi Katbi (Ba'ath) | Atif al-Zaybaq (Ba'ath) | Mona Sukkar (Ba'ath) | Muhammad Ammar Saati (Ba'ath) | Maha Shbero (Ba'ath) | Sharif Shehadeh (Ind.) | Omar Oussi (Ind.) | Muhammad Akram al-Ajlani (Ind.) | Najm al-Din Shamdin (SSNP) | Tarif Qutrash (Ind.) | Khalil Mashhadia (Ba'ath) | Majda Qteit (Ba'ath) | Fayez al-Sayegh (Ba'ath) | Muhammad Jihad al-Laham (Ba'ath) | Haneen Nimr (SCP-B) | Muhammad Sobhi Abu al-Shamat (Ba'ath) | Muhammad Amer al-Qabbani (Ba'ath) | Ammar Bakdash (SCP-B) | Sameer al-Jazaerli (Ba'ath) | Muhammad Hamsho (Ind.) | Hazar al-Daqr (Ba'ath) | Khaled al-Abboud (SUP) | Ahmad Kazbari (Until 2012: Ind. From 2012: Ba'ath) | Ahmed Nour al-Din Shallash (Ind.) | Samer al-Dibs (Ind.) | Maria Saadeh (Ind.) | Wa'el al-Ghabra (Ind.) | Youssef Asaad (Ind.) |
| 2016 | Abbas Sandouq (Ba'ath) | Muhammad Izzat Arabi Katbi (Ba'ath) | Atif al-Zaybaq (Ba'ath) | Mona Sukkar (Ba'ath) | Ahd al-Kanj (Ba'ath) | Maha Shbero (Ba'ath) | Samer al-Ayyubi (Ind.) | Omar Oussi (Ind.) | Muhammad Akram al-Ajlani (Ind.) | Farah Hamsho (Ind.) | Tarif Qutrash (Ind.) | Sameer Hajjar (SSNP) | Hassib Tahhan (Ba'ath) | Aref al-Tawil (Ba'ath) | Muhammad Jihad al-Laham (Ba'ath) | Mary al-Bitar (Ba'ath) | Muhammad Bashir al-Shurbaji (Ba'ath) | Muhammad Khair al-Akkam (Ba'ath) | Ammar Bakdash (SCP-B) | Nabil Toumeh (Ba'ath) | Muhammad Hamsho (Ind.) | Anas Zuray (Ind.) | Khalil Taameh (Ind.) | Ahmad Kazbari (Until 2012: Ind. From 2012: Ba'ath) | Muhammad Maher al-Bustani (Ind.) | Samer al-Dibs (Ind.) | Muhammad Humam Masouti (Ind.) | Noura Arisian (Ind.) | Hadi Sharaf (Ind.) |
| 2018 by-election | Abbas Sandouq (Ba'ath) | Muhammad Izzat Arabi Katbi (Ba'ath) | Atif al-Zaybaq (Ba'ath) | Mona Sukkar (Ba'ath) | Ahd al-Kanj (Ba'ath) | Maha Shbero (Ba'ath) | Samer al-Ayyubi (Ind.) | Omar Oussi (Ind.) | Muhammad Akram al-Ajlani (Ind.) | Farah Hamsho (Ind.) | Tarif Qutrash (Ind.) | Sameer Hajjar (SSNP) | Hassib Tahhan (Ba'ath) | Aref al-Tawil (Ba'ath) | Maan Ghanim (Ba'ath) | Mary al-Bitar (Ba'ath) | Muhammad Bashir al-Shurbaji (Ba'ath) | Muhammad Khair al-Akkam (Ba'ath) | Ammar Bakdash (SCP-B) | Nabil Toumeh (Ba'ath) | Muhammad Hamsho (Ind.) | Anas Zuray (Ind.) | Khalil Taameh (Ind.) | Ahmad Kazbari (Until 2012: Ind. From 2012: Ba'ath) | Muhammad Maher al-Bustani (Ind.) | Samer al-Dibs (Ind.) | Muhammad Humam Masouti (Ind.) | Noura Arisian (Ind.) | Hadi Sharaf (Ind.) |
| 2020 | Muhammad Hadi Mashhadiyah (Ba'ath) | Muhammad Izzat Arabi Katbi (Ba'ath) | Atif al-Zaybaq (Ba'ath) | Bushra Zurayqa (Ba'ath) | Nidal Muhanna (Ba'ath) | Muhammad Manaf al-Aqqad (Ba'ath) | Nuha Mahayri (Ind.) | Samer al-Ayyoubi (Ind.) | Muhammad Akram al-Ajlani (Ind.) | Muhammad Khaled al-Shuweiki (Ind.) | Elias Shahoud (Ba'ath) | Sameer Hajjar (SSNP) | Basima Shater (Ba'ath) | Aref al-Tawil (Ba'ath) | Muhammad Zuheir Tinawi (Ba'ath) | Mary al-Bitar (Ba'ath) | Muhammad Ghazwan al-Masri (Ba'ath) | Muhammad Khair al-Akkam (Ba'ath) | Ammar Bakdash (SCP-B) | Nabil Toumeh (Ba'ath) | Muhammad Humam Masouti (Ind.) | Bilal al-Naal (Ind.) | Abd al-Rahman al-Jaafari (Ind.) | Ahmad Kazbari (Until 2012: Ind. From 2012: Ba'ath) | Jamil Murad (Ind.) | Samer al-Dibs (Ind.) | Abd al-Rahman al-Masri (Ind.) | Noura Arisian (Ind.) | Abd al-Rahman Urabi (Ind.) |
| 2022 by-election | Muhammad Hadi Mashhadiyah (Ba'ath) | Muhammad Izzat Arabi Katbi (Ba'ath) | Atif al-Zaybaq (Ba'ath) | Bushra Zurayqa (Ba'ath) | Nidal Muhanna (Ba'ath) | Muhammad Manaf al-Aqqad (Ba'ath) | Nuha Mahayri (Ind.) | Samer al-Ayyoubi (Ind.) | Muhammad Akram al-Ajlani (Ind.) | Muhammad Khaled al-Shuweiki (Ind.) | Elias Shahoud (Ba'ath) | Sameer Hajjar (SSNP) | Basima Shater (Ba'ath) | Aref al-Tawil (Ba'ath) | Muhammad Zuheir Tinawi (Ba'ath) | Mary al-Bitar (Ba'ath) | Muhammad Ghazwan al-Masri (Ba'ath) | Muhammad Khair al-Akkam (Ba'ath) | Ammar Bakdash (SCP-B) | Nabil Toumeh (Ba'ath) | Muhammad Humam Masouti (Ind.) | Bilal al-Naal (Ind.) | Abd al-Rahman al-Jaafari (Ind.) | Ahmad Kazbari (Until 2012: Ind. From 2012: Ba'ath) | Jamil Murad (Ind.) | Samer al-Dibs (Ind.) | Abd al-Rahman al-Masri (Ind.) | Ruba Mirza (Ind.) | Abd al-Rahman Urabi (Ind.) |
| 2023 by-election | Muhammad Hadi Mashhadiyah (Ba'ath) | Muhammad Izzat Arabi Katbi (Ba'ath) | Atif al-Zaybaq (Ba'ath) | Bushra Zurayqa (Ba'ath) | Nidal Muhanna (Ba'ath) | Muhammad Manaf al-Aqqad (Ba'ath) | Nuha Mahayri (Ind.) | Samer al-Ayyoubi (Ind.) | Muhammad Akram al-Ajlani (Ind.) | Muhammad Khaled al-Shuweiki (Ind.) | Elias Shahoud (Ba'ath) | Sameer Hajjar (SSNP) | Muhammad Nabil al-Homsi (Ba'ath) | Aref al-Tawil (Ba'ath) | Muhammad Zuheir Tinawi (Ba'ath) | Mary al-Bitar (Ba'ath) | Muhammad Ghazwan al-Masri (Ba'ath) | Muhammad Khair al-Akkam (Ba'ath) | Ammar Bakdash (SCP-B) | Nabil Toumeh (Ba'ath) | Muhammad Humam Masouti (Ind.) | Bilal al-Naal (Ind.) | Abd al-Rahman al-Jaafari (Ind.) | Ahmad Kazbari (Until 2012: Ind. From 2012: Ba'ath) | Jamil Murad (Ind.) | Samer al-Dibs (Ind.) | Abd al-Rahman al-Masri (Ind.) | Ruba Mirza (Ind.) | Abd al-Rahman Urabi (Ind.) |
| 2024 | Muhammad Hadi Mashhadiyah (Ba'ath) | Ahd al-Kanj (Ba'ath) | Raedah Waqaf (Ba'ath) | Firas al-Azab (Ba'ath) | Ahmad al-Issa (Ba'ath) | Nabil Dawoud (Ind.) | Nuha Mahayri (Ind.) | Muhammad Thaer al-Johari (Ba'ath) | Muhammad Akram al-Ajlani (Ind.) | Ghaleb Aniz (Ind.) | Elias Shahoud (Ba'ath) | Sameer al-Jazaerli (Ba'ath) | Alaa Zaza (Ba'ath) | Anwar al-Zeer (Ba'ath) | Inas Zarzoor (Ba'ath) | Khalil Wannous (Ba'ath) | Muhammad Khaled Zbeidi (Ba'ath) | Raed al-Aqqad (DSUP) | Elias al-Munayyir (SCP-U) | Anas al-Khatib (Ba'ath) | Muhammad Hamsho (Ind.) | Bilal al-Naal (Ind.) | Fahd Mahmoud (Ind.) | Muhammad Nadhir al-Haffar (Ind.) | Jamil Murad (Ind.) | Muhammad Omar al-Kheimi (Ind.) | Muhammad Mazen Hassan (Ind.) | Bashar al-Khani (Ind.) | Heba Khodra (Ind.) |
| 2024 by-election | Muhammad Hadi Mashhadiyah (Ba'ath) | Ahd al-Kanj (Ba'ath) | Raedah Waqaf (Ba'ath) | Firas al-Azab (Ba'ath) | Ahmad al-Issa (Ba'ath) | Nabil Dawoud (Ind.) | Nuha Mahayri (Ind.) | Muhammad Thaer al-Johari (Ba'ath) | Muhammad Akram al-Ajlani (Ind.) | Ghaleb Aniz (Ind.) | Elias Shahoud (Ba'ath) | Sameer al-Jazaerli (Ba'ath) | Alaa Zaza (Ba'ath) | Anwar al-Zeer (Ba'ath) | Inas Zarzoor (Ba'ath) | Khalil Wannous (Ba'ath) | Vacant (Note: By-elections were cancelled. See 2024 by-election.) | Raed al-Aqqad (DSUP) | Elias al-Munayyir (SCP-U) | Vacant | Vacant | Bilal al-Naal (Ind.) | Fahd Mahmoud (Ind.) | Muhammad Nadhir al-Haffar (Ind.) | Jamil Murad (Ind.) | Muhammad Omar al-Kheimi (Ind.) | Muhammad Mazen Hassan (Ind.) | Bashar al-Khani (Ind.) | Heba Khodra (Ind.) |
