= 3rd People's Assembly of Syria (2020–2024) =

Legislative term of Syria's parliament from 2020 to 2024

3rd People's Assembly
←	2nd	4th	→

Overview
- Legislative body: People's Assembly
- Jurisdiction: Syria
- Meeting place: People's Assembly Building, Damascus
- Term: 10 August 2020 – 27 June 2024
- Election: 2020
- Government: Arnous I (until 10 August 2021); Arnous II (from 10 August 2021)
- Members: 250
- Speaker: Hammouda Sabbagh (Ba'ath Party)

Sessions
- 1st: 10 August 2020 – ?
- 2nd: ? – ?
- 3rd: ? – ?
- 4th: ? – ?
- 5th: ? – ?
- 6th: ? – ?
- 7th: ? – ?
- 8th: ? – ?
- 9th: ? – ?
- 10th: ? – ?
- 11th: ? – 27 June 2024

The Third People's Assembly (Arabic: مجلس الشعب للدور التشريعي الثالث, romanized: Majlis al-Shaʿb lil-dawr al-tashrīʿī al-thālith) was the third legislative term of the People's Assembly of Syria under the 2012 Constitution. It sat from 10 August 2020 until 27 June 2024 and was the twelfth parliamentary term since the beginning of the Corrective Movement in 1970, and the fifth during the presidency of Bashar al-Assad.

== Bureau of the People's Assembly ==
The Bureau is the Assembly's administrative leadership body, made up of the Speaker, Deputy Speaker, two Secretaries and two Overseers, elected for a one-year renewable term. It sets the agenda for plenary sittings, oversees the Assembly's committees and General Secretariat, and prepares its annual budget, meeting at least fortnightly in closed session with decisions taken by majority vote.

Position	Name	Party	Tenure
Speaker	Hammouda Sabbagh	Ba'ath Party	10 August 2020 – 27 June 2024
Deputy Speaker	Muhammad Akram al-Ajlani	Independent	10 August 2020 – 27 June 2024
Secretary	Salloum al-Salloum	Ba'ath Party	10 August 2020 – 27 June 2024
Secretary	Maysaa Salih	Ba'ath Party	10 August 2020 – 27 June 2024
Overseer	Faiza al-Adhbah	Ba'ath Party	10 August 2020 – 27 June 2024
Overseer	Muhammad Sulayman al-Abrash	National Covenant	10 August 2020 – 27 June 2024

== Members ==
Party		Members
NPF	Ba'ath Party	170 / 250 (68%)
NPF	Syrian Social Nationalist Party	3 / 250 (1%)
NPF	Communist (Unified)	3 / 250 (1%)
NPF	Arab Socialist Union Party	2 / 250 (0.8%)
NPF	Socialist Unionist Party	2 / 250 (0.8%)
NPF	National Covenant Party	2 / 250 (0.8%)
NPF	Communist (Bakdash)	1 / 250 (0.4%)
NPF	Democratic Socialist Unionist Party	1 / 250 (0.4%)
NPF	Arab Democratic Union Party	1 / 250 (0.4%)
Independent		67 / 250 (27%)
