= 4th People's Assembly of Syria (2024) =

Legislative term of Syria's parliament in 2024

4th People's Assembly
←	3rd	Transitional	→

Overview
- Legislative body: People's Assembly
- Jurisdiction: Syria
- Meeting place: People's Assembly Building, Damascus
- Term: 21 August – 12 December 2024
- Election: 2024
- Government: al-Jalali
- Members: 250
- Speaker: Hammouda Sabbagh (Ba'ath Party)

The Fourth People's Assembly (Arabic: مجلس الشعب للدور التشريعي الرابع, romanized: Majlis al-Shaʿb lil-dawr al-tashrīʿī al-rābiʻ) was the fourth legislative term of the People's Assembly of Syria under the 2012 Constitution. The Assembly convened for the first time on 21 August 2024. The Assembly was suspended on 12 December 2024 following the fall of the Assad regime, and later dissolved on 29 January 2025. This legislature is the last under Ba'athist Syria, and the twenty-second in Syria's republican history.

== Bureau of the People's Assembly ==
The Burea was elected on the Assembly's second meeting on 22 August.

The Bureau is the Assembly's administrative leadership body, made up of the Speaker, Deputy Speaker, two Secretaries and two Overseers, elected for a one-year renewable term. It sets the agenda for plenary sittings, oversees the Assembly's committees and General Secretariat, and prepares its annual budget, meeting at least fortnightly in closed session with decisions taken by majority vote.

Position	Name	Party	Tenure
Speaker	Hammouda Sabbagh	Ba'ath Party	22 August – 12 December 2024
Deputy Speaker	Maher Hajjar	Independent	22 August – 12 December 2024
Secretary	Muhammad Thaer al-Johari	Ba'ath Party	22 August – 12 December 2024
Secretary	Fawzia Manna	Ba'ath Party	22 August – 12 December 2024
Overseer	Ayman Ahmad	Ba'ath Party	22 August – 12 December 2024
Overseer	Jamal Ali Suleiman	ASU	22 August – 12 December 2024

== Members ==
Party		Members		
Party		Elected in 2024	At dissolution	Difference
NPF	Ba'ath Party	169 / 250 (68%)	166 / 250 (66%)	▼3
NPF	Arab Socialist Union Party	4 / 250 (2%)	4 / 250 (2%)	Steady
NPF	Syrian Social Nationalist Party	3 / 250 (1%)	3 / 250 (1%)	Steady
NPF	Communist (Unified)	3 / 250 (1%)	3 / 250 (1%)	Steady
NPF	National Covenant Party	2 / 250 (0.8%)	2 / 250 (0.8%)	Steady
NPF	Communist (Bakdash)	1 / 250 (0.4%)	1 / 250 (0.4%)	Steady
NPF	Democratic Socialist Unionist Party	1 / 250 (0.4%)	1 / 250 (0.4%)	Steady
NPF	Arab Democratic Union Party	1 / 250 (0.4%)	1 / 250 (0.4%)	Steady
NPF	Socialist Unionist Party	1 / 250 (0.4%)	1 / 250 (0.4%)	Steady
Independent		65 / 250 (26%)	62 / 250 (25%)	▼3
Vacant		0	6 / 250 (2%)	▲6
