= 1st People's Assembly of Syria (2012–2016) =

Legislative term of Syria's parliament from 2012 to 2016

1st People's Assembly
←	9th	2nd	→

Overview
- Legislative body: People's Assembly
- Jurisdiction: Syria
- Meeting place: People's Assembly Building, Damascus
- Term: 24 May 2012 – 23 May 2016
- Election: 2012
- Government: Hijab (until 6 August 2012); al-Halqi I (9 August 2012 – 10 August 2014; al-Halqi II (since 10 August 2014)
- Members: 250
- Speaker: Mohammad Jihad al-Laham (Ba'ath Party)

Sessions
- 1st: 24 May – 28 June 2012
- 2nd: 2 October – 31 December 2012
- 3rd: 17 February – 28 March 2013
- 4th: 15 May – 30 June 2013
- 5th: 7 October – 31 December 2013
- 6th: 16 February – 31 March 2014
- 7th: 18 May – 30 June 2014
- 8th: 12 October – 31 December 2014
- 9th: 1 February 2015 – ?
- 10th: 7 June – 31 July 2015
- 11th: 4 October – 30 December 2015
- 12th: 7 February – 31 March 2016

Special sessions
- 1st: ? – ?
- 2nd: 6 April – 5 May 2014
- 3rd: 13–16 July 2014
- 4th: 21–23 September 2014

The First People's Assembly (Arabic: مجلس الشعب للدور التشريعي الأول, romanized: Majlis al-Shaʿb lil-dawr al-tashrīʿī al-awwal) was the first legislative term of the People's Assembly of Syria under the 2012 Constitution.

Following the adoption of the constitution, the numbering of legislative terms was reset; although officially designated the "First" People's Assembly under the new constitutional system, it was the tenth legislature since 1973, and the nineteenth in Syria's republican history. The assembly sat from 24 May 2012 to 23 May 2016 during the early years of the Syrian civil war.

== Elections and formation ==
Legislative elections were held on 7 May 2012. These elections were the first held after the outbreak of the Syrian conflict in 2011 and the first conducted under the 2012 Constitution, which introduced provisions for political pluralism. They were also the tenth legislative elections since the Corrective Movement and the third held during the presidency of Bashar al-Assad.

The newly elected assembly convened for its first session on 24 May 2012. It consisted of 250 members, including 32 women. Its composition included representatives from the National Progressive Front alongside other political parties and independent deputies. Among the participating parties were the Arab Socialist Ba'ath Party, the Syrian Communist Party (Bakdash), the Syrian Communist Party (Unified), the Arab Socialist Union, the Socialist Unionists, the Democratic Socialist Unionist Party, the Arab Socialist Movement, the Arab Democratic Union Party, the Syrian Social Nationalist Party, the National Covenant Party, the People's Will Party, and independents.

== Bureau of the People's Assembly ==
Position	Name	Party	Tenure
Speaker	Mohammad Jihad al-Laham	Ba'ath Party	24 May 2012 – 23 May 2016
Deputy Speaker	Fahmi Hassan	Independent	24 May 2012 – 23 May 2016
Secretary	Khaled al-Abboud	Socialist Unionist	24 May 2012 – 23 May 2016
Secretary	Abdul-Muti Mishlab	Ba'ath Party	24 May 2012 – 23 May 2016
Overseer	Rami Saleh	Ba'ath Party	24 May 2012 – 23 May 2016
Overseer	Maria Saadeh	Independent	24 May 2012 – 23 May 2016

== Members ==
Party		Members		
Party		Elected in 2012	At dissolution	Difference
NPF	Ba'ath Party	159	159	Steady
NPF	ASU	4	4	Steady
NPF	Communist (Unified)	3	3	Steady
NPF	Communist (Bakdash)	2	2	Steady
NPF	Socialist Unionist	2	2	Steady
NPF	Arab Socialist Movement	2	2	Steady
NPF	DSUP	2	1	▼1
NPF	ADUP	1	1	Steady
NPF	National Covenant	1	1	Steady
PFCL	SSNP	6	6	Steady
PFCL	People's Will Party	2	1	▼1
Independent		66	68	▲2

== Major legislation ==
- Law No. 5 of 24 March 2014 issuing the General Elections Law
- Law No. 7 of 16 April 2014 regarding the Supreme Constitutional Court

== Notable developments ==
The first legislative term under the 2012 Constitution witnessed several institutional and political developments. New permanent committees were established within the Assembly, including committees on public freedoms and human rights, women, family and children, youth and sports, media and communications, national reconciliation, and matters relating to war victims and martyrs.

During the Syrian conflict, several members of the Assembly were abducted or killed.
