= 2nd People's Assembly of Syria (2016–2020) =

Legislative term of Syria's parliament from 2016 to 2020

2nd People's Assembly
←	1st	3rd	→

Overview
- Legislative body: People's Assembly
- Jurisdiction: Syria
- Meeting place: People's Assembly Building, Damascus
- Term: 6 June 2016 – 25 June 2020
- Election: 2016
- Government: Khamis
- Members: 250
- Speaker: Hadiya Khalaf Abbas (Ba'ath Party) (until 20 July 2017); Hammouda Sabbagh (Ba'ath Party) (from 28 September 2017)

Sessions
- 1st: 6 June 2016 – ?
- 2nd: 3 October – 29 December 2016
- 3rd: ? – ?
- 4th: ? – ?
- 5th: 17 September – 21 December 2017
- 6th: 21 January – 5 March 2018
- 7th: 7 May – 3 July 2018
- 8th: 16 September – 20 December 2018
- 9th: 20 January 2019 – ?
- 10th: 12 October – 27 June 2019
- 11th: ? – ?
- 12th: ? – ?
- 13th: ? – 25 June 2020

The Second People's Assembly (Arabic: مجلس الشعب للدور التشريعي الثاني, romanized: Majlis al-Shaʿb lil-dawr al-tashrīʿī al-thānī) was the second legislative term of the People's Assembly of Syria under the 2012 Constitution. It sat from 6 June 2016 until 25 June 2020 and was the eleventh parliamentary term since the beginning of the Corrective Movement in 1970, and the fourth during the presidency of Bashar al-Assad.

== Elections and formation ==
Legislative elections were held on 13 April 2016. The newly elected assembly, composed of 250 members including 32 women, convened for its first session on 6 June 2016. Its membership represented parties of the National Progressive Front, including the Arab Socialist Ba'ath Party, the Syrian Communist Party (Bakdash), the Syrian Communist Party (Unified), the Arab Socialist Union, the Socialist Unionists, the National Covenant Party, the Syrian Social Nationalist Party, as well as independent deputies.

At its inaugural session, the Assembly elected Hadiya Abbas as Speaker, making her the first woman to hold the position since the establishment of a national parliament in 1919.

== Bureau of the People's Assembly ==
Position	Name	Party	Tenure
Speaker	Hadiya Khalaf Abbas	Ba'ath Party	6 June 2016 – 20 July 2017
Speaker	Hammouda Sabbagh	Ba'ath Party	28 September 2017 – 25 June 2020
Deputy Speaker	Najdat Anzour	Independent	6 June 2016 – 25 June 2020
Secretary	Rami Saleh	Ba'ath Party	6 June 2016 – 25 June 2020
Secretary	Khaled al-Abboud	Socialist Unionist	6 June 2016 – 25 June 2020
Overseer	Atif al-Zaybaq	Ba'ath Party	6 June 2016 – 25 June 2020
Overseer	Maher Qawarma	Ba'ath Party	6 June 2016
Overseer	Sanaa Abu Zaid	Ba'ath Party	7 June 2016 – 25 June 2020

== Members ==
Party		Members
NPF	Ba'ath Party	167 / 250 (67%)
NPF	Syrian Social Nationalist Party	7 / 250 (3%)
NPF	Arab Socialist Union Party	2 / 250 (0.8%)
NPF	Communist (Unified)	2 / 250 (0.8%)
NPF	Communist (Bakdash)	2 / 250 (0.8%)
NPF	Socialist Unionist Party	2 / 250 (0.8%)
NPF	National Covenant Party	1 / 250 (0.4%)
Independent		67 / 250 (27%)

== Internal developments ==
The Assembly underwent significant institutional changes during this term. In July 2017, it adopted new rules of procedure that introduced structural and procedural reforms. These included a more systematic organisation of parliamentary procedures, new mechanisms for questioning ministers, revised rules for voting, expanded provisions governing parliamentary debate, and updated roles for committees and the General Secretariat.

The new rules also formalised procedures for electing and dismissing members of the Assembly's bureau, and introduced updated frameworks for parliamentary diplomacy and media operations.

== Major legislations ==
- Law No. 13 of 31 July 2016 establishing the Ministry of Social Affairs and Labour
- Law No. 14 of 31 July 2016 establishing the Ministry of Public Works and Housing
- Law No. 15 of 31 July 2016 establishing the Ministry of Local Administration and Environment
- Law No. 10 of 2 April 2018 concerning the creation of regulatory zones within administrative units
- Law No. 14 of 12 April 2018 regulating the functions and authorities of deputy ministers
- Law No. 28 of 18 July 2018 regulating the Ministry of Administrative Development
- Law No. 31 of 21 October 2018 regulating the Ministry of Endowments
- Law No. 37 of 24 October 2018 regulating the Ministry of Internal Trade and Consumer Protection
- Law No. 45 of 18 December 2018 granting benefits to injured military personnel
- Law No. 4 of 7 February 2019 amending provisions of the Personal Status Law
- Resolution of 13 February 2020 recognising and condemning the Armenian genocide, and calling on parliaments worldwide to acknowledge the events and denouncing denial efforts

== Elections of 2020 and dissolution ==
In 2020, elections for the subsequent legislative term were initially scheduled for April but were postponed twice due to the COVID-19 pandemic. The elections were ultimately held in July 2020.

The results were issued by presidential decree on 30 July 2020, and the outgoing Assembly was formally succeeded by the Third People's Assembly, which was called to convene on 10 August 2020.
