= 2003 Syrian parliamentary election =

- 5 March 2003

All 250 seats in the Parliament of Syria 126 seats needed for a majority
- Registered: 7,181,206
- Turnout: 63.45% (▼24.77pp)
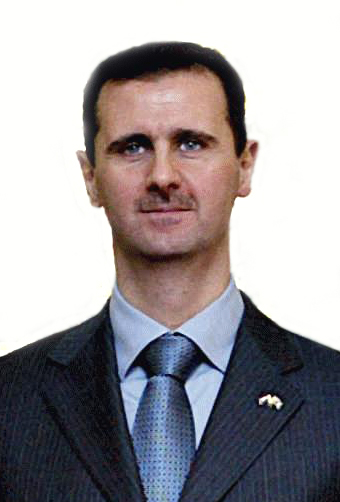
	First party	Second party
		IND
Leader	Bashar al-Assad	Independent politicians
Party	Ba'ath Party	Independents
Alliance	NPF
Last election	135	83
Seats won	135	83
Seat change	Steady	Steady
Speaker before election
Abdel Kader Kaddoura
Ba'ath Party
Elected Speaker
Muhammad Naji al-Otari
Ba'ath Party

Parliamentary elections were held in Syria on 5 March 2003. The number of seats reserved for the parties in the National Progressive Front was 167, and that reserved for independents 83.

== Results ==
Party	Votes	%	Seats	+/–
Ba'ath Party			135	0
Syrian Communist Party			8	0
Arab Socialist Union Party			7	0
Socialist Unionist Party			7	0
Arab Socialist Movement			4	0
Democratic Socialist Unionist Party			4	0
National Covenant Party			2	New
Independents			83	0
Total			250	–
Total votes	4,556,475	–		
Registered voters/turnout	7,181,206	63.45		
Source: IPU
