= 1998 Syrian parliamentary election =

- 30 November–1 December 1998

All 250 seats in the Parliament of Syria 126 seats needed for a majority
- Registered: 6,691,323
- Turnout: 82.22% (▲21.05pp)
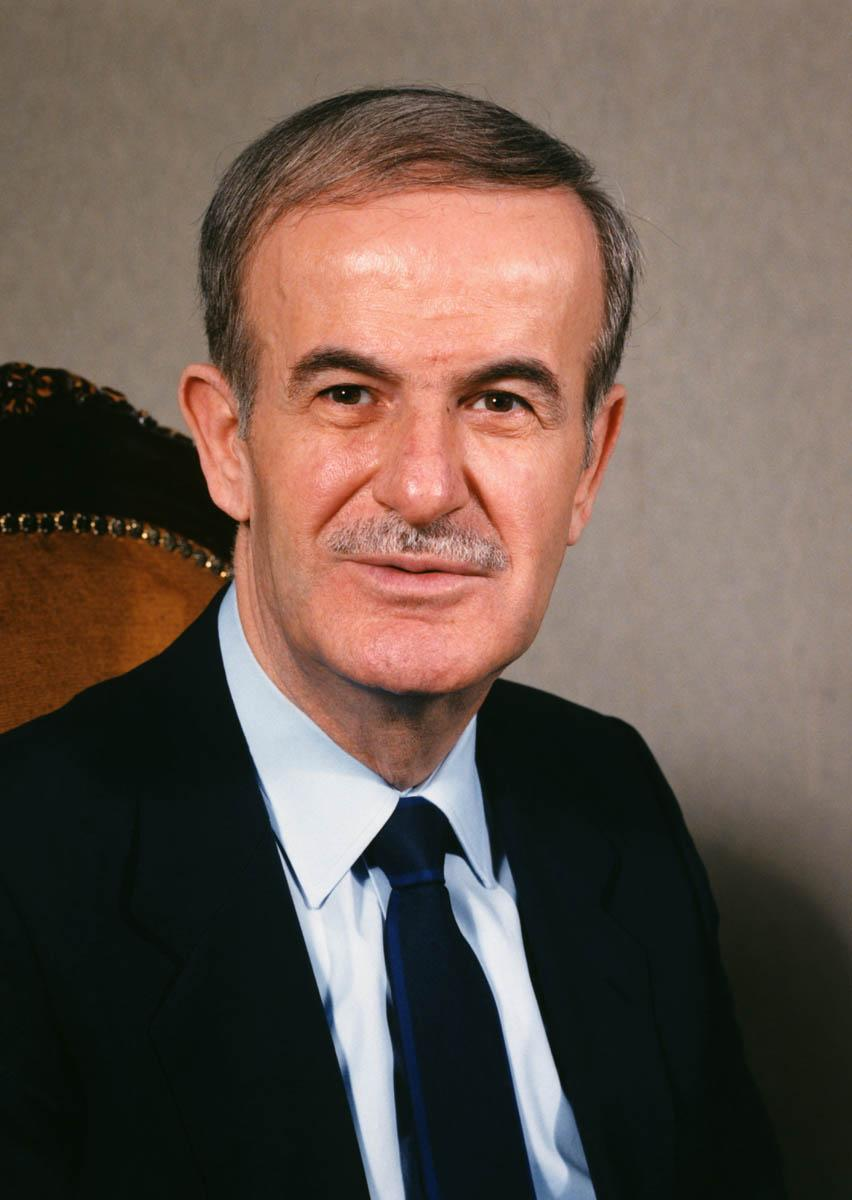
	First party	Second party
		IND
Leader	Hafez al-Assad	Independent politicians
Party	Ba'ath Party	Independents
Alliance	NPF
Last election	135	83
Seats won	135	83
Speaker before election
Abd al-Qadir Qaddura
Ba'ath Party
Elected Speaker
Abd al-Qadir Qaddura
Ba'ath Party

Parliamentary elections were held in Syria were held between 30 November and 1 December 1998 to elect members of the People's Council of Syria, the unicameral parliament. The result was a victory for the Ba'ath Party, which won 135 of the 250 seats. Voter turnout was 82%.

== Results ==
Party	Votes	%	Seats	+/–
Ba'ath Party			135	0
Syrian Communist Party			8	0
Arab Socialist Union Party			7	0
Socialist Unionist Party			7	0
Arab Socialist Movement			4	0
Democratic Socialist Unionist Party			4	0
Arab Democratic Union Party			2	0
Independents			83	0
Total			250	0
Total votes	5,501,940	–		
Registered voters/turnout	6,691,323	82.22		
Source: Nohlen et al., IPU
