= 1994 Syrian parliamentary election =

- 24–25 August 1994

All 250 seats in the Parliament of Syria 126 seats needed for a majority
- Registered: 6,037,885
- Turnout: 61.17% (▲11.53pp)
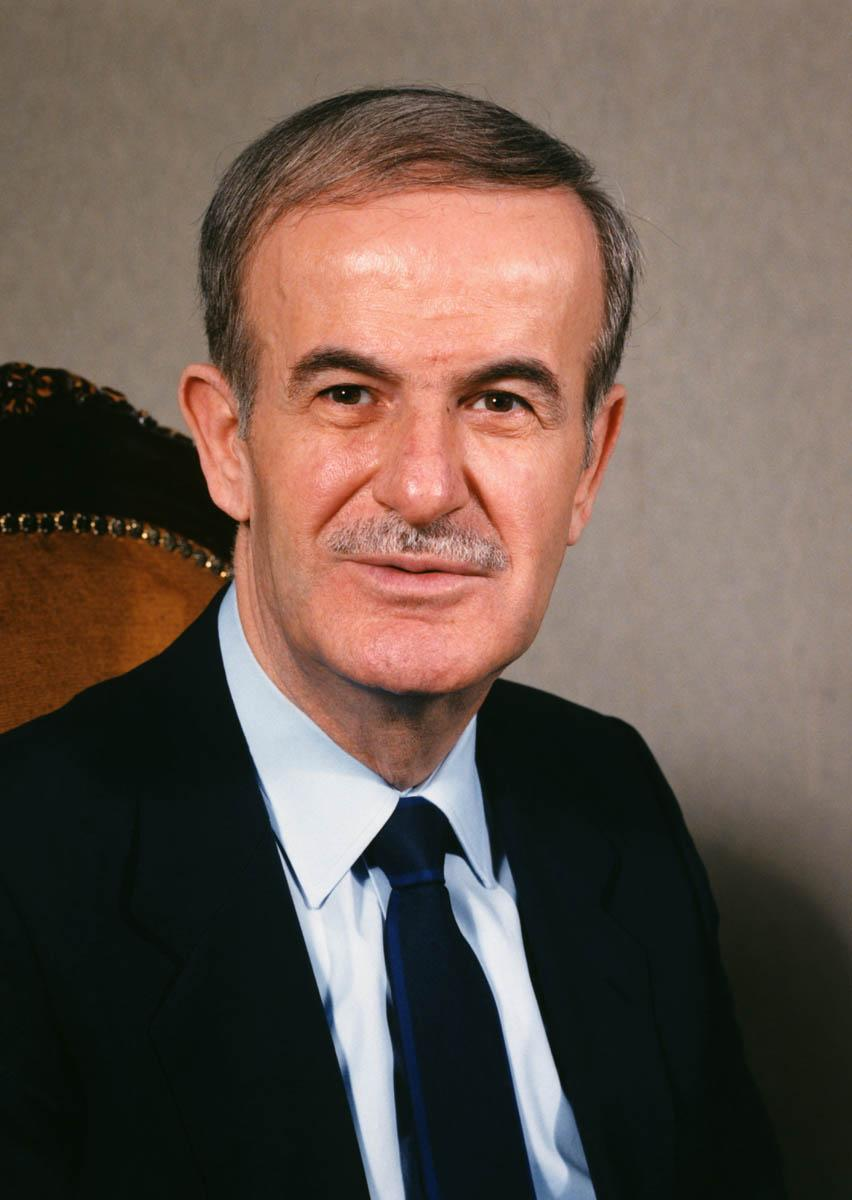
	First party	Second party
		IND
Leader	Hafez al-Assad	Independent politicians
Party	Ba'ath Party	Independents
Alliance	NPF
Last election	134	84
Seats won	135	83
Seat change	▲1	▼1
Speaker before election
Abd al-Qadir Qaddura
Ba'ath Party
Elected Speaker
Abd al-Qadir Qaddura
Ba'ath Party

Parliamentary elections were held in Syria on 24 and 25 August 1994. Members were elected using the multiple non-transferable vote in fifteen districts, with an average district magnitude of 16.7. The result was a victory for the Ba'ath Party, which won 135 of the 250 seats. Voter turnout was 61.2%.

== Results ==
Party	Votes	%	Seats	+/–
Ba'ath Party			135	+1
Syrian Communist Party			8	0
Arab Socialist Union Party			7	–1
Socialist Unionist Party			7	0
Arab Socialist Movement			4	–1
Democratic Socialist Unionist Party			4	0
Arab Democratic Union Party			2	New
Independents			83	–1
Total			250	0
Total votes	3,693,656	–		
Registered voters/turnout	6,037,885	61.17		
Source: Nohlen et al., IPU
