= 1990 Syrian parliamentary election =

- 22–23 May 1990

All 250 seats in the Parliament of Syria 126 seats needed for a majority
- Registered: 6,576,907
- Turnout: 49.64%
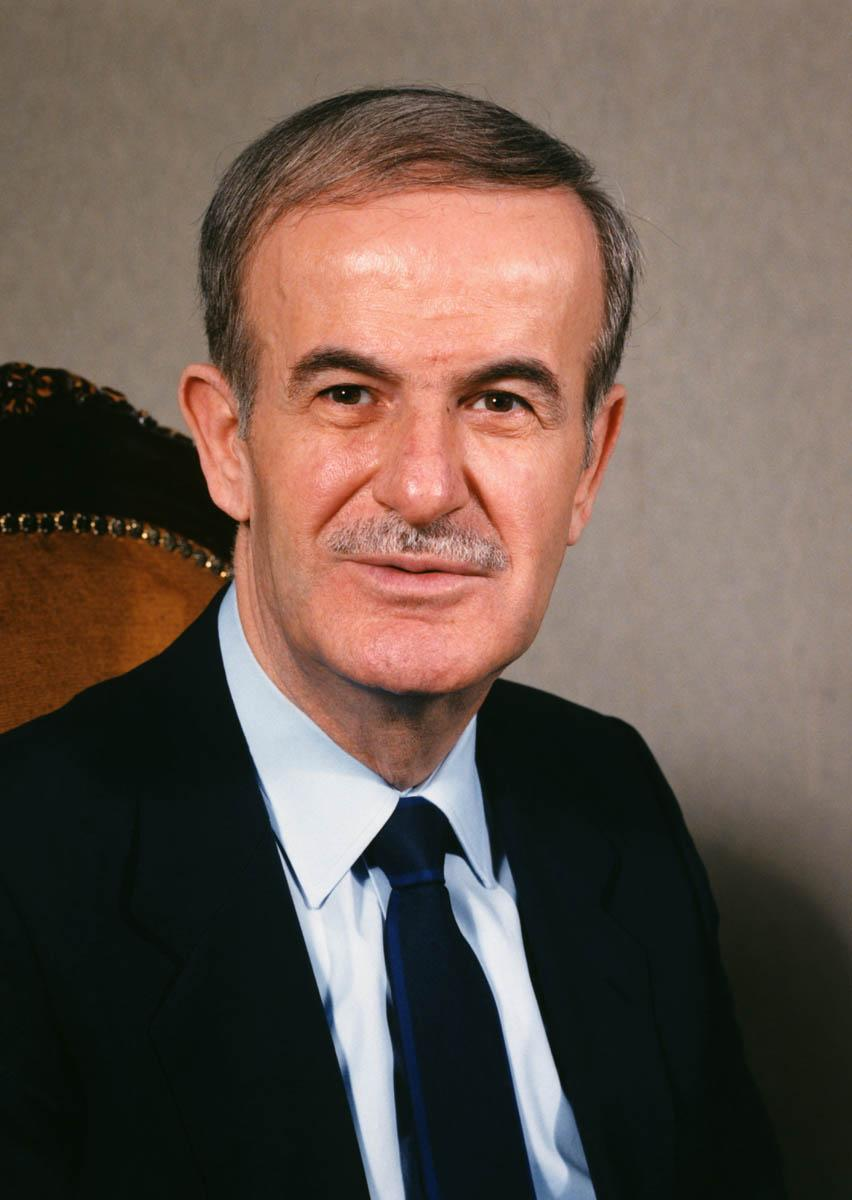
| | First party | Second party |
|---|---|---|
| | | IND |
| Leader | Hafez al-Assad | Independent politicians |
| Party | Ba'ath Party | Independents |
| Alliance | NPF |
| Last election | 130 | 35 |
| Seats won | 134 | 84 |
| Seat change | ▲4 | ▲49 |
Speaker before election
Abd al-Qadir Qaddura
Ba'ath Party
Elected Speaker
Abd al-Qadir Qaddura
Ba'ath Party

Parliamentary elections were held in Syria on 22 and 23 May 1990. No political parties were permitted outside the National Progressive Front, though candidates outside this group could run as independents. Approximately 9,000 candidates ran as independents. The result was a victory for the Ba'ath Party, which won 134 of the 250 seats. Voter turnout was 50%.

== Electoral system ==
Members were elected using the multiple non-transferable vote in fifteen districts.

== Results ==
| Party | Votes | % | Seats | +/– |
|---|---|---|---|---|
| Ba'ath Party | | | 134 | +4 |
| Arab Socialist Union Party | | | 8 | –1 |
| Syrian Communist Party | | | 8 | 0 |
| Socialist Unionist Party | | | 7 | –1 |
| Arab Socialist Movement | | | 5 | 0 |
| Democratic Socialist Unionist Party | | | 4 | New |
| Independents | | | 84 | +49 |
| Total | | | 250 | +55 |
| Total votes | 3,264,616 | – | | |
| Registered voters/turnout | 6,576,907 | 49.64 | | |
Source: Nohlen et al., IPU
