= Committees of the People's Assembly (Syria) =

Committees of the Syrian legislature

The committees of the People's Assembly of Syria are small groups of members who meet to scrutinise legislation, examine matters within a defined remit, and prepare business for the Assembly's plenary sessions. Committees have existed in Syrian legislatures, in varying numbers and forms. As of 2026 there are 26 permanent committees.

== Current legislature ==
=== Temporary committees ===
A 17-member temporary committee was formed on 17 July to draft the Assembly's rules of procedure. It began its work on 19 July and concluded on the evening of 23 July.

=== Permanent committees ===
Permanent committees are formed by decision of the Assembly, on the proposal of its Bureau, at the opening of each legislative term. Following Decision No. 109 of 2026, issued by Speaker Abdul Hamid al-Awak on 28 August 2026, there are 26 permanent committees.

- Affairs of Victims and Martyrs of the Revolution Committee (10 members)
- Agriculture and Food Security Committee (10 members)
- Budget and Accounts Committee (7 members)
- Communications, Digital Transformation and Information Technology Committee (7 members)
- Constitutional and Legislative Affairs Committee (16 members)
- Culture, Heritage and Cultural Diversity Committee (10 members)
- Defense, National Security and Emergency Committee (16 members)
- Diplomatic and Consular Affairs Committee (17 members)
- Economic Affairs Committee (14 members)
- Education Committee (10 members)
- Endowments, Religious Affairs and Fatwa Committee (12 members)
- Energy Committee (8 members)
- Family and Women's Affairs Committee (7 members)
- Financial Laws Committee (9 members)
- Health Committee (17 members)
- Higher Education and Scientific Research Committee (17 members)
- Investment, Reconstruction and Sustainable Development Committee (17 members)
- Local Administration and Development Committee (17 members)
- Media Committee (9 members)
- Public Freedoms and Human Rights Committee (15 members)
- Public Crossings and Customs Committee (9 members)
- Social Affairs and Labor Committee (14 members)
- Tourism Committee (8 members)
- Transitional Justice and Civil Peace Committee (16 members)
- Transport and Navigation Committee (7 members)
- Youth and Sports Committee (8 members)

=== Challenges ===
Commentators have identified several obstacles facing the newly formed committees, including a backlog of legal domains still awaiting regulation or operating under pre-2024 legislation; tension between government priorities and public demands, such as calls for a party law governing political life; the need for legal clarity in texts governing freedoms and expression to avoid room for misinterpretation; and the practical burden of reconciling multiple, independently drafted bills submitted by ministries, civil society organisations, and political movements.

== Constitutional committees ==
=== Constituent Assembly (1928–1930) ===
On 15 June 1928, the Constituent Assembly formed a Constitutional Committee, headed by Ibrahim Hananu, whose members included Fawzi al-Ghazzi, Saadallah al-Jabiri, Abd al-Rahman al-Kayyali, Lutfi al-Haffar, and Fares al-Khoury. The committee drafted a constitution reflecting the Assembly's nationalist demands, including full Syrian sovereignty, national unity, the creation of a national army, and expanded powers for an elected president.

=== Constituent Assembly (1949–1950) ===
The Constituent Assembly elected in 1949 formed a 33-member Constitution Committee, whose Bureau was elected on 4 January 1950, to draft what became the Syrian Constitution of 1950.

== Historical committees ==
=== 3rd Chamber of Deputies (1943–1947) ===
Ten committees were elected for the Chamber's first special session in August 1943, with an eleventh added in 1946:

- Budget Committee
- Constitution Committee
- Education Committee
- Endowments Committee (from 1946)
- Financial Laws Committee
- Foreign Affairs Committee
- Interior Committee
- Judicial Committee
- National Defense Committee
- National Economy Committee
- Petitions Committee

=== 4th Chamber of Deputies (1947–1949) ===
The Chamber initially renewed the same ten committees, adding five more over the course of the term:

- Budget Committee
- Constitution Committee
- Education Committee
- Endowments Committee
- Financial Laws Committee
- Foreign Affairs Committee
- Health and Social Affairs Committee (from 1948)
- Interior Committee
- Judicial Committee
- National Defense Committee
- National Economy Committee
- Personnel Committee (from 1948)
- Petitions Committee
- Rules of Procedure Committee (from 1948)
- Tribal Committee (from 1947)

=== 5th Chamber of Deputies (1950–1954) ===
- Agriculture Committee
- Budget Committee
- Constitution Committee
- Education Committee
- Financial Laws Committee
- Foreign Affairs Committee
- Health and Ambulance Committee
- Interior Committee
- Judicial Committee
- National Defense Committee
- National Economy Committee
- Petitions Committee
- Public Works and Transportation Committee

=== 6th Chamber of Deputies (1954–1958) ===
- Agriculture Committee
- Budget Committee
- Constitution Committee
- Education Committee
- Endowments Committee
- Financial Laws Committee
- Foreign Affairs Committee
- Health and Ambulance Committee
- Inspection and Accounts Committee (from 1957)
- Interior Committee
- Judicial Committee
- National Defense Committee
- National Economy Committee
- Petitions Committee
- Petroleum Committee (from 1955)
- Public Works and Transportation Committee
- Rules of Procedure Committee (temporary, 1954)
- Social Affairs and Labour Committee (from 1957)
- Tribes Committee

=== 1st and 2nd People's Assemblies (2012–2017) ===
Under the rules in force after the adoption of the 2012 Constitution, the Assembly formed its permanent committees at the start of each legislative term or in the October session of each year; the Assembly could establish further committees, and its Bureau could assign a committee new responsibilities when a ministry, department, or institution was created. Each committee was limited to a maximum of thirty members; a member had to sit on at least one committee but no more than two, and holding executive office was incompatible with committee membership.

Twelve permanent committees existed during this legislative term, with four more added during the sixth session of the first legislative term in 2012:

- Constitutional and Legislative Affairs Committee
- Budget and Accounts Committee
- Financial Laws Committee
- Arab and Foreign Affairs Committee
- Guidance and Information Committee
- Planning and Production Committee
- Services Committee
- National Security Committee
- Interior and Local Administration Committee
- Complaints and Petitions Committee
- Agriculture and Irrigation Committee
- Environment and Population Affairs Committee
- Public Freedoms and Human Rights Committee (from 2012)
- Women, Family and Child Rights Committee (from 2012)
- Youth Committee (from 2012)
- Press, Printing and Publishing Committee (from 2012)

=== 2nd–4th People's Assemblies (2017–2024) ===
In July 2017, the Assembly adopted a revised set of internal regulations restructuring its committee system. Standing committees were thereafter formed by Assembly decision, on the Bureau's proposal, at the start of each legislative term, and reformed again after each calendar year, remaining in place until reformed; the Assembly could also dissolve a committee that failed to perform its duties. Each committee was to have between ten and twenty members and, within ten days of its formation, elect a chair, vice-chair, and rapporteur from among its own members by absolute majority; two or more committees could meet jointly on a shared matter. The regulations named seventeen standing committees, several renamed, merged, or newly created from the 2012 structure:

- Constitutional and Legislative Affairs Committee
Constitutionality of bills; civil, administrative, and criminal legislation; the judiciary; removal of members' immunity; and amendments to the Assembly's internal regulations
- Budget and Accounts Committee
The state's general and supplementary budgets, and the budget closing accounts bill
- Financial Laws Committee
Matters concerning the Ministry of Finance
- Arab and Foreign Affairs and Expatriates Committee
Matters concerning the Ministry of Foreign Affairs and Expatriates
- Education, Higher Education and Scientific Research Committee
Matters concerning the Ministries of Education, Higher Education, and Culture, and the Endowments Ministry
- Economic Affairs and Energy Committee
Matters concerning the Ministries of Economy and Foreign Trade, Internal Trade and Consumer Protection, Industry, Electricity, and Oil and Mineral Resources
- Local Administration and Urban Development Committee
Matters concerning the Ministries of Local Administration and Environment, and Public Works and Housing
- Services Committee
Matters concerning the Ministries of Health, Transport, and Tourism
- National Security Committee
Matters concerning the Ministries of Defence and Interior
- Complaints and Oversight Committee
Complaints of administrative and financial corruption in state ministries and institutions, and citizens' complaints
- Agriculture and Water Resources Committee
Matters concerning the Ministries of Agriculture and Agrarian Reform, and Water Resources
- Public Freedoms and Human Rights Committee
Human rights and the public rights and freedoms guaranteed under the constitution
- Social Affairs Committee
Matters concerning the Ministries of Social Affairs and Labour, and Administrative Development
- Youth and Sports Committee
Development of young people's and athletes' capacities, and support for youth organisations
- Media, Communications and Information Technology Committee
Matters concerning the Ministries of Information, and Communications and Technology
- National Reconciliation Committee
Matters concerning the Ministry of State for National Reconciliation Affairs
- Martyrs' and War Victims' Affairs Committee
Affairs of martyrs' families; the war's wounded, sick, and disabled; and the missing and abducted

The 2017 restructuring dropped the standalone Environment and Population Affairs Committee, folding environmental matters into the Local Administration and Urban Development Committee, and replaced the Women, Family and Child Rights Committee with a broader Social Affairs Committee; a dedicated Family and Women's Affairs Committee did not reappear until the Assembly's reconstitution in 2026.

== See also ==
- People's Assembly of Syria
- List of terms of the Parliament of Syria
