= Arab Democratic Party =

Arab Democratic Party may refer to:

- Arab Democratic Party (Lebanon)
- Arab Democratic Party (Israel)
- Arab Democratic Nasserist Party
- Arabic Democratic Unionist Party
