= Safwan al-Qudsi =

Syrian politician (1940–2022)

- صفوان القدسي

Secretary General of Syrian Arab Socialist Union Party
- In office 1983–2022
- Succeeded by: Baria al-Qudsi

Minister of State of Syria
- In office 1978–1980

Personal details
- Born: 1940 Damascus, First Syrian Republic
- Died: October 28, 2022 (aged 81–82)
- Party: Syrian Arab Socialist Union Party
- Education: University of Damascus
- Occupation: Politician, writer

Safwan al-Qudsi (Arabic: صفوان القدسي; 1940 – 28 October 2022) was a Syrian politician and the Secretary General of the Syrian Arab Socialist Union Party. He was also a member of the central leadership of the National Progressive Front, a political alliance of parties which controls the Syrian legislature, and chairman of the Arab Parties Congress.

Safwan al-Qudsi received his bachelor's degree in philosophy from the University of Damascus. From 1972 to 1974 he was an assistant editor of the magazine Knowledge (Arabic: المعرفة) and chief editor from 1974 to 1978. From 1980 through 1981 he was editor-in-chief of Moral (Arabic: الأدبي), a literary magazine.

Safwan al-Qudsi was elected to the legislature in 1977, and served as Minister of State from 1978 to 1980. Since 1981 he was a member of the central leadership of the National Progressive Front. He has been the Secretary General of the ASU since 1984. He was a member of the Syrian Society for Research and Studies (Arabic: جمعية البحوث والدراسات).

In March 2000 Safwan al-Qudsi's wife, Bari'a al-Qudsi, was appointed Minister of Labor and Welfare, representing the ASU party in the cabinet. She lost the position in the December 2001 government reshuffle.

== Selected publications ==
- Qudsi, Safwan (1974) Siyasah al-musallahah: dirasat fi al-fikr al-siyasi al-muasir (Armed Policy Studies: Contemporary political thinking) Wizarat al-Thaqafaj wa-al-Irshad al-Qawmi, Damascus OCLC 23522692
- Qudsi, Safwan (1984) al-Batal wa-l-tarikh: Qira'a fi fikr Hafiz al-Asad al-siyasi (The Hero and History: A Reading of the Political Thought of Hafiz al-Asad) Ṭalas, Damascus OCLC 15252750
