= 1977 Syrian parliamentary election =

- 1–2 August 1977

All 250 seats to the Parliament of Syria 126 seats needed for a majority
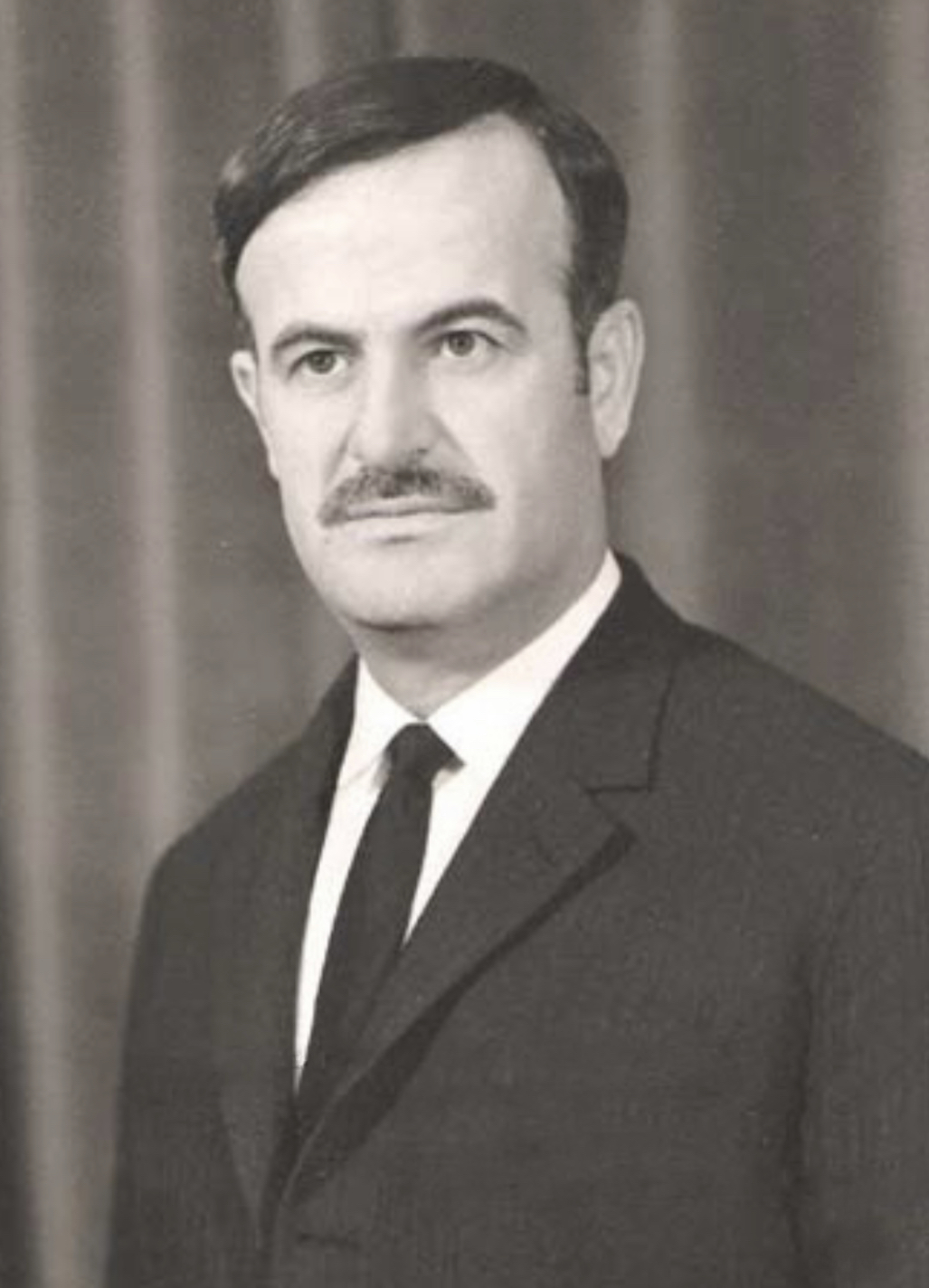
	First party	Second party
		IND
Leader	Hafez al-Assad	Independent politicians
Party	Ba'ath Party	Independents
Alliance	NPF
Last election	122	46
Seats won	125	46
Seat change	▲3	Steady
Speaker before election
Mohammad Ali al-Halabi
Ba'ath Party
Elected Speaker
Mohammad Ali al-Halabi
Ba'ath Party

Parliamentary elections were held in Syria on 1 and 2 August 1977. The result was a victory for the Arab Socialist Ba'ath Party, which won 125 of the 195 seats.

== Results ==
Party	Seats	+/–
Ba'ath Party	125	+3
Arab Socialist Union Party	10	+4
Syrian Communist Party	8	0
Arab Socialist Movement	3	0
Socialist Unionist Party	3	+2
Independents	46	0
Total	195	+9
Source: Nohlen et al.
