= 1981 Syrian parliamentary election =

- 9–10 November 1981

All 250 seats in the Parliament of Syria 126 seats needed for a majority
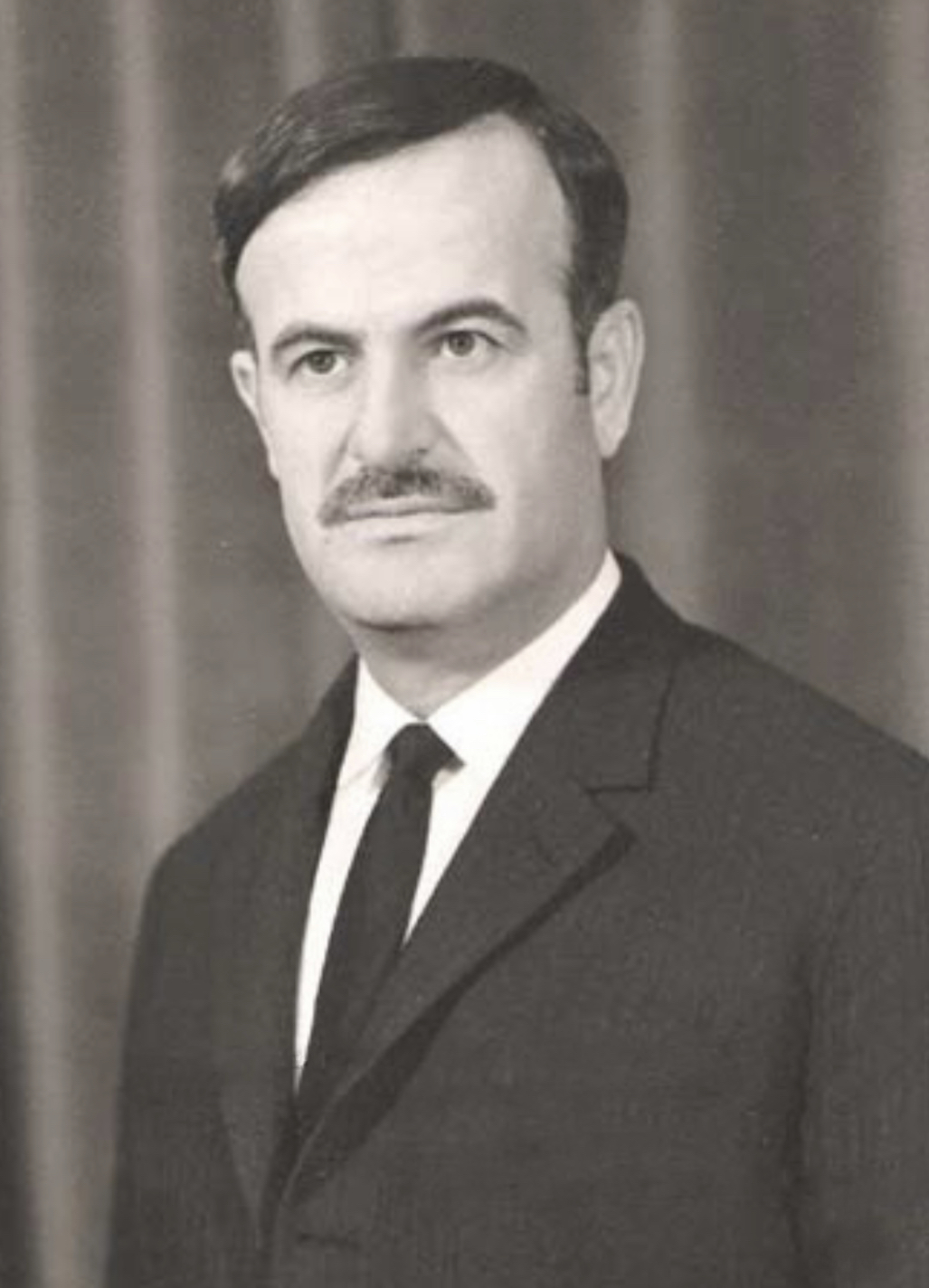
	First party	Second party
		IND
Leader	Hafez al-Assad	Independent politicians
Party	Ba'ath Party	Independents
Alliance	NPF
Last election	125	46
Seats won	127	46
Seat change	▲2	Steady
Speaker before election
Mahmoud Hadid
Ba'ath Party
Elected Speaker
Mahmoud Zuabi
Ba'ath Party

Parliamentary elections were held in Syria on 9 and 10 November 1981. The result was a victory for the Arab Socialist Ba'ath Party, which won 127 of the 195 seats.

== Results ==
Party	Seats	+/–
Ba'ath Party	127	+2
Arab Socialist Union Party	9	–1
Socialist Unionist Party	8	+5
Arab Socialist Movement	5	+2
Independents	46	0
Total	195	0
Source: Nohlen et al.
