= 1986 Syrian parliamentary election =

- 10–11 February 1986

All 250 seats in the Parliament of Syria 126 seats needed for a majority
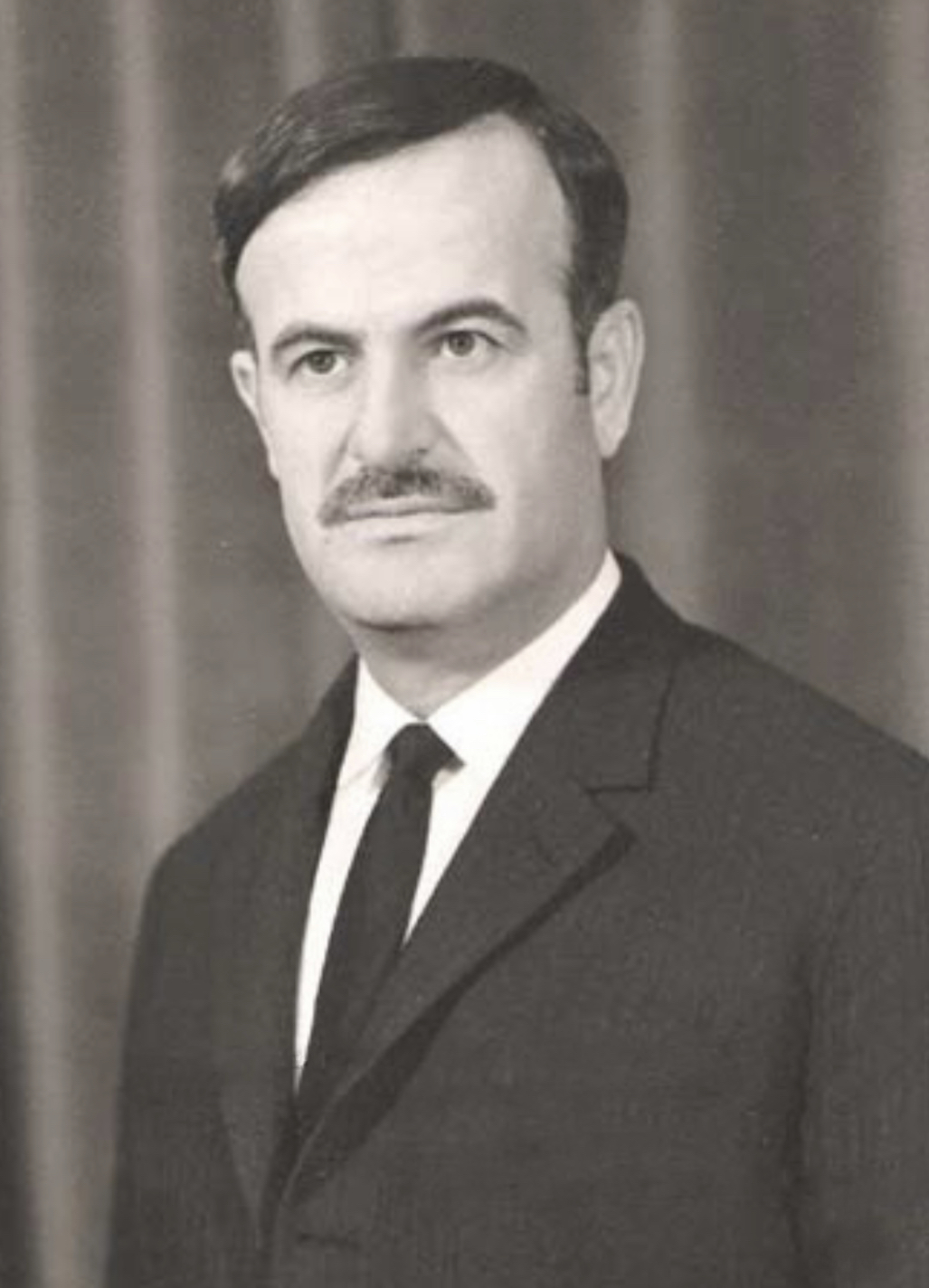
| | First party | Second party |
|---|---|---|
| | | IND |
| Leader | Hafez al-Assad | Independent politicians |
| Party | Ba'ath Party | Independents |
| Alliance | NPF |
| Last election | 127 | 46 |
| Seats won | 130 | 35 |
| Seat change | ▲3 | ▼11 |
Speaker before election
Mahmoud Zuabi
Ba'ath Party
Elected Speaker
Mahmoud Zuabi
Ba'ath Party

Parliamentary elections were held in Syria on 10 and 11 February 1986. Members were elected using the multiple non-transferable vote in fifteen constituencies, with an average district magnitude of thirteen. The result was a victory for the Arab Socialist Ba'ath Party, which won 130 of the 195 seats.

== Results ==
| Party | Seats | +/– |
|---|---|---|
| Ba'ath Party | 130 | +3 |
| Arab Socialist Union Party | 9 | 0 |
| Syrian Communist Party | 8 | New |
| Socialist Unionist Party | 8 | 0 |
| Arab Socialist Movement | 5 | 0 |
| Independents | 35 | –11 |
| Total | 195 | 0 |
Source: Nohlen et al.
