= 1973 Syrian parliamentary election =

- 25–26 May 1973

All 250 seats in the Parliament of Syria 126 seats needed for a majority
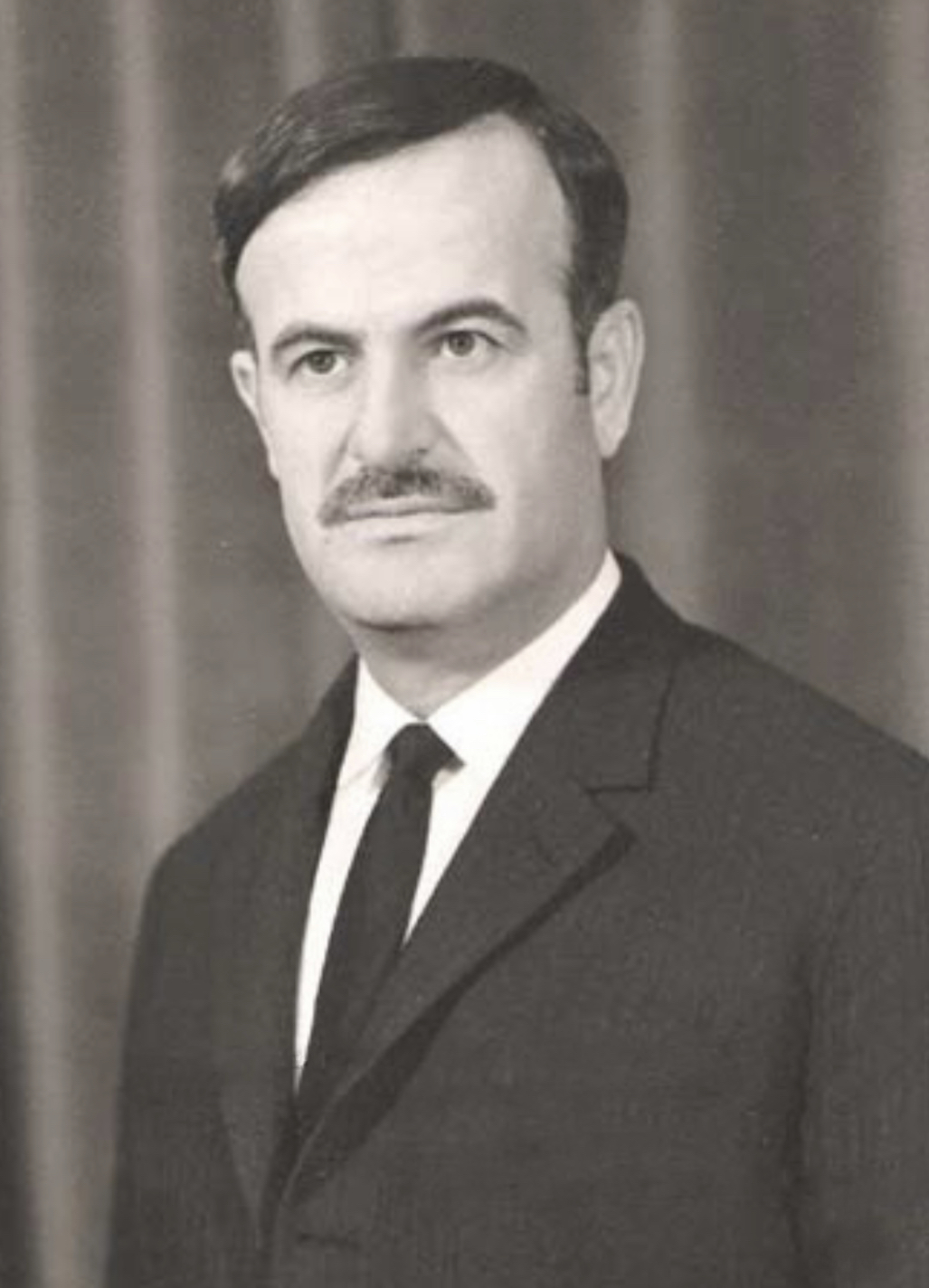
	First party	Second party
		IND
Leader	Hafez al-Assad	Independent politicians
Party	Ba'ath Party	Independents
Alliance	NPF
Last election	87	59
Seats won	122	46
Seat change	▲35	▼13
Speaker before election
Fahmi al-Yusufi
Ba'ath Party
Elected Speaker
Mohammad Ali al-Halabi
Ba'ath Party

Parliamentary elections were held in Syria on 25 and 26 May 1973. The result was a victory for the Arab Socialist Ba'ath Party, which won 122 of the 186 seats. They were also the first elections in which the Syrian-led Ba'ath Party ran for seats in parliament, with the original Arab Socialist Ba'ath Party having been dissolved in 1966.

== Results ==
Party	Seats
Ba'ath Party	122
Syrian Communist Party	8
Arab Socialist Union	6
Arab Socialist Movement	3
Socialist Unionist Party	1
Independents	46
Total	186
Source: Nohlen et al.
