= People's Assembly of Syria =

Unicameral legislature of Syria

Coordinates: 33°31′5″N 36°17′35″E

People's Assembly مجلس الشعب
- 22nd People's Assembly (Note: Also referred to as the Transitional People's Assembly.)

Type
- Type: Unicameral

History
- Founded: 1930; 96 years ago (as Chamber of Deputies) 2025; 1 year ago (current form)
- New session started: 12 July 2026; (122 days)

Leadership
- Speaker: Abdul Hamid al-Awak (I) since 12 July 2026
- First Deputy Speaker: Mustafa al-Mousa (I) since 12 July 2026
- Second Deputy Speaker: Madonna Bishara (I) since 12 July 2026
- Secretary: Mu'ayyad Habib (I) since 12 July 2026

Structure
- Seats: 210
- Political groups: De jure: Independent (205); Vacant (5) (Note: Three of the electoral districts that these seats represent are currently mostly under control of the Administrative Council of Jabal Bashan amidst the Druze insurgency in the region. Two seats are left vacant due to the death of Muhammad Mustafa Kaltoum and the resignation of Mudar Hamdan.)
- Political groups: De facto: Independent (171); Muslim Brotherhood (25) (Note: Not considered an official party designation within the People's Assembly.) (Note: Affiliated members); ENKS (6); KDPS (4); KDUP (1); KDEP (1); STA (1); ADO (1); MJDS (1); Vacant (5) (Note: Three of the electoral districts that these seats represent are currently mostly under control of the Administrative Council of Jabal Bashan amidst the Druze insurgency in the region. Two seats are left vacant due to the death of Muhammad Mustafa Kaltoum and the resignation of Mudar Hamdan.)
- Committees: 26: Affairs of Victims and Martyrs of the Revolution Committee; Agriculture and Food Security Committee; Budget and Accounts Committee; Communications, Digital Transformation and Information Technology Committee; Constitutional and Legislative Affairs Committee; Culture, Heritage and Cultural Diversity Committee; Defense, National Security and Emergency Committee; Diplomatic and Consular Affairs Committee; Economic Affairs Committee; Education Committee; Endowments, Religious Affairs and Fatwa Committee; Energy Committee; Family and Women's Affairs Committee; Financial Laws Committee; Health Committee; Higher Education and Scientific Research Committee; Investment, Reconstruction and Sustainable Development Committee; Local Administration and Development Committee; Media Committee; Public Freedoms and Human Rights Committee; Public Crossings and Customs Committee; Social Affairs and Labor Committee; Tourism Committee; Transitional Justice and Civil Peace Committee; Transport and Navigation Committee; Youth and Sports Committee
- Length of term: 30 months, renewable once
- Salary: US$1,500/month (US$18,000 per year) (Note: Not final amount; discussions are still underway regarding the salaries of People's Assembly members in the draft budget.)

Elections
- Voting system: Hierarchical voting (140 seats) (Note: Has been stated as temporary by official government sources.); Presidential appointment (70 seats) (Note: Has been stated as temporary by official government sources.)
- First election: 20 December 1931 – 5 January 1932 (mandatory period); 7 July – 18 July 1947 (post-independence)
- Last election: 5 October 2025 – 24 May 2026
- Redistricting: Higher Committee for People's Assembly Elections

Meeting place
- People's Assembly Building, Damascus, Syria

Constitution
- Constitutional Declaration of the Syrian Arab Republic

The People's Assembly (Arabic: مَجْلِس الشَّعْب, ALA-LC: Majlis ash-Shaʻb) is the unicameral legislative body of Syria. Currently, under the Syrian transitional government, the People's Assembly is composed of 210 members, each serving a renewable 30-month term. Of these, 119 of these members were elected in the 2025 Syrian parliamentary election through a temporary electoral college system, whilst 14 were elected in subsequent by-elections, with the remainder 70 being directly appointed by the President of Syria.

== History ==
=== French Mandate ===
After the fall of the Ottoman Empire in 1918, the Syrian National Congress was convened in May 1919 in Damascus. In September 1920, Henri Gouraud, High Commissioner of the Levant, formed a representative council, with two-thirds elected and one-third appointed by the French administration. On 28 June 1922, the Syrian Federation was established, creating a Federation Council of 15 members from various states. Due to the lack of elections, these members were appointed by the High Commissioner in 1923, and their terms were extended the following year.

In 1925, after the formation of the State of Syria, President Ahmad Nami and High Commissioner Henri Ponsot agreed to hold elections for a constituent assembly to draft a constitution. This led to the first Syrian legislative elections in 1928, which elected 68 representatives but was later disbanded on 5 February 1929. Article 30 of the 1930 Syrian constitution established a legislative authority known as the Chamber of Deputies, with representatives elected for four-year terms.

The first elections for the Chamber of Deputies were held in December 1931 and January 1932. The first council met in June 1932 and facilitated a compromise that led to Muhammad Ali Bey al-Abid's presidency. In the 1936 elections, the National Bloc won the majority of seats in the Chamber, and Hashim al-Atassi was elected president. Concurrently, negotiations with France led to the independence treaty, ratified by the Chamber of Deputies in December 1936. In 1938, Fares al-Khoury became the first Christian to be elected as President of the Chamber of Deputies.

=== Post-independence (1946–1962) ===
The first elections after independence were the 1947 parliamentary election, with the People's Party winning a plurality in the Chamber of Deputies, but no absolute majority. In 1949, a series of military coups led to the dissolution of the Chamber of Deputies and constitutional suspensions. A Constituent Assembly elected in 1949 drafted the 1950 constitution, which strengthened parliamentary powers.

Adib al-Shishakli's 1951 coup dissolved the Chamber of Deputies, and his 1953 election, with only 16% voter turnout, reconstituted the Chamber of Deputies as a 82-member legislative body under a presidential system. After his ouster in 1954, parliamentary rule was restored, with the People's Party and Ba'ath Party gaining influence.

In 1958, the Chamber of Deputies was replaced by the UAR's National Assembly, where Syrians held one-third of the seats. Following Syria's withdrawal, the 1961 election restored parliamentary democracy.

=== Ba'athist rule (1963–2024) ===
Following the 1963 coup, the People's Assembly largely served as a rubber stamp for the ruling Ba'athists. Only parties affiliated with the National Progressive Front could participate in elections.

The 2012 elections, held on 7 May, resulted in a new parliament that, for the first time in four decades, was nominally based on a multi-party system. The opposition was represented by the Popular Front for Change and Liberation, which won six seats. It later boycotted the 2016 elections as the government had not upheld its pledges to seek constitutional amendments and pursue political negotiations.

In 2016, Hadiya Khalaf Abbas, whom had represented Deir ez-Zor since 2003, became the first woman elected to be the Speaker, whilst in 2017, Hammouda Sabbagh became the first Syriac Orthodox Christian to have held the post.

=== Syrian transitional government (2024–present) ===
Following the fall of the Assad regime on 8 December 2024, the People's Assembly published a statement calling that day a "historic day in the lives of all Syrians", stating that it would work towards ensuring the upholding of the rule of law without discrimination. The statement included the new coat of arms of Syria, adorned with the flag of the Syrian opposition.

On 11 December, the Ba'ath Party indefinitely halted all activities. The following day, the Syrian caretaker government suspended the assembly and constitution for a three-month transitional period. The People's Assembly was dissolved on 29 January 2025 when plans to establish an interim legislative council were announced by the Syrian transitional government. Following the adoption of the Constitutional Declaration of the Syrian Arab Republic, a provisional parliament called the "People's Assembly" was established to serve as the interim parliament during the five-year transition, overseeing the drafting of a new permanent constitution. The president selects one-third of the People's Assembly members, with the remaining two-thirds being elected through commissions supervised by a committee designated by the president.

A presidential decree issued on 2 June 2025 established the Higher Committee for People's Assembly Elections. The 11-member committee is responsible for overseeing the formation of electoral sub-committees, which will elect two-thirds of the members of the People's Assembly.

On 5 October, the 2025 Syrian parliamentary election was held in the temporary electoral system as an indirect vote, where only around 6,000 selected Syrians were eligible. 140 members were due to be elected by the electoral college, although only 119 were elected on election day due to postponement in select areas from security concerns. On 1 July, President Ahmed al-Sharaa appointed the remaining 70 additional members.

The People's Assembly building underwent renovation by late 2025, the first since 2009, delaying the appointment of the 70 seats appointed by the president of Syria.

While in at a meeting in the Royal Institute of International Affairs on 31 March 2026, al-Sharaa announced that the People's Assembly will be seated within the month. The first post-Assad People's Assembly was subsequently finalized in early July 2026, with its inaugural session originally scheduled for 6 July; however, a day before the scheduled date, the Higher Committee for People's Assembly Elections had announced that the inaugural session will be postponed to a later date. The inaugural session of the People's Assembly was held on 12 July 2026.

At its second session, the Assembly passed a resolution setting up much of its internal procedures and structure; among the articles were provisions that the parliament cannot be dissolved by the President, must ratify international agreements and constitutional amendments, will broadcast its sessions publicly, and retains parliamentary immunity for its members only for when conducting parliamentary affairs.

== Committees of the People's Assembly ==
Within the People's Assembly, there are several committees responsible for discussing and approving legislation proposed by the People's Assembly regarding a specific field related to these committees. These committees were formed by a 17-member special committee formed by People's Assembly speaker Abdul Hamid al-Awak, and is responsible with drafting laws regarding the internal regulations of the People's Assembly, such as the formation and election of committees, and holding sessions of the People's Assembly.

In total, there are currently 26 committees of the People's Assembly; these committees were formed on 30 July 2026, after the second session of the 22nd People's Assembly.

=== Special committees ===
- Internal Regulation Drafting Committee

=== Permanent committees ===
==== Media, social, internal and foreign affairs ====
- Defense, National Security and Emergency Committee
- Diplomatic and Consular Affairs Committee
- Public Freedoms and Human Rights Committee
- Media Committee
- Social Affairs and Labor Committee
- Youth and Sports Committee
- Family and Women Committee
- Endowments, Religious Affairs and Fatwa Committee

==== Legislative and finance ====
- Constitutional and Legislative Affairs Committee
- Budget and Accounts Committee
- Financial Laws Committee
- Economic Affairs Committee

==== Service and development ====
- Education Committee
- Higher Education and Scientific Research Committee
- Health Committee
- Agriculture and Food Security Committee
- Energy Committee
- Transport and Navigation Committee
- Tourism Committee
- Culture Committee
- Heritage and Cultural Diversity Committee

==== Administration, economy and technology ====
- Local Administration and Development Committee
- Investment, Reconstruction and Sustainable Development Committee
- Public Ports and Customs Committee
- Communications, Digital Transformation and Information Technology Committee

== Sectarian representation ==
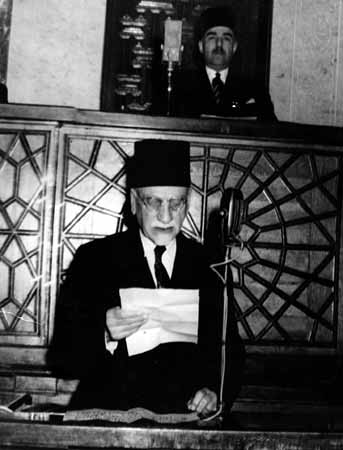
Hashim al-Atassi announced as the president of Syria after a unanimous vote in the Chamber of Deputies, the predecessor of the People's Assembly, in December 1949.

The representation of various sects in the Syrian parliament has evolved over time, influenced by both formal allocations and informal practices. The 1930 constitution mandated fair representation for religious minorities in both parliament and top government positions, similar to Lebanon's current confessional allocation system. This allocation continued until 1949, when it was abolished by Husni al-Za'im. The 1950 constitution further eliminated sectarian seat allocations, though it maintained reserved seats for non-Muslims, such as Christians and Jews who had at least one representative in the 1920s, as well as for nomadic Bedouins. Notably, seats designated for Bedouins were filled by tribal leaders rather than through elections.

Syrian Yazidis, which number around 13,000 people at the time, were entirely excluded from parliamentary representation as the Syrian state did not recognize their faith, classifying them as Sunni Muslims. Furthermore, Kurdish political representation in Syria was limited due to the denial of citizenship to many Kurds, particularly following the 1962 census.

Under Ba'athist rule from 1971 until 2024, the Ba'ath Party dominated the political landscape. While the 1973 constitution did not specify sectarian quotas, the Ba'athist-led regime maintained a balance to ensure representation of key groups. According to data from 2024, the 250 seats in the People's Council are distributed as follows: Sunni Muslims (171 seats), reflecting their majority status in Syria's population, Alawites (39 seats), corresponding to their demographic proportion, Christians (23 seats), allocated across various provinces, Druze (9 seats), with a significant number from the Suwayda Governorate, Shia Muslims (5 seats), Ismailis (2 seats) and Murshidites (1 seat).

Out of a 210-member People's Assembly formed after the fall of the Ba'athist government in 2024, 140 seats were allocated through a transitional electoral process. Of those elected, six were women and 10 were minority representatives (Kurds, Christians, and two Alawites). The 70 appointed members included 15 women, with officials stating the appointments were intended to address limited representation in the elected portion of the assembly.

== Latest election ==
Graph of the party split among 210 seats.
Party or alliance		Votes	%	Seats	+/–
Independents				171	+104
Kurdish National Council	Kurdistan Democratic Party of Syria			4	New
Kurdish National Council	Kurdistan Democratic Unity Party			1	New
Kurdish National Council	Kurdish Democratic Equality Party in Syria			1	New
Muslim Brotherhood				25	+25
Syrian Turkmen Assembly				1	New
Movement for Justice and Development in Syria				1	New
Assyrian Democratic Organization				1	New
Vacant				5	+1
Total				210	–40
Total votes		6,000	–		
Registered voters/turnout		6,000	100.00		

== Historical composition ==
=== Arab Kingdom of Syria ===
Election	No.	Total seats	Composition
Progress / Democratic / Independent
Syrian National Congress
1919	—	120	65 / 35 / 20

=== Mandatory and Republican Syria ===
Election	No.	Total seats	Composition
Communist / Ba'ath / Socialist Cooperation / Arab Liberation Movement / National Party / People's Party / Muslim Brotherhood / SSNP / Ind.
Constituent Assembly (1928–1929)
1928	—	58	
Chamber of Deputies
1931–32	1st	67	
1936	2nd	80	
1943	3rd	124	
1947	4th	130	24 / 53 / 53
Constituent Assembly (1949–1950) / Chamber of Deputies
1949	—/5th	114	1 / 13 / 63 / 4 / 1 / 32
Chamber of Deputies
1953	6th	83	72 / 1 / 10
1954	7th	140	1 / 22 / 2 / 2 / 19 / 30 / 2 / 62
Constituent and Parliamentary Assembly
1961	–	172	20 / 4 / 21 / 33 / 10 / 84

=== Ba'athist Syria ===
Election	No.	Total seats	Composition
Communist / Communist (Bakdash) / Communist (Unified) / Dem. Socialist Unionist / Arab Dem. Union / Socialist Unionist / Arab Socialist Union / Arab Socialist Movement / National Covenant / Ba'ath / SSNP / People's Will / Independent
National Revolutionary Council
1965	—	95	
1966	—	134	
People's Assembly
1971	8th	173	8 / 4 / 11 / 4 / 87 / 59
1973	9th	186	8 / 1 / 6 / 3 / 122 / 46
1977	10th	195	8 / 3 / 10 / 3 / 125 / 46
1981	11th	195	8 / 9 / 5 / 127 / 46
1986	12th	195	8 / 3 / 10 / 3 / 130 / 35
1990	13th	250	8 / 4 / 7 / 8 / 5 / 134 / 84
1994	14th	250	8 / 4 / 2 / 7 / 7 / 4 / 135 / 83
1998	15th	250	8 / 4 / 2 / 7 / 7 / 4 / 135 / 83
2003	16th	250	8 / 4 / 7 / 7 / 4 / 2 / 135 / 83
2007	17th	250	5 / 3 / 4 / 1 / 6 / 8 / 3 / 3 / 134 / 2 / 81
2012	18th	250	8 / 3 / 18 / 2 / 3 / 134 / 4 / 1 / 77
2016	19th	250	3 / 1 / 2 / 2 / 1 / 172 / 7 / 62
2020	20th	250	3 / 1 / 1 / 1 / 2 / 3 / 2 / 167 / 3 / 67
2024	21st	250	2 / 2 / 1 / 2 / 2 / 2 / 2 / 169 / 3 / 65

=== Syrian transitional government ===
KDPS / KDUP / KDEP / ADO / MJDS / STA / MBS / Independent / Vacant
Election	No.	Total seats	Composition
2025	22nd	210	170 / 25 / 4 / 3 / 1 / 1 / 1 / 1 / 4; 205 / 5

== See also ==
- Speaker of the People's Assembly of Syria
- Politics of Syria

== Sources ==
- Alhakim, Youssef (1983). Syria and the French Mandate (in Arabic). Beirut: Dar Al-Nahar.
- Bishour, Wadi' (1994). Syria: The Making of a State and the Birth of a Nation (in Arabic) (1st ed.). Damascus, Syria: Dar Al-Yaziji.
- Haddad, Ghassan Mohammed Rashad (2007). Shami Papers: Contemporary Syrian History 1946-1966 (in Arabic). Madbouly Library. ISBN 9789772086276. Archived from the original on 10 August 2020.
- Torrey, Gordon (1964). Syrian Politics and the Military, 1945-1958. Ohio State University Press. Archived from the original on 10 August 2020.
