= Constituent Assembly (Syria, 1928–1929) =

Constituent Assembly الجمعية التأسيسية

Type
- Type: Constituent assembly of State of Syria

History
- Founded: 9 June 1928
- Disbanded: 5 February 1929 (Note: The Constituent Assembly was suspended on 11 August 1928, but later reconvened on 5 February 1929, which turned out to be its final sitting. However, the Assembly was not formally dissolved until 5 May 1929.)
- Succeeded by: Chamber of Deputies

Leadership
- Speaker: Hashim al-Atassi (National Bloc)
- Seats: 68

Elections
- First election: 1928

Meeting place
- Dar al-Abid, Damascus

The Constituent Assembly (Arabic: الجمعية التأسيسية, romanized: al-Jamʻīyah al-Taʼsīsīyah) was a unicameral parliament of the State of Syria established in 1928 under the French Mandate for Syria and the Lebanon. It was tasked with drafting a constitution for an independent Syrian republic.

The Assembly was elected by indirect elections in two rounds on 10 and 24 April 1928, marking the beginning of organised parliamentary political life under the mandate. It first convened on 9 June 1928 and was dominated by the National Bloc, led by Hashim al-Atassi.

Although the Assembly successfully drafted a constitution in August 1928, it was suspended by the French High Commissioner Henri Ponsot and ultimately dissolved in 1929 after a prolonged political deadlock.

It was the first elected constituent body in Syria under the French Mandate and played a central role in the development of the Syrian constitutional system.

== Background ==
Following increased nationalist activity after the Great Syrian Revolt (1925–1927), political leaders in Syria pushed for the creation of a representative body to negotiate independence and end French military rule.

In February 1928, the government of Ahmad Nami was replaced by a cabinet headed by Taj al-Din al-Hasani, tasked with organising elections for a constituent assembly under the supervision of the French authorities.

The elections were held in April 1928, with candidates affiliated with the National Bloc and other nationalist groups securing a majority of seats across most regions

== Bureau ==
The Bureau of the Constituent Assembly was elected during the first session. It consisted of

| Position | Name | Party | Tenure |
|---|---|---|---|
| Speaker | Hashim al-Atassi | National Bloc | 9 June 1928 – 5 May 1929 |
| Deputy Speaker | Fawzi al-Ghazzi | National Bloc | 9 June 1928 – 5 May 1929 |
| Deputy Speaker | Fathallah Asyun | National Bloc | 9 June 1928 – 5 May 1929 |
| Secretary | Ahmad al-Rifai | National Bloc | 9 June 1928 – 5 May 1929 |
| Secretary | Fayez al-Khoury | National Bloc | 9 June 1928 – 5 May 1929 |
| Overseer | Saadallah al-Jabiri | National Bloc | 9 June 1928 – 5 May 1929 |
| Overseer | Niqula Khanji | National Bloc | 9 June 1928 – 5 May 1929 |
| Overseer | Fakhri al-Baroudi | National Bloc | 9 June 1928 – 5 May 1929 |

Election of the Speaker of the Constituent Assembly
| Candidate | Party | Votes | % |
|---|---|---|---|
| Hashim al-Atassi | National Bloc | 48 | 72.7 |
| Muhammad Al Yahya | | 18 | 27.2 |
| Required majority | | 35 votes | Majority |
| Valid votes | | 66 | 97.1 |
| Blank and invalid votes | | 2 | 2.9 |
| Total | | 68 | 100 |
| Registered voters / turnout | | 68 | 100 |

== Composition and sessions ==
The Assembly consisted of 68 members and represented various political currents, including: National Bloc, independence-oriented nationalist figures, and other political societies such as the Arab Independence Party and moderate reformist groups.

The Assembly convened in two sessions:

- 1st: 9 June 1928 – 11 August 1928
- 2nd: 5 February 1929

== Drafting of the constitution ==
On 15 June 1928, the Assembly formed a 33-member constitutional committee headed by Ibrahim Hananu. The committee included prominent nationalist figures such as Fawzi al-Ghazzi, Saadallah al-Jabiri, Abd al-Rahman al-Kayyali, Lutfi al-Haffar, Fares al-Khoury, and others.

The committee drafted a constitution reflecting key nationalist demands, including: full Syrian sovereignty, national unity, creation of a national army, and expanded powers for an elected president.

The draft constitution was approved by the Assembly in August 1928 after approximately fifteen sittings held between June and August.

== French intervention and suspension ==
The draft constitution was rejected by the French High Commissioner, Henri Ponsot, who argued that several provisions violated the terms of the mandate, and demanded the removal of multiple articles.

On 9 August 1928, Ponsot issued an ultimatum requiring the Assembly to amend or remove these provisions. The Assembly refused to comply during its meeting of 11 August 1928.

As a result, the French authorities suspended the Assembly for three months.

== Dissolution and aftermath ==
The Assembly was called to convene again on 5 February 1929. When the Assembly still refused to comply with Ponsot's demand, it was suspended another time, and formally dissolved in May later that year.

In May 1930, the French authorities promulgated a revised version of the constitution originally drafted in 1928, after introducing amendments that limited Syrian sovereignty, including provisions requiring approval of laws by the High Commissioner.

Despite these limitations, the constitution established a parliamentary system and a separation of powers with an independent judiciary.

It remained in force until 1949 and marked the foundation of Syria's first republican constitutional order.

== See also ==
- Syrian National Congress
- Syrian Constitution of 1930
- Constituent Assembly (Syria, 1949–1950)
- Constituent and Parliamentary Assembly
