= Social Democratic Unionists =

Social Democratic Unionists الوحدويون الديمقراطيون الاجتماعيون
- Banned: 29 January 2025; 17 months ago
- Headquarters: Damascus, Syria
- Ideology: Social democracy Labourism
- National affiliation: National Progressive Front (until 2024)

The Social Democratic Unionists (Arabic: الوحدويون الديمقراطيون الاجتماعيون - al-Wahdawiuyun al-Dimukatiyyun Al-Ijtima'iyyun) was a political party in Syria.

Controlled by the government, it was part of the National Progressive Front (NPF) of legally licensed parties which supported the government's socialist and Arab nationalist orientation and accepted the leadership of the Ba'ath Party. Following the fall of the Assad regime, the party along with the NPF was dissolved by the Syrian transitional government on 29 January 2025.
