= General Union of Peasants =

Farming industry association in Syria

- الاتحاد العام للفلاحين; Alâtehad Al'am Llâflâhin
- Founded: 1964
- Dissolved: 29 January 2025; 21 months ago
- Headquarters: Damascus, Syria
- Location: Syria
- Key people: Ahmed Saleh Ibrahim, Secretary General
- Affiliations: National Progressive Front
- Website: http://www.alfalahen.org.sy/

The General Union of Peasants (GUP; Arabic: الاتحاد العام للفلاحين) was the sole organisation/industry association for farmers in Ba'athist Syria. Founded in 1964, the Union was formed from numerous agricultural cooperatives that had been active in Syria since 1943.

The Union distributed a magazine relating to the activities and goals of the union, this magazine is called "The Journal of the Struggle of the Peasants".

The union was closely linked with the ruling Arab Socialist Ba'ath Party and was a member of the National Progressive Front. In 2018 the union held a ceremony to celebrate the 54th anniversary of its establishment in Damascus. In the ceremony, Secretary General Ahmed Saleh Ibrahim further emphasized loyalty to the Syrian government. Numerous high-ranking members of the ruling Ba'ath party attended the ceremony.

Following the fall of the Assad regime, the GUP was dissolved by the Syrian transitional government on 29 January 2025.
