= Ministry of Social Affairs and Labor =

Ministry of Social Affairs and Labor may refer to:

- Ministry of Social Affairs and Labor (Haiti)
- Ministry of Social Affairs and Labor (Syria)
- Ministry of Social Affairs and Labour (Yemen)
