= Mahmoud al-Abrash =

Syrian politician

- محمود الأبرش
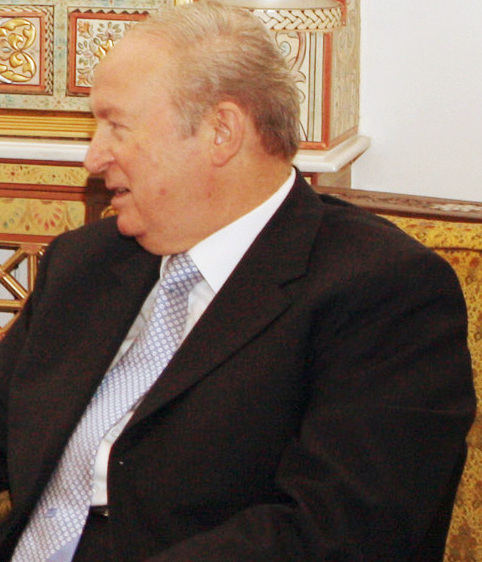
- al-Abrash in 2010

Speaker of the People's Assembly of Syria
- In office 7 October 2003 – 24 May 2012
- Preceded by: Muhammad Naji al-Otari
- Succeeded by: Mohammad Jihad al-Laham

Personal details
- Born: 1944 (age 81–82) Damascus, Syria
- Party: Ba'ath Party

Mahmoud al-Abrash or Mahmoud el-Abrache (Arabic: محمود الأبرش) (born 1944) is a Syrian politician.

== Career ==
He was originally an engineer in public works. He then left his job to engage in politics and became a member of the Baath party. He chaired the parliamentary Committee on International Affairs of the Arab people.

On October 7, 2003 he became Syrian speaker of parliament following the appointment of Muhammad Naji al-Otari as prime minister. His first term ended on March 8, 2007 but he was re-elected again on May 7, 2007.

He is also a member of the Provisional Arab Parliament.
