= Maria Saadeh =

Syrian architect, politician, and developer (born 1974)

- ماريا سعادة
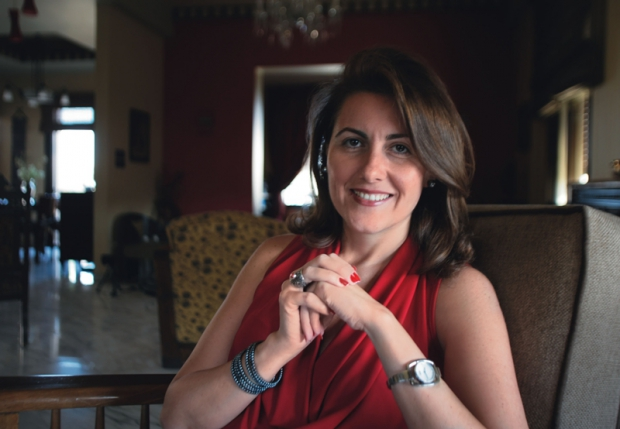
- Saadeh in 2015

Member of the People's Assembly
- In office 24 May 2012 – 6 June 2016
- Constituency: Damascus Governorate

Personal details
- Born: 16 July 1974 (age 51) Damascus, Syria
- Party: Independent
- Spouse: Antoine Lakah (m. 2002)
- Children: 2
- Education: Aleppo University (BA); University of Tripoli Lebanon (DESS)
- Occupation: Consultant architect; conceptual designer; business developer; politician; designer

Maria Saadeh (Arabic: ماريا سعادة, romanized: Māriyā Saʿādah; born 16 July 1974) is a Syrian architect, politician, and developer who served as an independent member of the People's Assembly from 2012 to 2016. She has worked as a creative designer in the fields of urban planning, building restoration, and tourism development.

== Career ==
Saadeh was born in Damascus, Syria. Her father died in 1980, when she was aged 6.

She earned a diploma in Architecture from the University of Aleppo in 1997. In 1998, she obtained a diploma in Architectural Design, with a specialization in the historical development of Syrian church architecture. The following year, she received a DESS in Conservation and Restoration of Old Monuments and Sites from the École de Chaillot in Paris and the University of Tripoli Lebanon.

In 1999–2000, Saadeh founded PAA, an architectural firm specializing in interior design and restoration and conservation studies. From 2001 to 2011, she taught architectural design at the University of Damascus. Between 2006 and 2010, she pursued doctoral studies at the University of Geneva on contemporary interventions in historical monuments and sites. She has worked as an expert in restoration and conservation and has received several local and international awards in architecture and design.

In the 2012 Syrian parliamentary election, Saadeh was elected as an independent member of the People's Assembly, serving from 2012 to 2016. She is a Melkite Greek Catholic and appealed to Pope Francis and the international community for the protection of Christian communities in Syria, stating, "We need to ask all countries to stop violence and war. We call on the United States not to promote a military action, because it is illegal and the whole world recognizes it." In February 2018 she was interviewed by Channel 4 in the United Kingdom regarding the Siege of Eastern Ghouta.

In 2020, Saadeh founded Houna Hawyati, a nonprofit association for social development focused on promoting Syrian identity through cultural, economic, and social initiatives.
