= Speaker of the People's Assembly of Syria =

Presiding officer of Syria's legislature

Speaker of the People's Assembly
- رئيس مجلس الشعب السوري
- Emblem of Syria

- Flag of Syria
- Incumbent; Abdul Hamid al-Awak since 12 July 2026
- People's Assembly
- Style: Mr. Speaker (informal)
- Status: Presiding officer
- Member of: People's Assembly of Syria
- Seat: People's Assembly building, Damascus, Syria
- Appointer: People's Assembly of Syria
- Term length: At the president's pleasure
- Inaugural holder: Ahmad al-Khatib (modern incarnation); Abdul Hamid al-Awak (current form)
- Formation: 22 February 1971 (modern incarnation); 12 July 2026 (current form)
- Deputy: Deputy Speakers

The Speaker of the People's Assembly (Arabic: رئيس مجلس الشعب, romanized: Raʼīs Majlis ash-Shaʻb, lit. 'president of the People's Assembly') is the presiding officer of the People's Assembly, the unicameral legislature of Syria. The current Speaker of the People’s Assembly is Abdul Hamid al-Awak, a member of the Assembly since 1 July 2026 following his election by the People's Assembly.

== List of officeholders ==
=== Syria under the Occupied Enemy Territory Administration (1917–1920) === ==== President of the Syrian National Congress (1919–1920) ====
No.	Portrait	Name (Birth–Death)	Term of office		Political party	Term	Convocation
1		Hashim al-Atassi (1875–1960)	11 December 1919	17 July 1920	National Bloc	1 (1919)	1st convocation (1919–1920)
2		Rashid Rida (1865–1935)	1920	1920	Independent	1 (1920)	2nd convocation (1919–1920)
=== State of Syria, part of the French Mandate (1922–1930) === ==== Speaker of the Constituent Council (1923–1925) ====
No.	Portrait	Name (Birth–Death)	Term of office		Political party	Term	Convocation
1		Badih Muayyad al-Azm (1870–1960)	12 November 1923	14 July 1925	Independent	1 (1923)	1st convocation (1923–1928)
==== Speaker of the Constituent Assembly (1924–1930) ====
No.	Portrait	Name (Birth–Death)	Term of office		Political party	Term	Convocation
1		Hashim al-Atassi (1875–1960)	11 August 1928	6 September 1928	National Bloc	1 (1928)	1st convocation (1928)
=== Syrian Republic (1930–1946) === ==== Chairman of the Council of Representatives (1932–1933) ====
No.	Portrait	Name (Birth–Death)	Term of office		Political party	Term	Convocation
1		Barakat al-Khaldi	7 June 1932	25 November 1933	Independent	1 (1932)	1st convocation (1932–1933)
==== President of the Chamber of Deputies (1932–1946) ====
No.	Portrait	Name (Birth–Death)	Term of office		Political party	Term	Convocation
1		Subhi Barakat (1889–1939)	January 1932	1932	Independent	1 (1932)	2nd convocation (1932–1936)
2		Fares al-Khoury (1877–1962)	21 November 1936	8 July 1939	National Bloc	1 (1936)	3rd convocation (1936–1943)
Vacant (1939–1943)
2		Fares al-Khoury (1877–1962)	17 August 1943	17 October 1944	National Bloc	2 (1943)	4th convocation (1943–1947)
3		Saadallah al-Jabiri (1893–1947)	17 October 1944	15 September 1945	National Bloc	1 (1943)	4th convocation (1943–1947)
2		Fares al-Khoury (1877–1962)	16 September 1945	22 October 1946	National Bloc	1 (1943)	4th convocation (1943–1947)
=== Syrian Republic (1946–1958) === ==== Speaker of the House of Representatives (1947–1949) ====
No.	Portrait	Name (Birth–Death)	Term of office		Political party	Term	Convocation
2		Fares al-Khoury (1877–1962)	27 September 1947	31 March 1949	National Bloc	2 (1947)	5th convocation (1947–1949)
2		Fares al-Khoury (1877–1962)	27 September 1947	31 March 1949	People's Party	2 (1947)	5th convocation (1947–1949)
==== Speaker of the Constituent Assembly (1949–1951) ====
No.	Portrait	Name (Birth–Death)	Term of office		Political party	Term	Convocation
4		Rushdi al-Kikhya (1899–1987)	12 December 1949	22 June 1951	People's Party	1 (1949)	6th convocation (1949–1953)
5		Maarouf al-Dawalibi (1909–2004)	23 June 1951	30 September 1951	People's Party	1 (1949)	6th convocation (1949–1953)
6		Nazim al-Qudsi (1906–1998)	1 October 1951	2 December 1951	People's Party	1 (1949)	6th convocation (1949–1953)
==== President of the Chamber of Deputies (1953–1954) ====
No.	Portrait	Name (Birth–Death)	Term of office		Political party	Term	Convocation
7		Maamun al-Kuzbari (1914–1998)	24 October 1953	2 December 1954	Independent	1 (1953)	7th convocation (1953–1954)
==== President of the Chamber of Deputies (1954–1958) ====
No.	Portrait	Name (Birth–Death)	Term of office		Political party	Term	Convocation
6		Nazim al-Qudsi (1906–1998)	14 October 1954	1 October 1957	People's Party	1 (1954)	8th convocation (1954–1958)
8		Akram al-Hawrani (1912–1996)	14 October 1957	22 February 1958	Ba'ath Party (Syria Region)	1 (1954)	8th convocation (1954–1958)
=== United Arab Republic (1958–1961) === ==== President of the Chamber of Deputies (1958–1960) ====
No.	Portrait	Name (Birth–Death)	Term of office		Political party	Term	Convocation
1		Akram al-Hawrani (1912–1996)	22 February 1958	20 July 1960	Ba'ath Party (Syria Region)	1 (1954)	8th convocation (1954–1958)
==== Chairman of the Council of Nation (1960–1961) ====
No.	Portrait	Name (Birth–Death)	Term of office		Political party	Term	Convocation
1		Anwar Sadat (1918–1981)	21 July 1960	17 September 1961	National Union	1 (1960)	1st convocation (1960–1961)
=== Syrian Arab Republic (1961–2024) === ==== President of the Chamber of Deputies (1961–1963) ====
No.	Portrait	Name (Birth–Death)	Term of office		Political party	Term	Convocation
7		Maamun al-Kuzbari (1914–1998)	12 December 1961	12 September 1962	Independent	1 (1961)	9th convocation (1961–1963)
9		Said al-Ghazzi (1893–1967)	17 September 1962	7 March 1963	Independent	1 (1961)	9th convocation (1961–1963)
==== Chairman of the National Revolutionary Council (1965–1966) ====
No.	Portrait	Name (Birth–Death)	Term of office		Political party	Term	Convocation
1		Mansur al-Atrash (1926–2006)	1 September 1965	24 February 1966	Ba'ath Party (Syria Region)	1 (None)	1st convocation (1965–1966)
==== Speaker of the People's Assembly (1971–2024) ====
No.	Portrait	Name (Birth–Death)	Term of office		Political party	Term	Convocation
1		Ahmad al-Khatib (1933–1982)	22 February 1971	26 December 1971	Syrian Ba'ath Party (Syria Region)	1 (None)	1st convocation (1971–1973)
2		Fahmi al-Yusufi (?–2006)	27 December 1971	21 February 1973	Syrian Ba'ath Party (Syria Region)	1 (None)	1st convocation (1971–1973)
3		Muhammad Ali al-Halabi (1937–2016)	9 June 1973	8 June 1977	Syrian Ba'ath Party (Syria Region)	1 (1973)	2nd convocation (1973–1977)
3		Muhammad Ali al-Halabi (1937–2016)	18 August 1977	27 March 1978	Syrian Ba'ath Party (Syria Region)	2 (1977)	3rd convocation (1977–1981)
4		Mahmoud Hadid	30 March 1978	17 August 1981	Syrian Ba'ath Party (Syria Region)	1 (1977)	3rd convocation (1977–1981)
5		Mahmoud Al-Zoubi (1935–2000)	16 November 1981	15 November 1985	Syrian Ba'ath Party (Syria Region)	1 (1981)	4th convocation (1981–1985)
5		Mahmoud Al-Zoubi (1935–2000)	27 February 1986	18 February 1988	Syrian Ba'ath Party (Syria Region)	2 (1986)	5th convocation (1986–1990)
6		Abdul Qadir Qaddura (1935–2013)	19 February 1988	16 February 1990	Syrian Ba'ath Party (Syria Region)	1 (1986)	5th convocation (1986–1990)
6		Abdul Qadir Qaddura (1935–2013)	11 June 1990	10 June 1994	Syrian Ba'ath Party (Syria Region)	2 (1990)	6th convocation (1990–1994)
6		Abdul Qadir Qaddura (1935–2013)	10 September 1994	9 September 1998	Syrian Ba'ath Party (Syria Region)	3 (1994)	7th convocation (1994–1998)
6		Abdul Qadir Qaddura (1935–2013)	1999	2002	Syrian Ba'ath Party (Syria Region)	4 (1998)	8th convocation (1998–2003)
7		Muhammad Naji al-Otari (born 1944)	9 March 2003	18 September 2003	Syrian Ba'ath Party (Syria Region)	1 (2003)	9th convocation (2003–2007)
8		Mahmoud al-Abrash (born 1944)	7 October 2003	8 March 2007	Syrian Ba'ath Party (Syria Region)	1 (2003)	9th convocation (2003–2007)
8		Mahmoud al-Abrash (born 1944)	7 May 2007	7 May 2012	Syrian Ba'ath Party (Syria Region)	2 (2007)	10th convocation (2007–2012)
9		Mohammad Jihad al-Laham (born 1954)	24 May 2012	6 June 2016	Syrian Ba'ath Party (Syria Region)	1 (2012)	11th convocation (2012–2016)
10		Hadiya Khalaf Abbas (1958–2021)	6 June 2016	20 July 2017	Syrian Ba'ath Party (Syria Region)	1 (2016)	12th convocation (2016–2020)
11		Hammouda Sabbagh (born 1959)	28 September 2017	2020	Syrian Ba'ath Party (Syria Region)	1 (2016)	12th convocation (2016–2020)
11		Hammouda Sabbagh (born 1959)	2020	2024	Syrian Ba'ath Party (Syria Region)	2 (2020)	13th convocation (2020–2024)
11		Hammouda Sabbagh (born 1959)	2024	8 December 2024	Syrian Ba'ath Party (Syria Region)	3 (2024)	14th convocation (2024)
=== Syrian Arab Republic (2024) === ==== Speaker of the People's Assembly (2026–present) ====
No.	Portrait	Name (Birth–Death)	Term of office		Political party	Term	Convocation
1		Abdul Hamid al-Awak (born 1966)	12 July 2026	Incumbent	Independent	1 (2025)	1st convocation (2026–present)

== See also ==
- President of Syria
  - List of presidents of Syria
- List of heads of state of Syria
- Vice President of Syria
- Prime Minister of Syria
  - List of prime ministers of Syria
- Minister of Foreign Affairs and Expatriates (Syria)
