= Arab Democratic Union Party =

Arab Democratic Union Party حزب الاتحاد العربي الديمقراطي
- Secretary of the Central Committee: Iyad Ghassan Osman
- Founder: Muhammad al-Sufi
- Banned: 29 January 2025; 2 months ago
- Headquarters: Damascus
- Ideology: Arab nationalism Arab socialism Nasserism
- Political position: Left-wing
- National affiliation: National Progressive Front (until 2025)
- Colours: Green, Red, Black

The Arab Democratic Union Party (Arabic: حزب الاتحاد العربي الديمقراطي, Hizb Al-Ittihad Al-'Arabi Al-Dimuqrati) was a nationalist political party in Syria. During the Ba'athist era, it was part of the National Progressive Front (NPF) of parties that supported the Ba'ath Party. In the 22 April 2007 People's Council of Syria election the party was awarded 1 out of 250 seats in the parliament.

Following the fall of the Assad regime, the party along with the NPF was dissolved by the Syrian transitional government on 29 January 2025.

== Ideology ==
The party was committed to the ideals of Nasserism, the party states its intent as, "Building a society that is governed by social justice and in its ideological approach and its struggle is guided by Nasserism, thought and practice". The party was both Arab nationalist and Arab socialist.
