= National Covenant Party =

National Covenant Party Haraka al-'ahd al-waTani حركة العهد الوطني
- Secretary General: Ghassan Othman
- Founded: 1951
- Banned: 29 January 2025; 3 months ago
- Split from: Arab Socialist Movement
- Ideology: Arab nationalism Arab socialism Pan-Arabism
- National affiliation: National Progressive Front (until 2024)

Website
- Facebook page

The National Covenant Party (Arabic: حركة العهد الوطني, Haraka al-'ahd al-waTani) was a political party in Syria. During the Ba'athist era, it was part of the National Progressive Front (NPF) of parties that supported the ruling Ba'ath Party.

== History ==
The party was originally licensed as the Arab Socialist Party in 1951. Syrian political activist, Akram Hourani, was the party's secretary general. The party was a founding member of the NPF in 1972. In 2004 the party changed its name to the National Covenant Party.

Following the fall of the Assad regime, the party published a statement on Facebook endorsing the Syrian transitional government and celebrating "Syria's freedom from tyranny". An additional post adopted the Syrian opposition flag. Despite this, the party along with the NPF was dissolved by the Syrian caretaker government on 29 January 2025.

== Ideology ==
The party believed in Arab nationalism, the objective of the party is to promote Syrian national unity and social peace on democratic foundations based on political, economic and social pluralism and participation of all in decision-making.

== Election results ==
=== Syrian People's Assembly elections ===
Election	Seats	+/–
2007	3 / 250	New
2012	3 / 250	0
2016	1 / 250	▼2
2020	2 / 250	▲1
2024	2 / 250	0
