= National Progressive Front (Syria) =

Ba'athist-controlled political front in Syria

National Progressive Front الجبهة الوطنية التقدمية
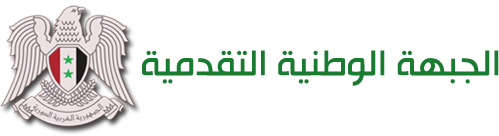
- President: Bashar al-Assad
- Vice-President: Mohammad al-Shaar
- Founder: Hafez al-Assad
- Founded: 1972; 54 years ago
- Dissolved: 29 January 2025; 21 months ago
- Headquarters: Damascus
- Political position: Left-wing; Factions: Centre-left to far-left

Website
- pnf.org.sy

The National Progressive Front (Arabic: الجبهة الوطنية التقدمية, romanized: al-Jabha al-Waṭaniyyah al-Taqaddumiyyah, NPF) was a Ba'athist Syrian state controlled coalition of left-wing parties that supported the Arab nationalist and Arab socialist orientation of the now defunct Assad family regime and accepted the "leading role" of the ruling Syrian Ba'ath party. The coalition was modelled after the popular front system used in the Communist Bloc, through which the Syrian Ba'ath party governed the country while permitting nominal participation of smaller, satellite parties. The NPF was part of the Ba'ath party's efforts to expand its support base and neutralize prospects for any sustainable liberal or left-wing opposition, by instigating splits within independent leftist parties or repressing them. The coalition was officially outlawed on 29 January 2025 at the Syrian Revolution Victory Conference, where Military Operations Command spokesman Hassan Abdul Ghani announced its dissolution.

The NPF model was created by the Ba'athist system to enforce a highly centralized presidential system. The satellite parties within the NPF had smaller political power and largely functioned as networks for mobilizing loyalty to the government. Student activism and political activities in armed forces were strictly prohibited for non-Ba'athist parties in the NPF, amongst other restrictions.

== History ==
The NPF was established in 1972 by Syrian president Hafez al-Assad to provide for a limited degree of participation in government by political parties other than the ruling Ba'ath Party. While the NPF had little influence in central bodies such as the People's Assembly, it was given more say at the local level, where non-Ba'athists and independent candidates were fielded. While the Ba'ath Party controlled the vast majority of votes in the central committees, several seats in the local were allotted for members of other NPF parties and independents. These minor parties were legally required to accept the leadership of the Ba'ath Party. The non-Ba'athist parties in the Progressive Front, for example, were not allowed to canvass for supporters in the army or the student body which were "reserved exclusively for the Ba'ath."

From 1972 to 2011, only parties participating in the NPF were legally permitted to operate in Syria. The Legislative Decree on Parties law of 2011, Legislative Decree on General Elections Law of 2011 and the new Syrian constitution of 2012 introduced multi-party system in Syria.

After previously being a part of NPF, the Syrian Social Nationalist Party joined the opposition's Popular Front for Change and Liberation for the May 2012 parliamentary election. However, in the June 2014 presidential election, the SSNP supported the re-election of Bashar al-Assad and subsequently rejoined the front.

Following the fall of the Assad regime in December 2024, the Ba'ath Party indefinitely halted all activities, and the Syrian Communist Party (Unified), the National Covenant Party and the SSNP attempted to distance themselves from neo-Ba'athist rule. On 29 January 2025, at the Syrian Revolution Victory Conference, Military Operations Command spokesman Hassan Abdul Ghani announced the dissolution of the NPF and its member parties.

However, despite the dissolution, the General Federation of Trade Unions and the General Union of Peasants still exist and cooperate with the transitional government.

== Constituent parties ==
The NPF was composed of the following political parties and associated organisations:

Party	Ideology
Arab Socialist Ba'ath Party	Neo-Ba'athism; Pan-Arabism
Syrian Social Nationalist Party	Syrian nationalism Secularism
Arab Socialist Union Party	Nasserism; Arab nationalism
Syrian Communist Party (Bakdash)	Communism; Marxism–Leninism
Socialist Unionist Party	Nasserism; Arab socialism
Syrian Communist Party (Unified)	Communism; Marxism–Leninism
National Covenant Party	Arab socialism Pan-Arabism
Arab Democratic Union Party	Nasserism; Arab nationalism
Democratic Socialist Unionist Party	Nasserism; Arab socialism Trade unionism
Arab Socialist Movement	Neo-Ba'athism; Arab socialism
Social Democratic Unionists	Social democracy Trade unionism
Associated organisations
General Federation of Trade Unions	Trade unionism Workers' rights
General Union of Peasants	Trade unionism Agrarianism
Revolutionary Youth Union	Neo-Ba'athism; Youth activism

== Electoral history ==
=== People's Assembly elections ===
Election	Seats	+/–	Position	Government
1973	186 / 186	New	1st	Sole legal coalition
1977	195 / 195	▲9	1st	Sole legal coalition
1981	195 / 195	Steady	1st	Sole legal coalition
1986	195 / 195	Steady	1st	Sole legal coalition
1990	250 / 250	▲55	1st	Sole legal coalition
1994	250 / 250	Steady	1st	Sole legal coalition
1998	250 / 250	Steady	1st	Sole legal coalition
2003	250 / 250	Steady	1st	Sole legal coalition
2007	250 / 250	Steady	1st	Sole legal coalition
2012	168 / 250	▼82	1st	Governing coalition
2016	200 / 250	▲32	1st	Governing coalition
2020	183 / 250	▼17	1st	Governing coalition
2024	185 / 250	▲2	1st	Governing coalition

== See also ==
- National Progressive Front (Iraq)
