= Democratic Socialist Unionist Party =

Democratic Socialist Unionist Party الحزب الوحدوي الاشتراكي الديمقراطي
- Secretary General: Fadlallah Nasreddin
- Founded: 10 October 1974
- Banned: 29 January 2025; 19 months ago
- Split from: Socialist Unionist Party
- Headquarters: Damascus, Syria
- Ideology: Nasserism; Arab socialism Trade unionism
- Political position: Left-wing
- National affiliation: National Progressive Front (1988–2024)

Website
- Facebook page

The Democratic Socialist Unionist Party (Arabic: الحزب الوحدوي الاشتراكي الديمقراطي, al-Hizb al-waHdawi al-ishtiraki ad-dimuqraTi) was a political party in Syria founded in 1974 as a breakaway faction of the Socialist Unionist Party.

Following the fall of the Assad regime, the party along with the National Progressive Front (NPF), of which it was a member since 1988, was dissolved by the Syrian transitional government on 29 January 2025.

== History ==
The Democratic Socialist Unionist Party was led by Secretary General Ahmad al-Asa'ad from its founding until al-Asa'ad's death on March 9, 2001. Al-Asa'ad was a member of the Political Bureau of the Socialist Unionist Party (SUP) until 1974, when he was pushed out by the SUP's secretary-general.

After al-Asa'ad's death in 2001, the party's Political Bureau invited the Central Committee to elect a secretary general. The victory went to Ahmad al-Asa'ad's son, Firas al-Asa'ad, the secretary of the Political Bureau, who received nearly half of the votes cast. Firas al-Asa'ad remained the secretary general for more than a year without the formal decision of the party leadership giving him the position. During that period, Fadlallah Nasreddin moved to circumvent al-Asa'ad, who succumbed to pressure from inside or outside of the party. The Central Committee protested and decided to elect an interim secretary general for a period of three months. Fadlallah Nasreddin was elected with the support of Firas al-Asa'ad, provided that the new secretary general and the Political Bureau would hold a general conference of the Party. The conference did not happen, and Fadlallah continued as secretary general by acclimation. He was a member of the Ba'athist era People's Council of Syria.

In the 2007 Syrian parliamentary election, the party was awarded 4 out of 250 seats in the parliament.

Following the fall of the Assad regime, the party along with the National Progressive Front (NPF) was dissolved by the Syrian transitional government on 29 January 2025.
