= Socialist Unionist Party (Syria) =

Socialist Unionist Party حزب الوحدويين الاشتراكيين
- Leader: Fayiz Ismail
- Founded: 1962
- Banned: 29 January 2025; 8 months ago
- Split from: Ba'ath Party
- Headquarters: Damascus, Syria
- Newspaper: Al-Wahdawi
- Ideology: Nasserism; Arab nationalism Arab socialism
- Political position: Left-wing
- National affiliation: National Progressive Front (until 2024)

Website
- alwahdawi.org

The Socialist Unionist Party (Arabic: حزب الوحدويين الاشتراكيين Al-Wahdawiyyun Al-Ishtirakiyyun) was a Nasserist political party in Syria. The party was founded in 1962 through a split in the Ba'ath Party. During the Ba'athist era, it was part of the National Progressive Front of legally permitted parties that supported socialism and Arab nationalism. The party leader is Fayiz Ismail. Abdullah Sallum Abdullah, a member of this party, ran for president in the 2021 election.

Following the fall of the Assad regime, the party was banned by the Syrian transitional government due to its support for the dictatorship.

== Election results ==
=== Presidential elections ===
Election	Party candidate	Votes	%	Result
2021	Abdullah Sallum Abdullah	213,968	1.50%	Not elected ✗

=== Syrian People's Assembly elections ===
Election	Seats	+/–
1973	1 / 250	▼3
1977	3 / 250	▲2
1981	8 / 250	▲5
1986	8 / 250	Steady
1990	7 / 250	▼1
1994	7 / 250	Steady
1998	7 / 250	Steady
2003	0 / 250	▼7
2007	6 / 250	▲6
2012	18 / 250	▲12
2016	2 / 250	▼16
2020	2 / 250	Steady
2024	2 / 250	Steady
