= Arab Socialist Movement =

Arab Socialist Movement حركة الاشتراكيين العرب
- Leader: Omar Adnan al-Alawi (Damascus branch)
- Founder: Akram al-Hawrani
- Founded: 5 January 1950; 75 years ago
- Headquarters: Damascus, Syria
- Ideology: Arab socialism Arab nationalism Pan-Arabism; Neo-Ba'athism (Damascus branch); Anti-Islamism (Damascus branch)
- Political position: Left-wing
- National affiliation: National Progressive Front (Damascus branch); National Democratic Rally (Ayyash faction); National Coordination Committee for Democratic Change

The Arab Socialist Movement (Arabic: حركة الاشتراكيين العرب- Harakat al-Ishtirakiyīn al-'Arab) also known as Arab Socialist Party, was a political party in Syria that has split into several factions since the 1960s which continue to use the same name.

== History ==
The Arab Socialist Movement traced its roots back to the "Youth Party", a 1930s radical anti-capitalist, pan-Arab group led by Othman al-Hawrani. In its later form, it was formally established as "Arab Socialist Party" in the 1950s, and was led by Akram al-Hawrani from then on. The party merged with the Ba'ath Party in 1953, only to withdraw again in 1963. It then split into several factions:

- One faction, known as Damascus branch and headed by Abdul-Ghani Qannout, joined the Ba'ath Party-led National Progressive Front government in 1972 and has continued to support the al-Assad family's rule in Syria ever since. It is active in Syria and Lebanon. After Abdul-Ghani Qannout died in 2001, Ahmad al-Ahmad became the new secretary general; under him, the party continued its pro-government course, even during the Syrian Civil War. Amid the conflict's civil uprising phase, the Arab Socialist Movement's Damascus branch organised pro-government rallies. When the uprising escalated into a full insurgency, members of the party organised pro-government militias. Assistant secretary general Omar Adnan al-Alawi headed the National Defence Forces' Deir ez-Zor branch during part of the Siege of Deir ez-Zor (2014–17), and was wounded in combat. Al-Alawi later aided a member of the party's political office, Turki Albu Hamad, in founding the "Forces of the Fighters of the Tribes" militia. Ahmad al-Ahmad died on 25 August 2016, leaving the office of secretary general vacant until the election of Omar al-Alawi as official party head on 24 May 2017.
- Another splinter group was led by the former officer Abdul-Ghani Ayyash (died 2010), and joined the opposition in form of the National Democratic Rally.
- One faction of Marxists, led by Akram al-Bunni, split off and formed the "National Council of Damascus Declaration for National Democratic Change", which was suppressed by the Assad government.
- Another branch has also gained legal recognition and parliamentary representation in Syria, but under the name "National Covenant Party".

== Bibliography ==
- Akram al-Bunni (2013). An Analysis of the Syrian Left Realities (PDF). Rosa Luxemburg Foundation.
- Seale, Patrick (1990). Asad of Syria: The Struggle for the Middle East. University of California Press. ISBN 0-520-06976-5.
