= Arab Socialist Union Party (Syria) =

Arab Socialist Union Party of Syria حزب الاتحاد الاشتراكي العربي في سورية
- Leader: Baria al-Qudsi
- Founded: 1973
- Dissolved: 29 January 2025; 19 months ago
- Split from: Arab Socialist Movement
- Headquarters: Damascus, Syria
- Ideology: Arab nationalism Arab socialism Nasserism; Pan-Arabism; Left-wing nationalism
- Political position: Left-wing
- National affiliation: National Progressive Front (until 2024)

Website
- Arab Socialist Union Party on Facebook

Former logo of the party

The Arab Socialist Union Party of Syria (ASU; Arabic: حزب الاتحاد الاشتراكي العربي في سورية, romanized: Hizb Al-Ittihad Al-Ishtiraki Al-'Arabi fi Suriyah) is a banned Nasserist political party in Syria. The party was formed in 1973, following a split from the original ASU. The party was most recently led by Baria al-Qudsi.

Following the fall of the Assad regime, the party along with the National Progressive Front (NPF), of which it was a member, was dissolved by the Syrian transitional government on 29 January 2025.

== History ==
=== Background: Arab Socialism in Syria ===
Non-Nasserite Arab socialism in Syria has its origins in the Arab Socialist Party (ASP; also ASM, for Arab Socialist Movement). This party grew out of Syria's Hizb al-Shabab (Youth Party). In 1950, Akram al-Hawrani took over leadership of the party and changed its name to the Arab Socialist Party. After initial successes, the ASP was banned by Syria's de facto leader, Adib ash-Shishakli, in 1952, as he considered it to be too powerful a political rival. Akram al-Hawrani went into exile in Lebanon, and there agreed on a merger with a nationalist and pan-Arabist opposition party, the Arab Ba'ath Party. The new party was called the Arab Socialist Ba'ath Party.

In 1959, the Syrian section of the Ba'ath Party dissolved to leave room for the National Union, which was the only legal party within the United Arab Republic (a Syria-Egypt merger under Gamal Abdel Nasser's leadership). However, dissent over the union grew, and another conference, a year later, reversed the party's decision. When the UAR dissolved in 1961, the Ba'ath Party struggled to reform its Syrian branch and several groups broke away, including a Nasserist and pro-unionist tendency (which formed the Socialist Unionist Party, SUP) and a strongly anti-Nasserist current under Akram al-Hawrani, who recreated his former ASP. Meanwhile, several other Nasserite and pro-Egyptian factions worked in opposition to the "separatist" government and demanded renewed union with Egypt.

=== Formation as opposition ===
In 1964, these Syrian Nasserist parties and organizations (including the SUP, the Movement of Arab Nationalists, the United Arab Front and the Socialist Union) created a Syrian branch of the Egyptian-led Arab Socialist Union, which—after a Nasserite coup attempt in the Spring of 1963—was in militant opposition to Syria's Baath-led government. The organization was led by exiles in Cairo, and remained weakly organized in Syria despite considerable popular support, due to restrictions imposed by the Baathists. It quickly fragmented, with a faction of the former SU under Faiz Ismail removing itself from the ASU. The Arab Nationalist Movement also continued to work in their separate organizational structures in Syria, despite being formally committed to Nasser's order to unite in the ASU; much of this organization later dissolved into different political groups, including the ASU and the Palestinian PFLP and DFLP.

=== Legalization and split ===
After Hafez al-Assad took power in 1970, the ASU entered into negotiations about a coalition government, and agreed to join the National Progressive Front (NPF) in 1972. The year after, however, the party split over the adoption of a Syrian constitution in which the Ba'ath was proclaimed the "leading party" of the country. One minor faction under Fawzi Kiyali accepted the constitution, and retained both the ASU name and the NPF membership, while most members followed party leader Jamal al-Atassi into opposition, by renaming themselves the Democratic Arab Socialist Union (DASU). Both the ASU and DASU distanced themselves from Anwar Sadat's government, particularly after his policies towards Israel became more conciliatory, and their close relations with Cairo were lost before the Egyptian mother party itself dissolved in the mid-1970s.

=== ASU and DASU today ===
The Arab Socialist Union Party of Syria (i.e., the ex-Kiyali faction), which glorifies the Baath presidency and shows virtually no independence from the government, has long been led by Safwan al-Qudsi. In the 2003 legislative elections, the NPF bloc was awarded 167 out of 250 seats in the Syrian parliament, and of these seven belonged to the ASU. In the 2007 elections, the party was awarded 8 out of 250 seats in the parliament, making it formally the second-largest party after the Baath itself. This does not reflect popular support for the party, however, since the NPF runs on uncontested lists; on these, the Ba'ath always holds a majority both inside the NPF and inside the parliament, while other member parties negotiate with the government for their share of candidates.

Since the death of al-Atassi, the DASU has been led by Hassan Abdelazim. It remains an illegal party and has been subject to sporadic repression; although it became semi-openly active after the accession of Bashar al-Assad to power in 2000, and under the limited liberalization that followed. The DASU is the leading member of the National Democratic Gathering, a nationalist-leftist opposition alliance founded in 1979.

Following the death of Safwan al-Qudsi, he was succeeded by Baria al-Qudsi in February 2023.

=== Ban ===
Following the fall of the Assad regime, the party was banned by the Syrian transitional government due to its support for the dictatorship.

== Election results ==
=== Syrian People's Assembly elections ===
Election	Seats	+/–
2007	8 / 250	New
2012	2 / 250	▼6
2016	2 / 250	Steady
2020	3 / 250	▲1
2024	2 / 250	▼1

== See also ==
- Category:Arab Socialist Union Party (Syria) politicians
- Arab Socialist Union (Egypt)
- Arab Socialist Union (Iraq)
- Arab Socialist Union (Libya)
