= Nureddin al-Atassi government =

1968–1970 Syrian government

- 75th government of the Syrian Arab Republic

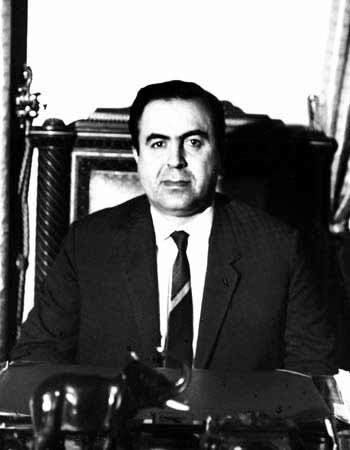
- Date formed: 29 October 1968
- Date dissolved: 15 November 1970

People and organisations
- President: Nureddin al-Atassi
- Prime Minister: Nureddin al-Atassi
- No. of ministers: 23 (until 1969); 24 (from 1969)
- Member party: ▌Ba'ath Party

History
- Outgoing formation: 1970 coup d'état
- Legislature term: –
- Predecessor: Zuayyin II
- Successor: al-Assad

The Nureddin al-Atassi was the seventy-fifth government since the establishment of the modern Syrian state in 1918 and the tenth government formed following the Ba'athist coup in March 1963 in 1961. Established on 29 October 1968 by Decree No. 2434, issued on 28 October 1968, the government was headed by Nureddin al-Atassi, who also served as President of Syria. It remained in office until the 1970 Syrian coup d'etat of November 1970, led by Hafez al-Assad.

The government was formed in the aftermath of the Fourth Regional Congress of the Arab Socialist Ba'ath Party in September 1968, during a period of increasing tension between the party's civilian leadership and the military establishment. The congress, followed by the Tenth National Congress of the Ba'ath Party, adopted resolutions aimed at reshaping the balance of power within the ruling elite. While Prime Minister Yusuf Zuayyin accepted the decisions and resigned, Minister of Defence Hafez al-Assad refused to implement measures that would have diminished the influence of the armed forces, marking the first major confrontation between the military leadership and the party's political leadership.

To contain the dispute, members of the Ba'ath Party's National Command intervened to postpone implementation of the congress's decisions. Nevertheless, Zuayyin insisted on resigning, prompting President Nur al-Din al-Atassi to assume the premiership and form a new government. In an effort to preserve unity within the regime, Hafez al-Assad remained Minister of Defence, ensuring the continued influence of the military in government. The tensions that emerged during the formation of the cabinet ultimately culminated in the 1970 coup d'etat of November 1970, which brought al-Assad to power and ended al-Atassi's government.

== Composition ==
Portfolio	Minister	Took office	Left office
Prime Minister	Nureddin al-Atassi	29 October 1968	15 November 1970
Minister of Defense	Hafez al-Assad	1 March 1966	15 November 1970
Minister of Interior	Muhammad Rabah al-Tawil	29 October 1968	15 November 1970
Minister of Foreign Affairs	Muhammad Eid Aishawi	29 October 1968	29 May 1969
Minister of Foreign Affairs	Mustafa al-Sayed	29 May 1969	15 November 1970
Minister of Frontline Villages Affairs	Hadithi Murad	29 October 1968	29 May 1969
Minister of Frontline Villages Affairs	Mamdouh Jaber	29 May 1969	15 November 1970
Minister of Agriculture and Agrarian Reform	Fayez al-Jasim	16 October 1966	29 May 1969
Minister of Agriculture and Agrarian Reform	Muhammad Said Talib	29 May 1969	15 November 1970
Minister of Public Works and Water Resources	Mamdouh Jaber	1 March 1966	29 May 1969
Minister of Public Works and Water Resources	Sami Soufan	29 May 1969	15 November 1970
Minister of Education	Suleiman al-Khash	16 October 1966	29 May 1969
Minister of Education	Mahmoud al-Ayyubi	29 May 1969	15 November 1970
Minister of Finance	Muwaffaq al-Sharbaji	1 March 1966	29 May 1969
Minister of Finance	Nourallah Nourallah	29 May 1969	15 November 1970
Minister of Endowments	Ghalib Abdoun	1 March 1966	15 November 1970
Minister of Economy and Foreign Trade	Zuhair al-Khani	28 September 1967	29 May 1969
Minister of Economy and Foreign Trade	Abdul Halim Khaddam	29 May 1969	15 November 1970
Minister of Industry	Adnan Azzouz	16 October 1966	29 May 1969
Minister of Industry	Marwan Habash	29 May 1969	15 November 1970
Minister of Municipal and Rural Affairs	Fayez Ismail	28 September 1967	15 November 1970
Minister of Oil, Electricity and Industrial Projects Implementation	Ahmad al-Hassan	28 September 1967	15 November 1970
Minister of Health	Zakariya Khayyata	29 October 1968	29 May 1969
Minister of Health	Daoud al-Radawi	29 May 1969	15 November 1970
Minister of Higher Education	Mustafa al-Sayed	28 September 1967	29 May 1969
Minister of Higher Education	Mustafa Haddad	29 May 1969	15 November 1970
Minister of Culture, National Guidance and Tourism	Suhail al-Ghazzi	28 September 1967	15 November 1970
Minister of Supply	Muhammad Talab Hilal	29 October 1968	15 November 1970
Minister of Social Affairs and Labor	Abdallah al-Faleh	29 October 1968	15 November 1970
Minister of State for Planning Affairs	Naji al-Darawsha	29 October 1968	15 November 1970
Minister of Information	Asaad Saqr	29 October 1968	29 May 1969
Minister of Information	Hammoud al-Qabbani	29 May 1969	15 November 1970
Minister of Justice	Ibrahim Hamzawi	29 October 1968	15 November 1970
Minister of Transportation	Wasil Faisal	29 October 1968	15 November 1970
Minister of State	Hisham Hallaj	29 May 1969	15 November 1970

== See also ==
- Council of Ministers (Syria)
- List of Syrian governments
- Government ministries of Syria
- List of prime ministers of Syria
