= Presidency of Hafez al-Assad =

Syrian presidential administration from 1971 to 2000

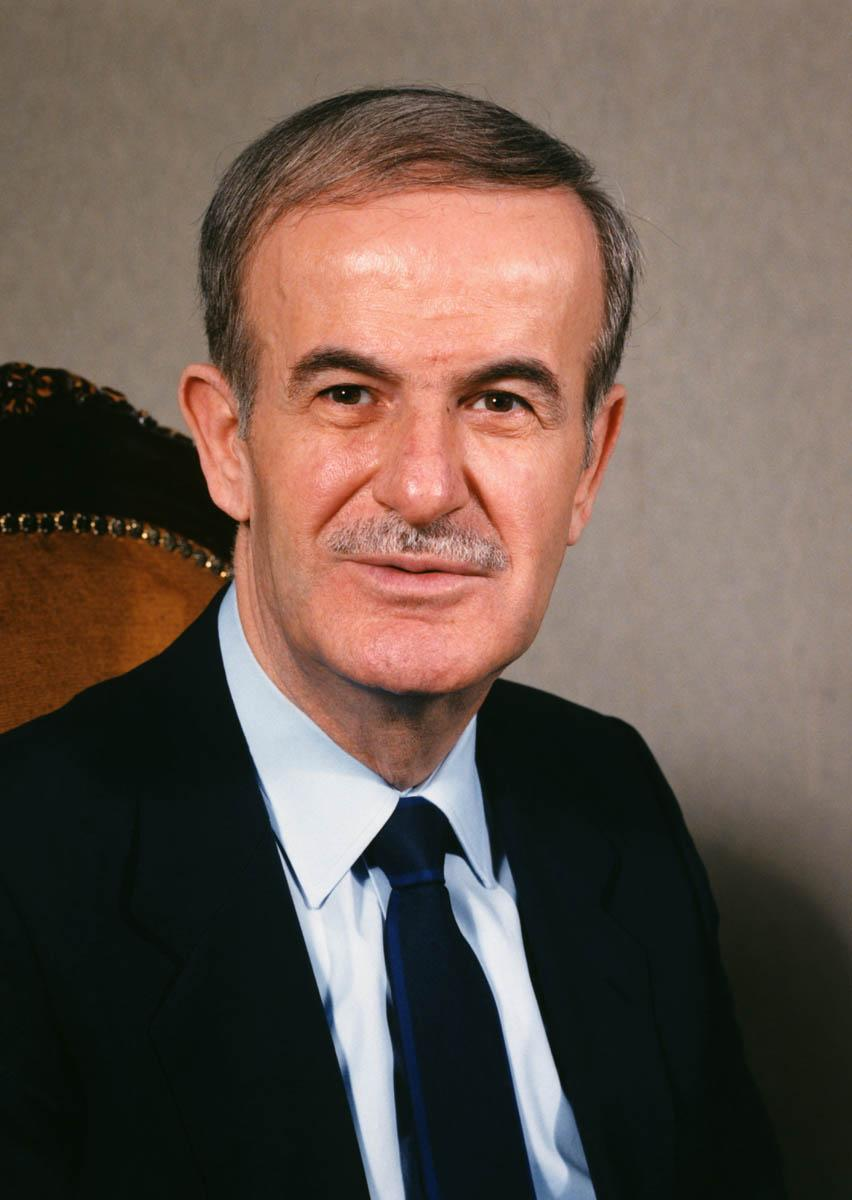
- Presidency of Hafez al-Assad; 12 March 1971 – 10 June 2000
- Party: Ba'ath Party
- Seat: Presidential Palace, Damascus (from 1985)
- Seal of the President

Hafez al-Assad served as the President of Syria from 12 March 1971 until his death on 10 June 2000. He had been Prime Minister of Syria, leading a government for two years. He was succeeded by his son, Bashar al-Assad.

Assad consolidated his power by imposition of mass surveillance on the society and ran a military dictatorship characterised by human rights violations, arbitrary detentions, extrajudicial killings and elimination of leftist and conservative opposition. Various journalists and political scientists have described his regime as totalitarian. Major events during his tenure include the 1976 Syrian intervention in the Lebanese Civil War launched against the Palestinian and leftist militias, resulting in the Syrian occupation of Lebanon until 2005. Domestically, his early years in power witnessed Sunni uprisings against his rule, which were violently put down during the 1982 Hama massacre, an incident estimated to have killed between 20,000-40,000 civilians.

== Domestic policies ==
=== Corrective Revolution ===
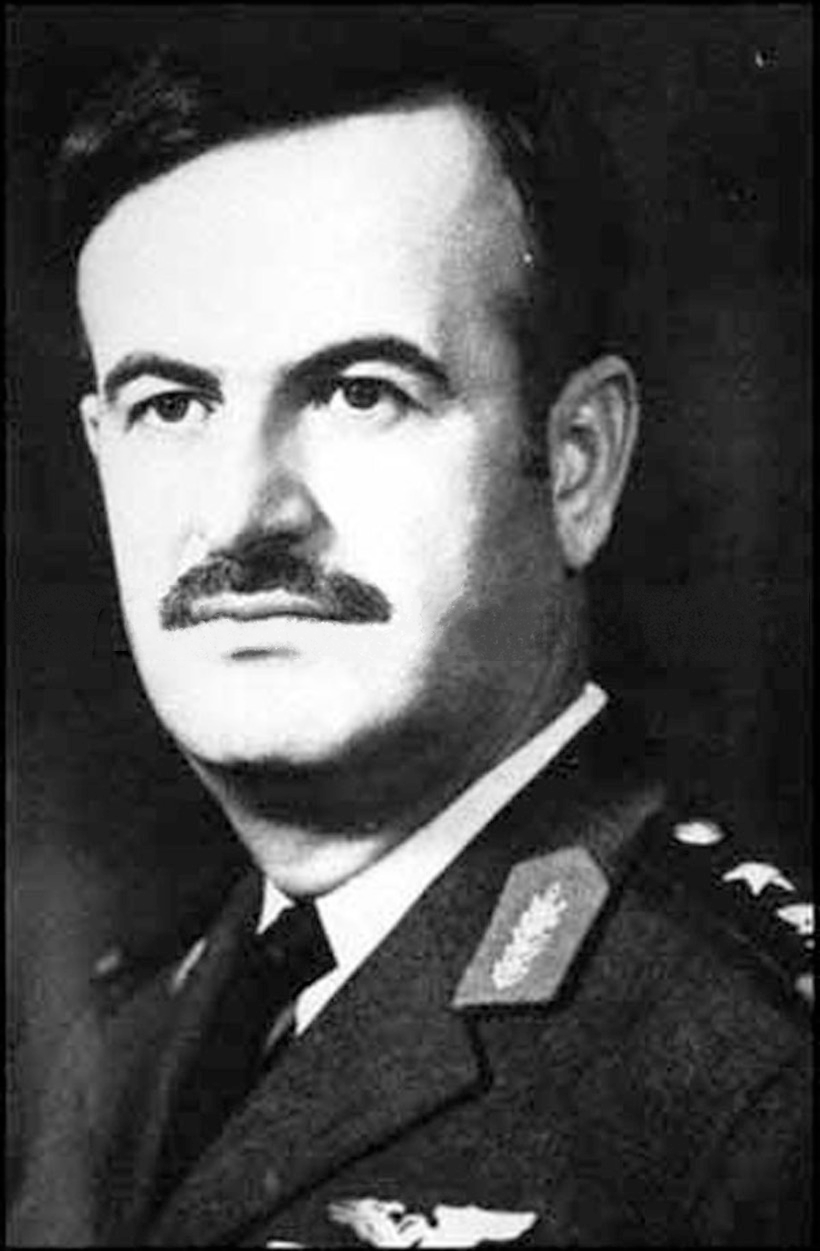
Hafez Assad after the coup.

In 1971, while prime minister, Assad embarked upon a "corrective revolution" at the Eleventh National Congress of the Ba'ath Party. There was to be a general revision of national policy, which also included the introduction of measures to consolidate his rule: so he launched huge reformist comprehensive campaign (what became known as Corrective Movement program) and started consolidating his power (what became known as the Assadization). His Ba'athist predecessors had restricted control of Islam in public life and government. Because the Constitution only allowed Muslims to become president, Assad, unlike his predecessor Salah Jadid, presented himself as a pious Muslim. In order to gain support from the ulama—the educated Muslim class— he prayed in Sunni mosques, even though he was an Alawite. Among the measures he introduced were the raising in the rank of some 2,000 religious functionaries and the appointment of an alim as minister of religious functionaries and construction of mosques. He appointed a little-known Sunni teacher, Ahmad al-Khatib, as Head of State in order to satisfy the Sunni majority. Assad also appointed Sunnis to senior positions in the government, the military and the party. All of Assad's prime ministers, defense ministers and foreign ministers and a majority of his cabinet were Sunnis. In the early 1970s, he was verified as an authentic Muslim by the Sunni Mufti of Damascus and made the Hajj—the pilgrimage to Mecca. In his speeches, he often used terms such as jihad (struggle) and shahada (martyrdom) when referring to fighting Israel.

After gaining enough power, Assad needed to become leader of the Ba'ath Party, so he ordered the arrests and discharge of the incumbent party leaders, replacing them by his own supporters in the Ba'ath Regional Command. They promptly elected him as secretary-general of the party's Syrian branch, confirming his status as the country's de facto leader. The Regional Command also appointed a new People's Assembly, which in 1971 nominated him for the presidency as the only candidate. On 22 February 1971, Assad resigned from the Syrian Air Force and was subsequently endorsed as president with 99.6% of the vote at the referendum held on 12 March 1971. He also returned the old Islamic Presidential Oath of Office. While continuing to use the Ba'ath Party, its ideology and its expanding apparatus as instruments of his rule and policies, Assad established a powerful, centralized presidential system with absolute authority for the first time in Syria's modern history.

Assad wanted his government to appear democratic. The People's Assembly and his cabinet consisted of several nationalist and socialist parties under the umbrella of the National Progressive Front, which was led by the Ba'ath Party. Half of his cabinet were representatives of peasants and workers, and a number of popular organizations of peasants, workers, women and students were established in order to participate in the decision-making process. As he gained support from the peasantry, workers, the youth, the military and the Alawite community, Assad wanted to destroy his remaining opposition. He tried to present himself as a leader-reformer, a state-builder and nation-builder by developing and modernizing the country's socio-economic infrastructure, achieving political stability, economic opportunities and ideological consensus. As he wanted to create ideological consensus and national unity, Assad advocated a dynamic regional policy while opposing Zionism and imperialism.

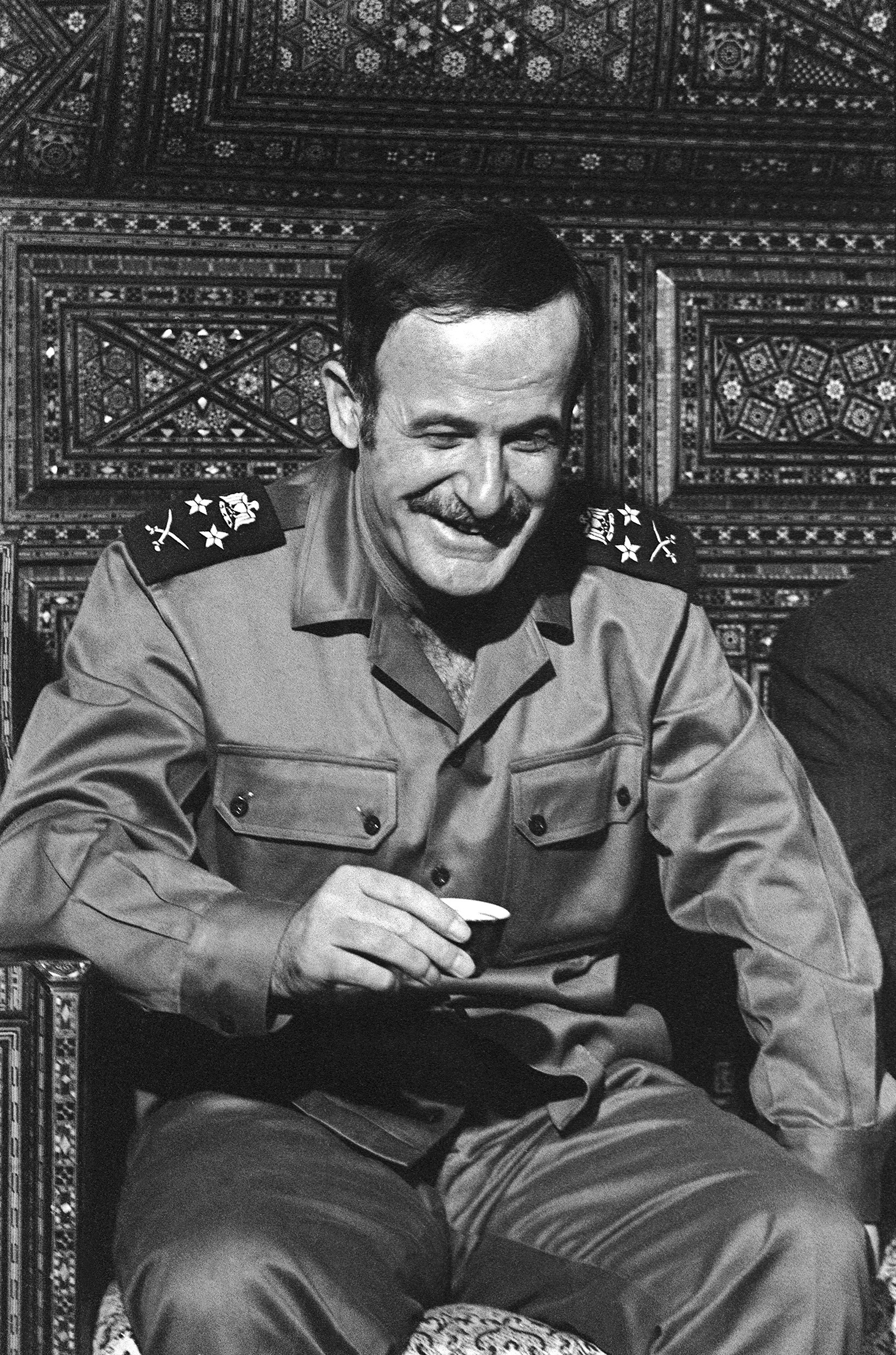
Hafez al-Assad drinking a cup of coffee (October 1973)

On 31 January 1973, Assad implemented the new Constitution which led to a national crisis. Unlike previous constitutions, this one did not require that the president of Syria must be a Muslim, leading to fierce demonstrations in Hama, Homs and Aleppo organized by the Muslim Brotherhood and the ulama. They labeled Assad as the "enemy of Allah" and called for a jihad against his rule. Robert D. Kaplan has compared Assad's coming to power to "an untouchable becoming maharajah in India or a Jew becoming tsar in Russia—an unprecedented development shocking to the Sunni majority population which had monopolized power for so many centuries." Assad responded by arresting about 40 Sunni officers who were accused of plotting. Nevertheless, Assad returned the requirement to the Constitution to please the Sunnis, but he stated that he "rejects every uncultured interpretation of Islam that lays bare an odious narrow-mindedness and loathsome bigotry". In 1974, to satisfy this constitutional requirement, Musa Sadr, a leader of the Twelvers of Lebanon and founder of the Amal Movement who had unsuccessfully tried to unite Lebanese Alawis and Shias under the Supreme Islamic Shiite Council, issued a fatwa stating that Alawis were a community of Twelver Shia Muslims.

For his entire tenure as Syria's president, Assad ruled under the terms of a state of emergency dating from 1963. Under the provisions of the emergency law, the press was limited to three Ba'ath-controlled newspapers and political dissidents were often tried in security courts that operated outside the regular judicial system. Human Rights Watch estimated that a minimum of 17,000 people disappeared without the formalities of a trial during Assad's rule. Every seven years, Assad was nominated as the sole candidate for president by the People's Council, and confirmed in office by a referendum. He was re-elected four times, each time gaining over 99 percent of the vote—including three times in which he received unanimous support, according to official figures. For all intents and purposes, he held complete political control over the country.

=== Islamist uprising ===
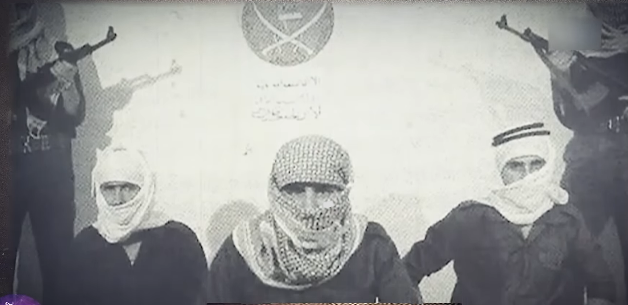
Muslim Brotherhood militants, 1979.

The government faced further threats from a resurgence of the Islamist opposition. Assad's earlier support of the Christian Maronites and his military actions against the Muslim radicals in Lebanon provoked a new and unprecedented phase of Muslim resistance in the form of well-organized and effective urban guerrilla warfare against the government, military, and Ba'athist officials and institutions. During the late 1970s and early 1980s, the Islamic jihad became almost an open rebellion as many Alawite soldiers, officers and senior officials were killed, and government and military centres were bombed by the Muslim mujahideen.

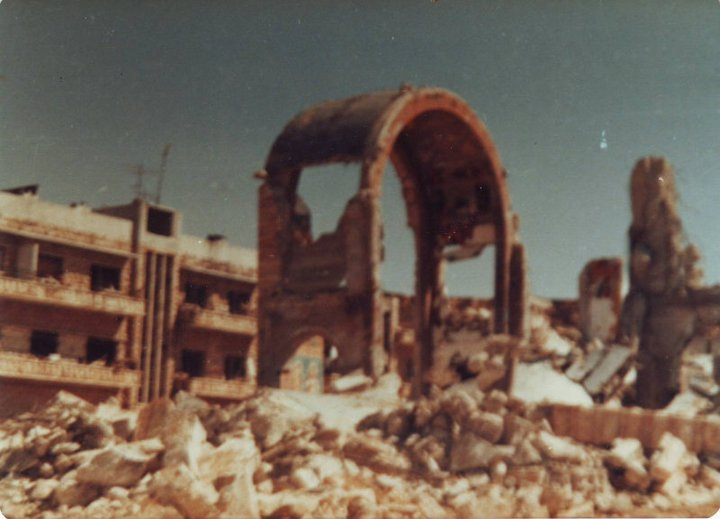
Hama devastation, 1982.

Facing a serious threat to his government and possibly to his life, Assad for the first time lost his self-confidence and reacted with fury and desperation. His health also started to deteriorate during this period. Under his personal orders a campaign of repression was launched against the Muslim Brotherhood. Assad escaped an attempted assassination in a grenade attack in 1980. In response, troops led by his brother Rifaat took revenge by killing 250 inmates at Tadmor Prison in Palmyra. In February 1982, the rebellious city of Hama was bombed by Assad's troops, killing between 10,000 and 40,000 people. It was later described as "the single deadliest act by any Arab government against people in the modern Middle East." Over the next few years, thousands of Muslim Brotherhood followers were arrested and tortured, and many of them were killed or disappeared. Assad realized that his previous efforts to bring about national unity in Syria and to gain legitimacy from the Sunni urban population had totally failed. He was confronted with resistance from the Muslim Brotherhood and thousands of their followers. Large sections of the urban intelligentsia, professionals, intellectuals and former Ba'ath Party members, also regarded his government as illegitimate. Later, Assad used the threat of the Muslim Brotherhood to justify his heavy-handed rule.

=== Society ===
Assad became increasingly reliant on the further cultivation of his close constituencies as a support base and a new political community consisting of large sections of peasants and workers, salaried middle-class and public employees—both Sunnis and non-Sunnis. These groups, mostly organized in the Ba'ath Party, mass syndicates, and trade unions, like most Alawites, and Christians, greatly benefited from Assad's policies, and either depended on him or were ideologically identified with his government. Many young Syrians also had a strong allegiance to Assad, since they had been educated or indoctrinated in the notions of the Ba'ath Party as formulated by Assad. These sections of the population rendered legitimacy to Assad's government and were periodically mobilised by Assad to actively support his policies and curb his domestic enemies. Assad's main support base remained the Alawite community, the combat units of the Syrian Armed Forces and the wide network of security and intelligence organizations. The Jews were also treated well by Assad.

Members of the Alawite community and non-Alawites loyal to Assad virtually controlled the security, intelligence and military apparatuses. They manned or commanded about a dozen security and intelligence networks and most armoured divisions, commandos and other combat units of the Syrian Armed Forces. Assad had turned some of his intelligence networks into apparatuses for terrorism against targets in the Middle East and in Europe.

=== Health problems ===
In November 1983, Assad—who was a diabetic—suffered a serious heart attack, which was complicated by phlebitis. He withdrew from public life and a battle for succession took place between Rifaat and the army generals. Assad's recovery and return brought an end to the discord and he took advantage of the situation to undermine his brother's position, eventually sending him into exile. Assad's return to supreme power was confirmed at the eighth party congress in January 1985.

=== Economy ===
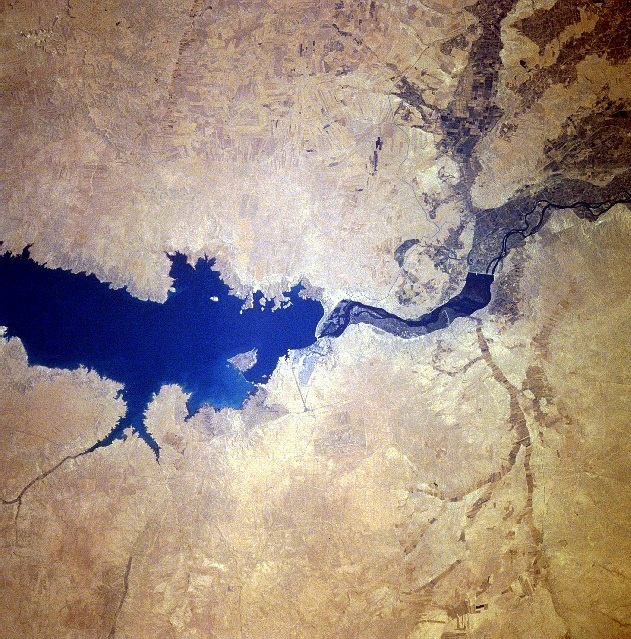
Tabqa Dam built in 1974 (center of image).

Assad called his domestic reforms as a corrective movement, and achieved some results. Assad tried to modernize Syria's agricultural and industrial sectors. One of Assad's main achievements was the completion of the Tabqa Dam on the Euphrates River in 1974. It is one of the biggest dams in the world, and its reservoir was called Lake Assad. The reservoir increased the irrigation of arable land, provided electricity, and encouraged industrial and technical development in Syria. Many peasants and workers received increased financial incomes, social security, and improved health and education services. The urban middle classes, who had been hurt by the Jadid government's policy, obtained new economic opportunities.

By 1977, it became apparent that despite some successes, Assad's political reforms had largely failed. This was partly due to Assad's miscalculations or mistakes, and partly to factors he could not control or change quickly. Chronic socio-economic difficulties remained and new ones appeared. Inefficiency, mismanagement, and corruption in the government, public, and private sectors, illiteracy, poor education, particularly in rural areas, the increasing emigration of professionals, inflation, a growing trade deficit, a high cost of living and shortages of consumer goods were among the problems Syria faced. The financial burden of Syria's involvement in Lebanon since 1976 contributed to worsening economic problems and encouraged corruption and the black market. The emerging class of entrepreneurs and brokers became involved with senior military officers— including Rifaat—in the smuggling of contraband goods from Lebanon, which affected government revenues and spread corruption among senior government officials.

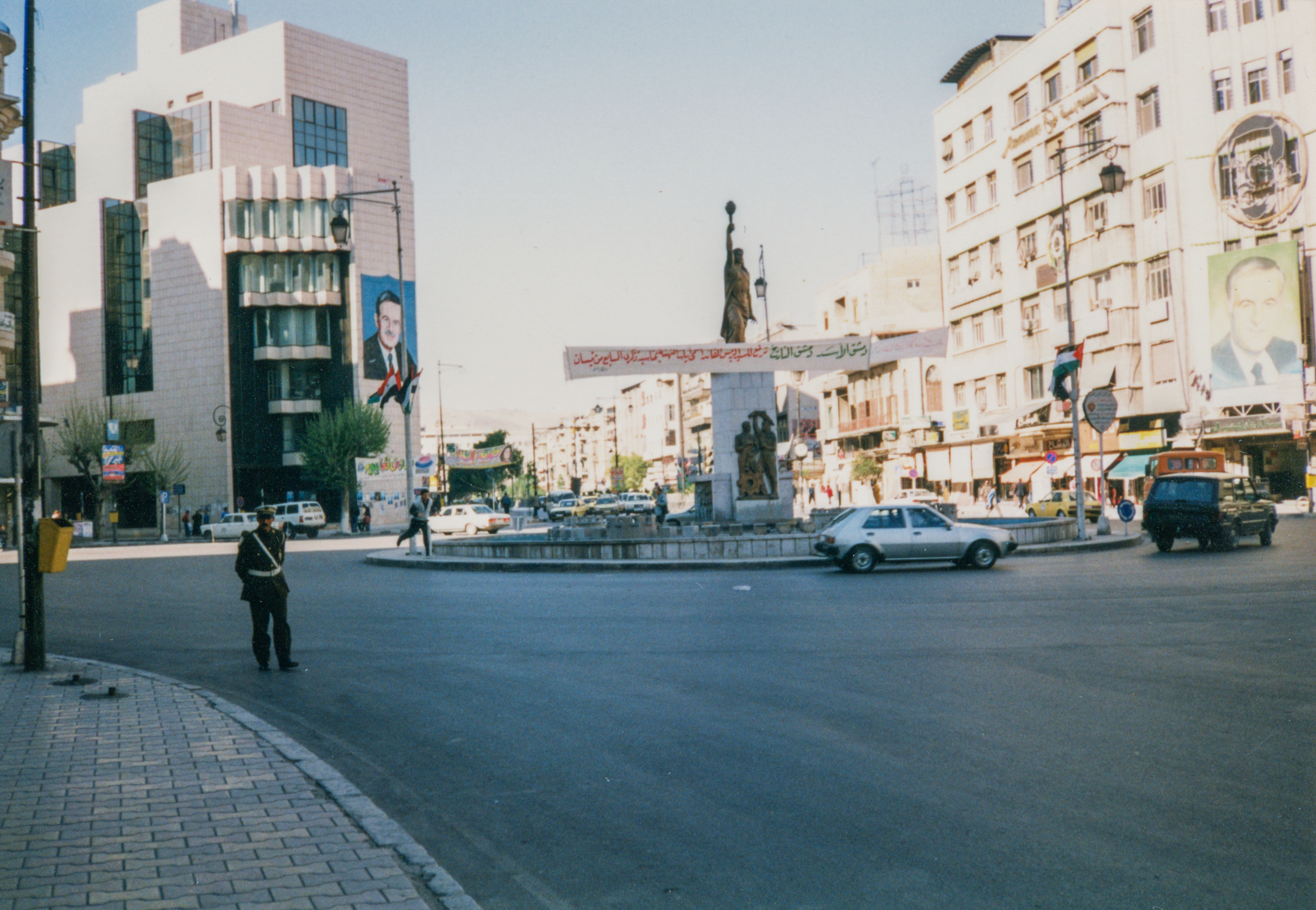
Yousef al-Azm Square, Damascus.

In the early 1980s, Syria's economy worsened and by mid-1984 the food crisis was so serious that the press was full of complaints. Assad's government sought a solution and argued that food shortages could be avoided with careful economic planning. In August the food crisis continued despite the government measures. Syria lacked sugar, bread, flour, wood, iron, and construction equipment, which resulted in soaring prices, long queues, and rampant black marketeering. Smuggling of goods from Lebanon was a common occurrence. Assad's government tried to combat the smuggling but encountered problems due to the involvement of Rif'at in the illegal business. In July 1984, the government formed an anti-smuggling squad to control the Lebanon-Syria borders, which proved effective. The Defense Detachment commanded by Rif'at played a leading role in the smuggling, and imported $US400,000 worth of goods a day. The anti-smuggling squads seized $US3.8 million worth of goods in its first week.

In the early 1990s, the Syrian economy grew between 5%–7%, exports increased, the balance of trade improved and inflation remained moderate at 15% – 18%, and oil exports increased. In May 1991, Assad's government liberalized the Syrian economy, which stimulated domestic and foreign private investment. Most of the foreign investors were Arab states of the Persian Gulf, as Western countries still had political and economic issues with Syria. The Gulf states invested in infrastructure and development projects. However, because of the Ba'ath Party's socialist ideology, Assad's government refused to privatize state-owned companies.

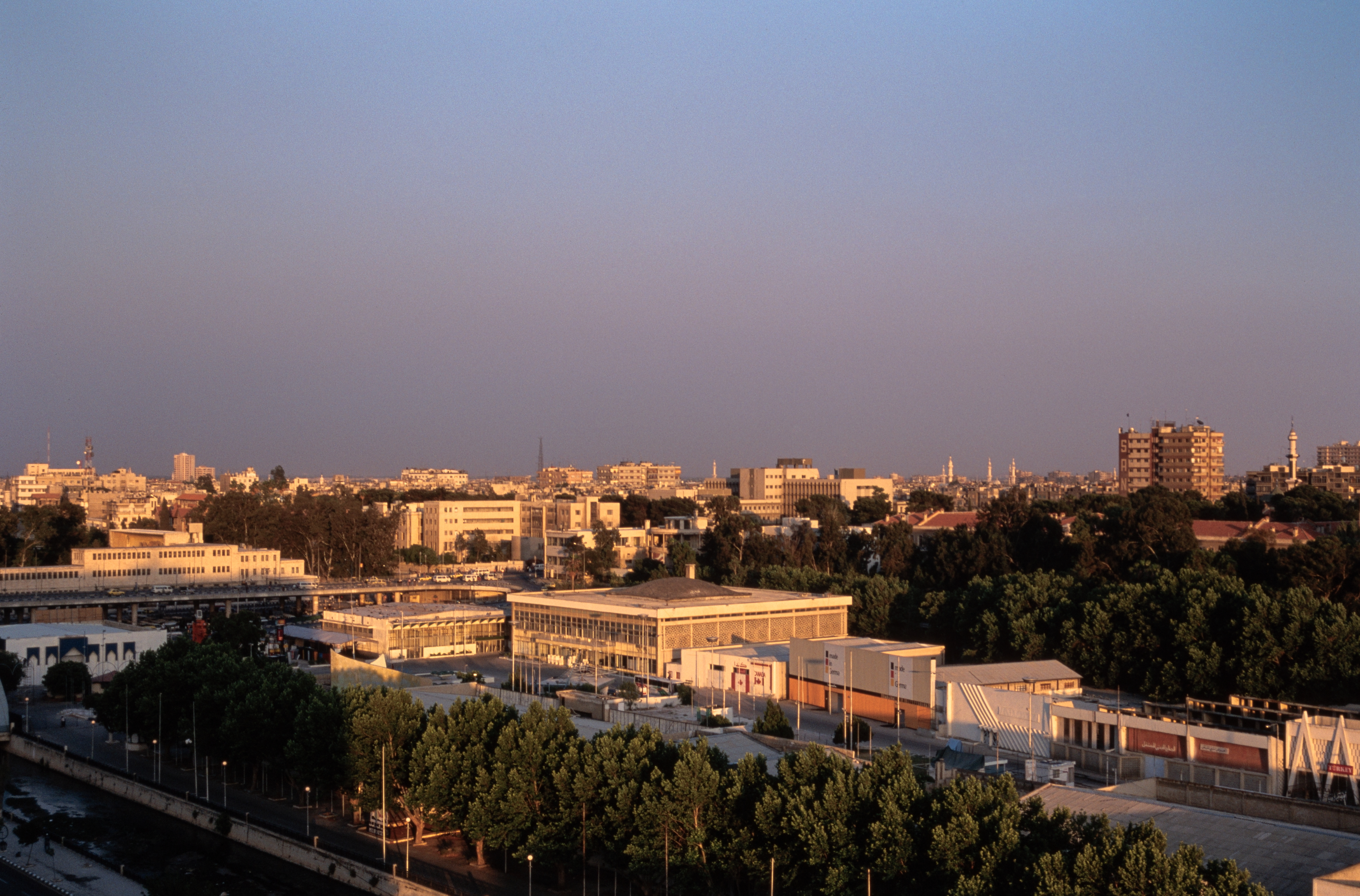
Damascus in 1995

In the mid-1990s, Syria entered another economic crisis due to a recession. In the late 1990s, Syria's economic growth was around 1.5%, which was insufficient as the population growth was between 3% and 3.5%, causing the GDP per capita to be negative. Another symptom of the crisis was statism in foreign trade. Syria's economic crisis occurred at a time of recession in world markets. A drop in the price of oil in 1998 caused a major blow to Syria's economy, but when the oil price rose in 1999, the Syrian economy experienced a partial recovery. In 1999, one of the worst droughts in a century caused further economic woes. It caused a drop of 25%–30% in crop yields compared with 1997 and 1998. Assad's government implemented emergency measures that included loans and compensation to farmers and distribution of fodder free charge in order to save sheep and cattle. However, those steps were limited and had no measurable effect on the economy.

Assad's government tried to decrease population growth, which caused economic problems, but this was only marginally successful. One sign of the economic stagnation was Syria's lack of progress in talks with the EU on the signing of an association agreement. The main cause of this failure was the difficulty of Syria meeting EU demands to open the economy and introduce reforms. Marc Pierini, head of the EU delegation in Damascus, said that if the Syrian economy was not modernized it could not benefit from closer ties to the EU. Nevertheless, Assad's government gave civil servants a 20% pay increase on the anniversary of the Corrective Movement which brought Assad to power. The foreign press criticized Syria's reluctance to liberalize its economy. Assad's government refused to modernize the bank system, allow private banks, and open a stock exchange.

=== Personality cult ===
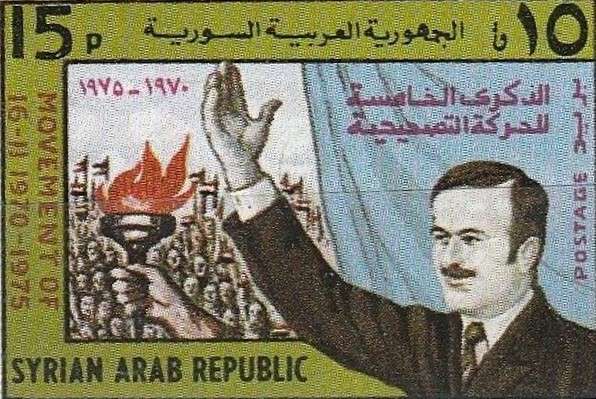
Syrian postage stamp commemorating the fifth anniversary of Assad's rise to power, 1975

Assad developed a state-sponsored cult of personality in order to maintain power. Because he wanted to become an Arab leader, he often represented himself as a successor to Egypt's Gamal Abdel Nasser, having risen to power in November 1970, a few weeks after Nasser's death. He modelled his presidential system on Nasser's, hailed Nasser for his pan-Arabic leadership, and in public he displayed photographs of Nasser alongside posters of himself.

Assad also demonstrated his admiration for Salah ad-Din, a Muslim Kurdish leader who in the 12th century unified the Muslim East and defeating the Crusaders in 1187 and subsequently conquered Jerusalem. Assad displayed a large painting of Salah ad-Din's tomb in Damascus in his office and issued a currency bill featuring Salah ad-Din. In his speeches and conversations, Assad frequently hailed Salah ad-Din's successes and his victory over the Crusaders while equating Israel with the Kingdom of Jerusalem, the Crusaders' state.

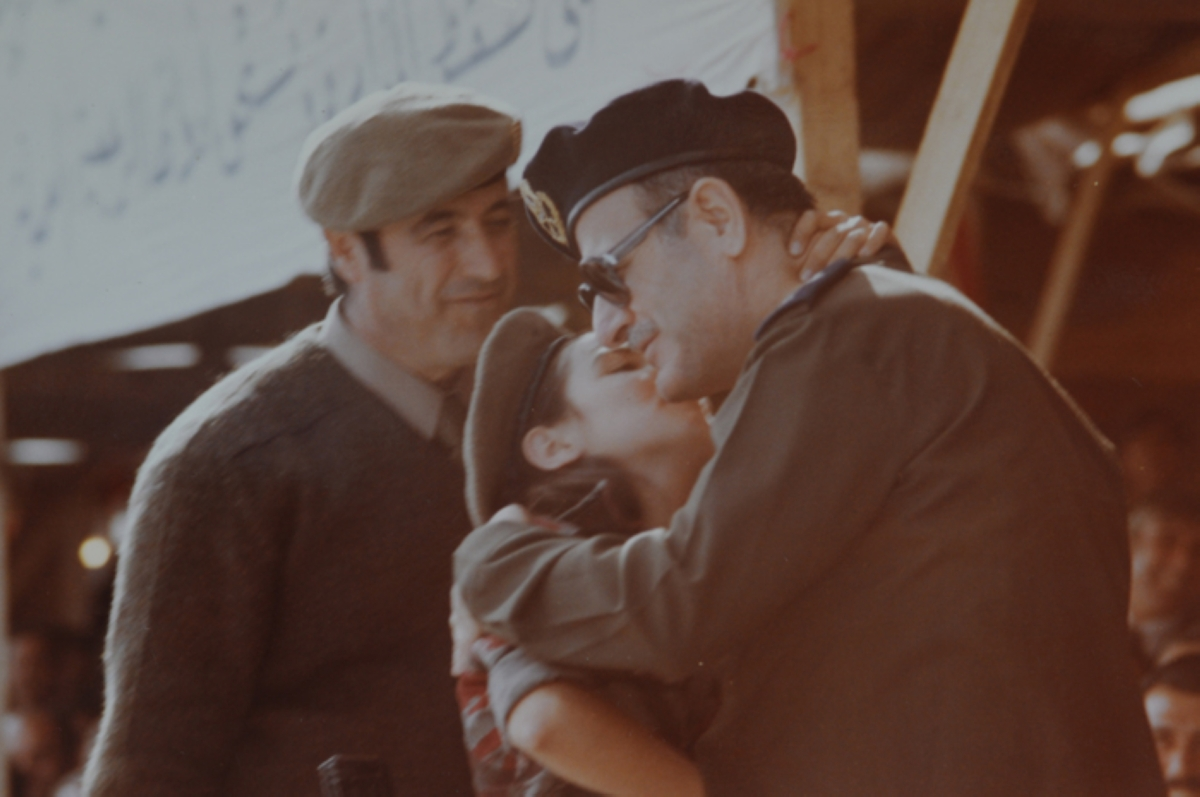
Hafez Assad during military ceremony. Propaganda made him into a kind of "father of the nation"

Portraits of Assad, often depicting him engaging in heroic activities, were placed in public spaces. He named numerous places and institutions after himself and members of his family. In schools, children were taught to sing songs of adulation about Hafez al-Assad. Teachers began each lesson with the song "Our eternal leader, Hafez al-Assad". Assad was sometimes portrayed with apparently divine properties. Sculptures and portraits depicted him alongside the prophet Mohammad, and after his mother's death, the government produced portraits of her surrounded by a halo. Syrian officials were made to refer to him as 'the sanctified one' (al-Muqaddas). This strategy was also pursued by Assad's son, Bashar al-Assad.

== Foreign policies ==
=== Federation of Arab Republics ===
==== Alliance with Egypt ====
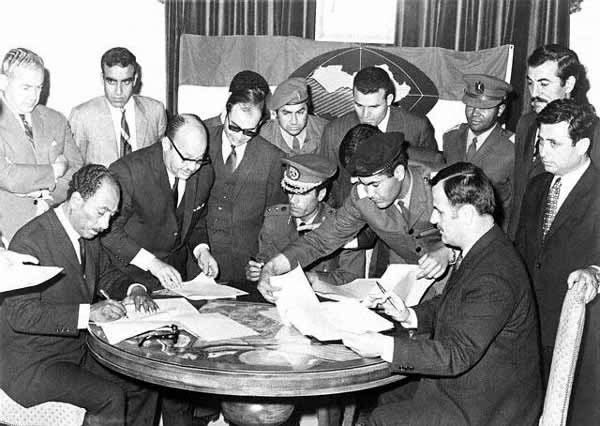
Assad (sitting on the right side) signing the Federation of Arab Republics in Benghazi, Libya, on 18 April 1971 with President Anwar al-Sadat (sitting left) of Egypt and Colonel Muammar al-Qaddafi of Libya (sitting in the centre).

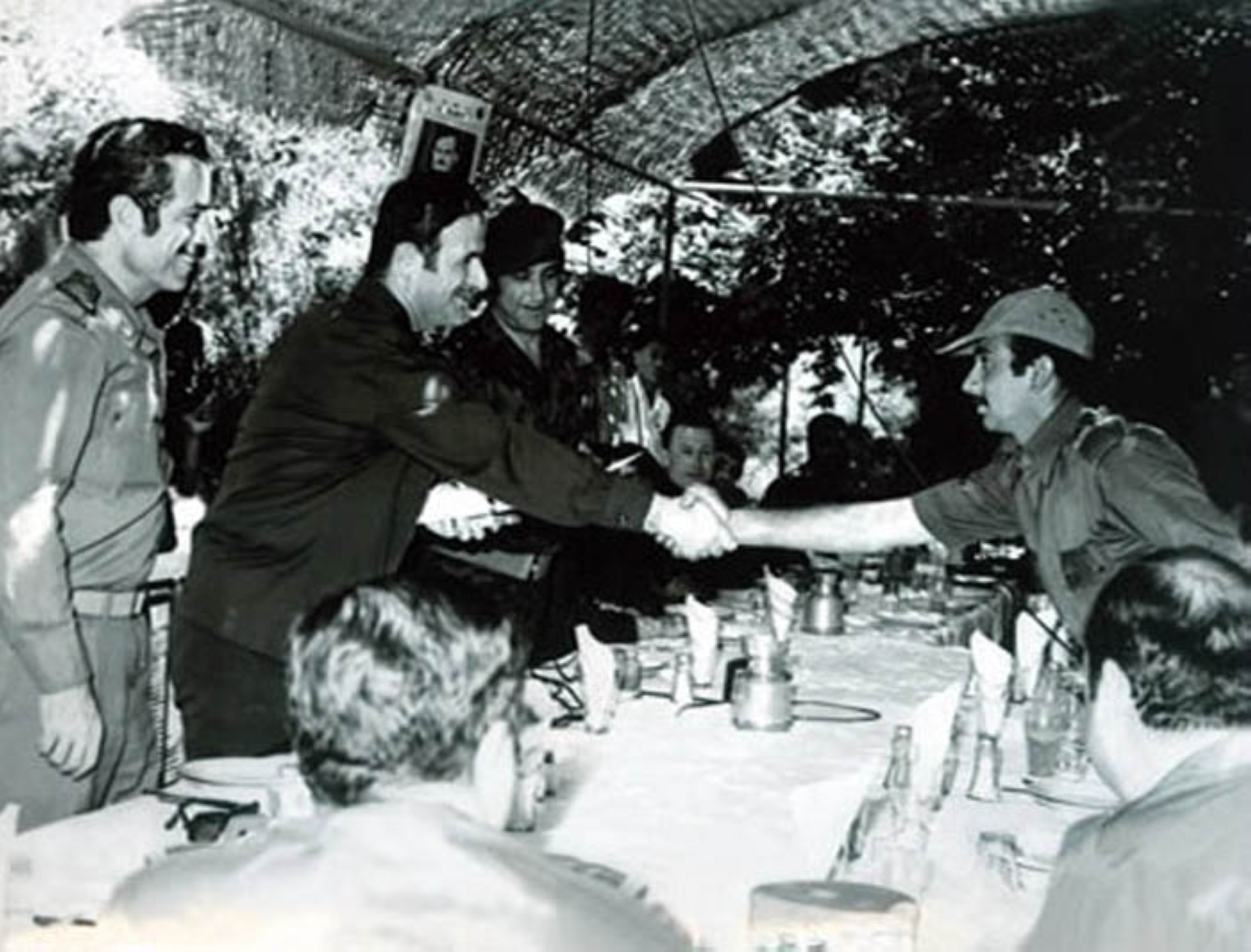
Hafez Assad with his army top generals.

Assad's domestic policy encountered serious difficulties and setbacks, and produced new problems and ill feelings, particularly among the Sunni urban classes; the orthodox section of these classes continued to oppose Assad's government for being a sectarian military dictatorship. The continued Muslim opposition to his government and the shortcomings of his socio-economic policies forced Assad's to focus primarily on Syria's regional affairs, namely intra-Arab and anti-Israeli policies. This tendency did not stem only from Assad's expectations to score quick and spectacular gains in his foreign policies at a time when the socio-economic issues of Syria required long-term and painstaking efforts without a promise of immediate positive results. In addition to his ambition to turn Syria into a regional power and to himself become a pan-Arab leader, Assad calculated that working for Arab unity and stepping up the struggle against Israel were likely to strengthen his legitimacy and leadership among the various sections of the Syrian population.

Assad's first foreign policy actions were to join the newly established Federation of Arab Republics along with Egypt, Libya and later Sudan, and to sign a military pact with Egypt. Assad gave a high priority to building a strong military and preparing it for a confrontation with Israel, both for offensive and defensive purposes and to enable him to politically negotiate the return of the Golan Heights from a position of military strength. He allocated up to 70 percent of the annual budget to the military build-up and received large quantities of modern arms from the Soviet Union.

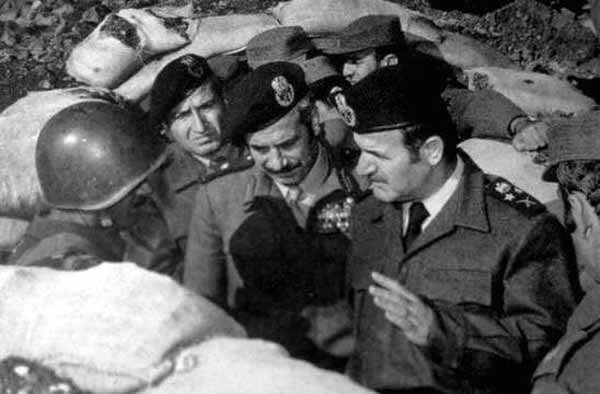
Assad and Defence Minister Mustafa Tlass, during the Arab–Israeli War of 1973, at the Golan front.

Once Assad had prepared his army, he was ready to join Anwar al-Sadat's Egypt in the Yom Kippur War in October 1973. Syria was defeated, but while Sadat signed unilateral agreements with Israel, Assad emerged from the war as a national hero in Syria and in other parts of the Middle East. This was due to his decision to go to war against Israel and Syria's subsequent war of attrition against the Israel Defense Forces in early 1974. Assad's skill as a negotiator in the post war period enabled him to gain the town of Kuneitra and the respect and admiration of many Arabs. Due to this many of his followers now regarded Assad as the new Pan-Arab leader, and a worthy successor of Gamal Nasser.

==== Early successes, late setbacks ====
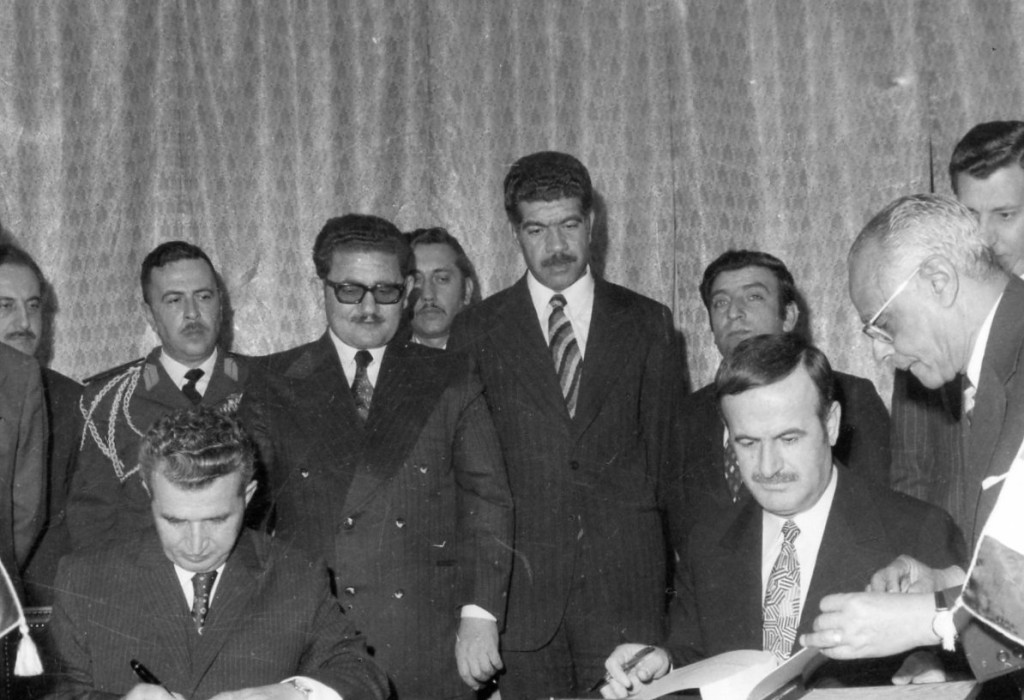
Hafez al-Assad signing bilateral documents with Nicolae Ceaușescu, dictator of Socialist Republic of Romania

While promoting himself as a historical leader in the style of Nasser and Salah ad-Din, Assad regarded his main goals to be Arab unity and an uncompromising struggle against Israel. The latter goal stemmed partly from Assad's need for legitimacy as an Alawite ruler of Syria who wished to present himself as a genuine Arab and Muslim leader. He had become convinced that Israel presented a severe threat to the integrity of the Arab nation from the Nile to the Euphrates, and that it was his historic mission to defend Arabdom. He regarded the confrontation with Israel as a zero-sum struggle, and as a strategist who understood power politics, he had sought to counterbalance Israeli military might with an all-Arab political-military alliance. After Sadat's Egypt left the alliance after the 1973 war, Assad sought during the middle-late 1970s to establish an alternative all-Arab alliance with Iraq, Jordan, Lebanon and the Palestine Liberation Organization, or PLO. However, he faced difficulties in reaching an understanding with Ba'athist Iraq, as he did not want to play a secondary role in an Iraqi-Syrian union. Assad returned to his goal to create a Greater Syria union or alliance with Jordan, Lebanon, and the PLO. During the period 1975 – 1980, Assad significantly advanced political, military, and economic cooperation with Jordan, extended his control over large parts of Lebanon, and intervened in the Lebanese Civil War, and sustained his strategic alliance with the PLO.

Assad also made significant gains in his relations with the superpowers. In 1974, he embarrassed the Soviet Union by negotiating with the United States regarding the military disengagement in the Golan Heights, and in 1976 he ignored Soviet pressure and requests to refrain from invading Lebanon and later to refrain from attacking the PLO and the Lebanese radical forces. Simultaneously, Assad renewed and markedly improved his relations with the United States and made presidents Richard Nixon and Jimmy Carter his great admirers.

However, neither Assad's international and regional achievements nor his domestic gains lasted long, and he soon showed sign of collapse because of his miscalculation and changing circumstances. His regional politics, which had earned him early political success, now became the main cause of his severe setbacks. Assad's direct intervention in Lebanon was a grave miscalculation, and within two years it turned from being an important asset to a grave liability, both regionally and domestically. Assad's maneuvers among the two main rival factions, playing one against other, alienated both. The PLO, experiencing Assad's blows in 1976, distanced itself from him and consolidated its autonomous infrastructure in southern Lebanon, paradoxically with Israel's indirect assistance, since Israel firmly objected to the deployment of Syrian troops south of the Sidon-Jazzin "red line".

==== After the dissolution of the FAR ====
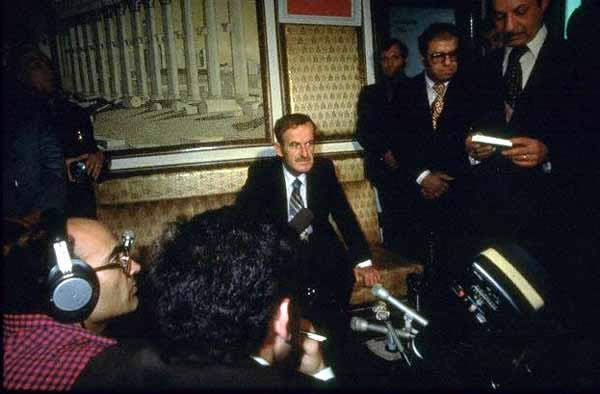
Assad enraged after Anwar Sadat asked him to visit Israel, 1977.

In 1978, the Christian Maronites, fearing Syrian domination, started a guerrilla war against Syrian troops in Beirut and Northern Lebanon. Israel's moral support and material aid contributed to the Maronites' autonomy and their resistance to Assad's de facto occupation of Lebanon. A newly formed Likud government in Israel developed political and military relations with the Maronite Lebanese Forces and contributed to the undermining of Assad's regional position. Israel welcomed Sadat's initiative in November 1977 and signed the Camp David Accords with Egypt and the United States in 1978, which was followed by the 1979 Egypt–Israel peace treaty.

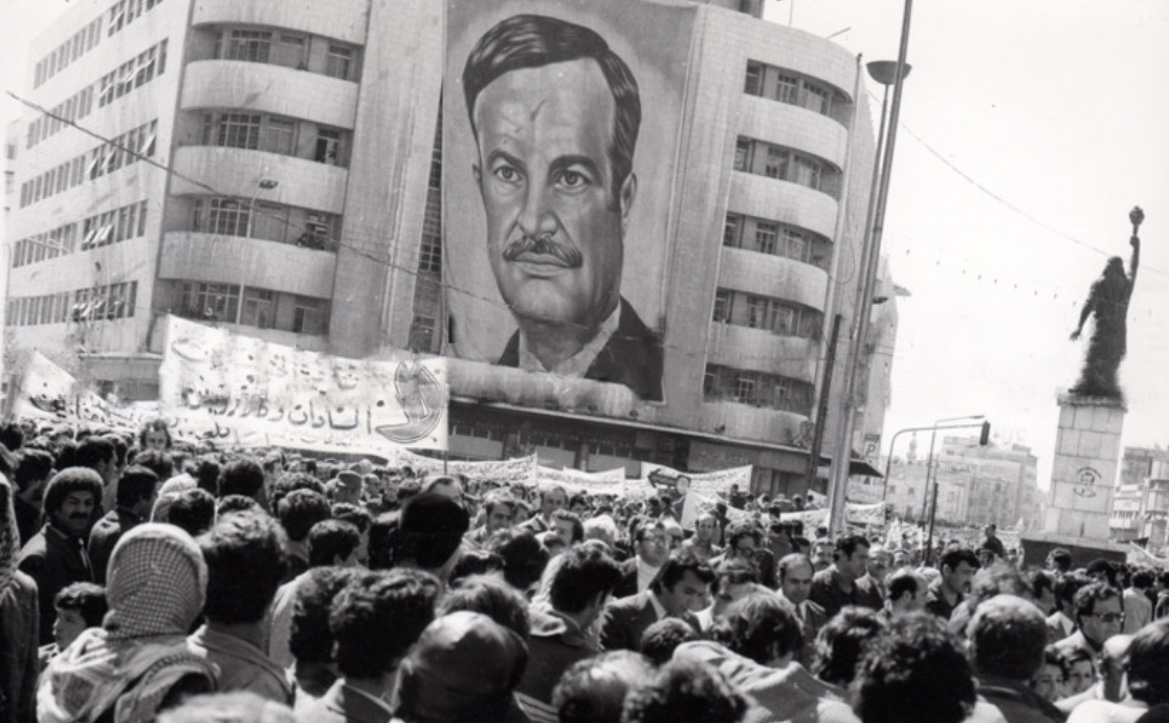
Anti Camp-David agreement demonstration in Damascus, 1978

Assad's regional strategic posture suffered serious blows as Egypt's withdrawal from the all-Arab confrontation against Israel exposed Syria to a growing Israeli threat. Apart from a short-lived rapprochement with the PLO, Assad became increasingly isolated in the region. His brief unity talks with Iraqi leaders collapsed in mid-1979; and with Iraq's 1980 involvement in the Iran–Iraq War, Iraq also effectively withdrew from the conflict against Israel. Also in 1979, under the impact of the Egypt–Israel Peace Treaty, and in view of Syria's regional predicament, King Hussein of Jordan withdrew from his association with Assad in favor of a closer relationship with Iraq. Assad's regional strategic position was further damaged when the US Carter administration abandoned its new Syrian-oriented policy in favor of the Egypt-Israeli peace process.

=== Major powers ===
==== European Union countries ====
Under Assad's government, Syria's relations with the countries of the European Union increased in importance, both economically and politically. Much of Syria's financial aid and foreign trade came from the EU, for example in 1992, 36.8% of Syria's imports and 47.9% of its exports were traded with the EU. Syria's political relations with the EU served as a counterbalance to the United States. Assad's Syria also tried to increase the influence of the EU in the Middle East. However, opposition from Israel and the United States prevented the EU's influence in the region. Syrias ministers visited a number of EU countries either because of the peace process or for economic reasons. Representatives of Netherlands, France, Portugal, and Germany visited Syria.

During the Lebanese Civil War, Syria's relations with France were tense, but eventually improved. France was still critical of Syria and demanded the reduction of its presence in Lebanon. The issue was resolved when France recognised Syria's central role in the region. In February 1992, French Foreign Minister Roland Dumas visited Damascus to discuss the Lebanese question and the peace process. In 1992, Syria's relations with Germany, previously cold, improved when Syria was involved in securing the release of two German hostages in Lebanon, which also improved its international image. Chancellor Helmut Kohl thanked Assad for his effort. German Foreign Minister Hans-Dietrich Genscher visited Syria in September 1992 to discuss the improvement of relations between the countries.

In late 1990s, Syria's relations with EU countries, which were economically significant, continued to slowly improve and allowed the country to gain some maneuverability regarding Israel. The country's international status was also bolstered.

==== Soviet Union and Russia ====
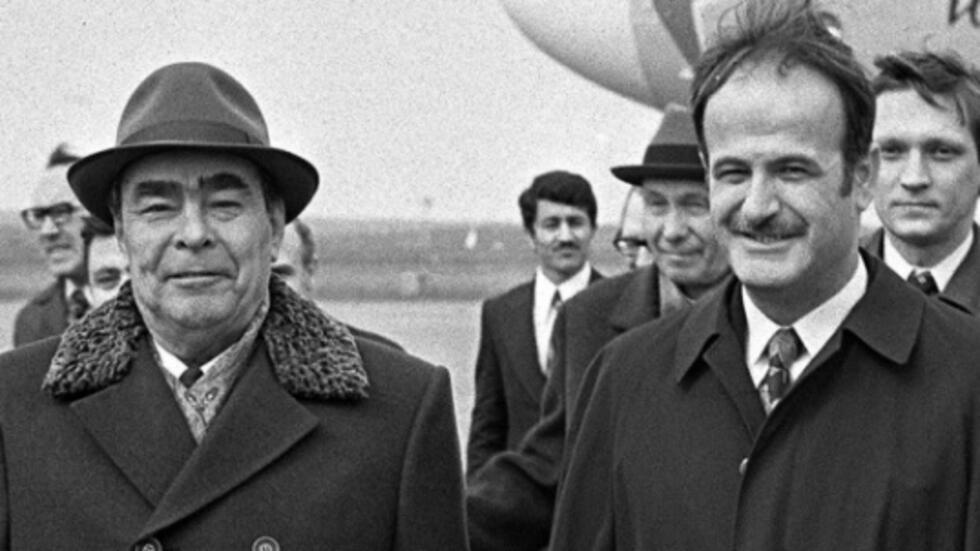
Assad with Soviet leader Brezhnev, 1974.

In the 1980s, Assad's government established a military cooperation with the Soviet Union. Sophisticiated Soviet arms and military advisers helped the development of the Syrian Army, which raised the tension between Israel and Syria. In November 1983, a Soviet delegation arrived in Damascus to discuss the opening of a Soviet naval base in the Syrian city of Tartus. The countries' relationship encountered problems: Syria had supported Iran during the Iran-Iraq War, while the Soviet Union supported Iraq, and when the rebellion against Yasser Arafat broke out in al-Fatah in 1983, Syria supported the rebels while the Soviet Union supported Arafat. In 1983 the Syrian Foreign Minister Abdul Halim Khaddam visited Moscow. Soviet Foreign Minister Andrey Gromyko argued that Syria and the Soviet Union must resolve their differences concerning the Palestinian movement as stopping the internal conflict would allow the "anti-Imperialist struggle."

During the diplomatic crisis between the United States and Syria, which escalated into minor clashes, Syrian counted on Soviet help if war should break out. Vladimir Yukhin, the Soviet ambassador in Damascus, expressed his country's appreciation "for the firm Syrian position in the face of Imperialism and Zionism." The Soviet attitude did not satisfy Syria completely. Assad's government considered entering the Warsaw Pact to gain Soviet support and to match the United States and Israel. Syria and the Soviet Union signed the Treaty of Friendship and Cooperation in October 1980, which was focused on cultural, technical, military, economic, and transport relations. This treaty included joint action in case any of the countries were attacked and forbade both Syria and the Soviet Union from joining any alliance that was against one of the signatories. Syria's efforts to improve the strategic relations with the Soviet Union meant that Syria was not completely satisfied with the current Treaty. Even before the Treaty was signed, the Soviet Union had backed the Arab countries in the Six-Day War of 1967 and the Yom Kippur War of 1973. During the 1982 Lebanon War, the Soviet Union kept a policy of low profile. The Soviets did not send arms or exert pressure to end the conflict. This damaged the prestige of the Soviet in the Middle East.

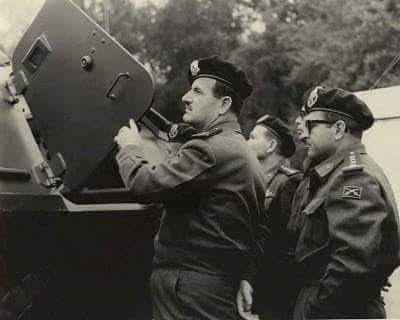
Assad inspects armored vehicle, supplied by the Soviet Union.

The strengthening of ties with the Soviet Union, and the increased Soviet military support and political backing were part of the Assad's policy of strategic balance with Israel. In 1983, during the power struggle between Assad's forces and his brother, Rif'at al-Assad, the Soviets supported Hafez al-Assad's Defense Minister Mustafa Tlass and were concerned about Rif'at's bid for power. When the Soviet leader Yuri Andropov died, Assad did not attended his funeral, but the Syrian official commentary stated that Andropov supported the Soviet-Syrian friendship and that both countries stressed their aspirations for strengthening their ties.

After 1987, because of internal changes and a political crisis, the Soviet Union was unable to support Syria. This impacted the relationship between the states and Syria reduced its support for the Soviet Union. Changes to the Soviet Middle East policy led to Syria changing its relations with Israel, which resulted in the mass emigration of Jews to Israel and a demand that Syria change its attitude on the conflict with Israel. Alexander Zotov, the Soviet Ambassador, said in November 1989 that Syria's change of foreign policy was necessary, that Syria should cease aspiring for a strategic balance with Israel and settle for "reasonable defensive sufficiency", and that the Soviet-Syrian arms trade would also be changed. The growing Syrian debt to the Soviet Union led to a reduction of the arms trade between the countries, and Syria turned to China and North Korea for its weapons supplies.

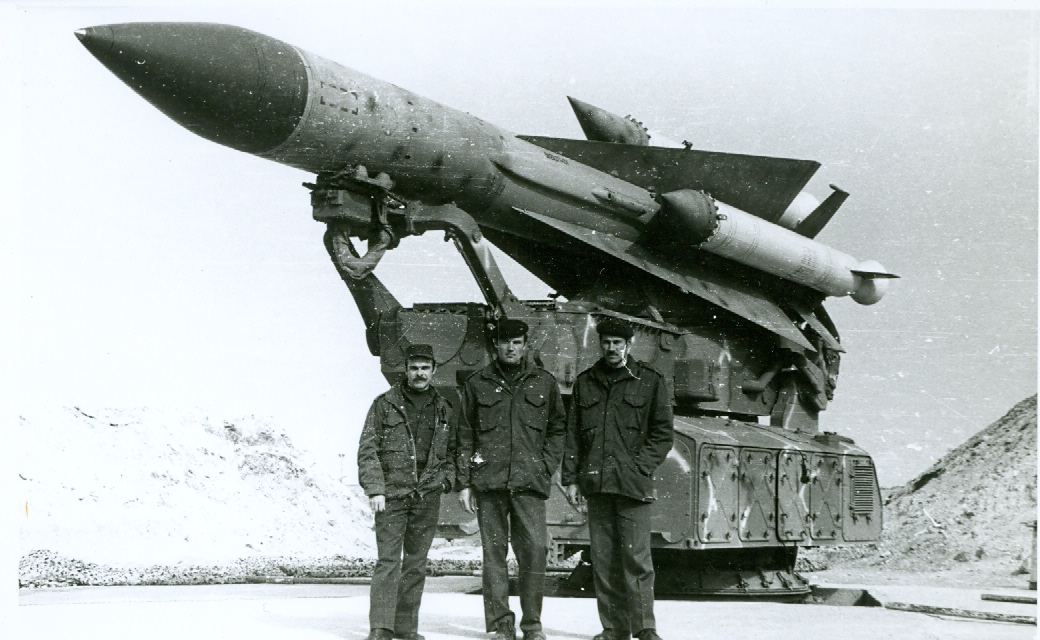
Soviet military instructors in Syria. Behind them stands an S-200 air defense system.

Between 27 and 29 April 1987, Assad, along with the Defense Minister Tlass and Vice President Khaddam, visited the Soviet Union. Assad stressed that Jewish emigration to Israel was an embarrassment to Syria and served to strengthen Israel. Radio Damascus denied claims that the Soviet Union and Syria were becoming distant and stated that the Assad's visit had renewed the momentum in the relations between the countries, consolidating their common view of the Arab–Israeli conflict. During the visit, Assad asked to acquire the S-300 missile system, but Mikhail Gorbachev refused to deliver, due to U.S. and Israeli rejection and Syrian accumulated debt from previous arms deals. The Syrian daily newspaper, Tishreen, stated that after this visit, the relation between the Soviet Union and Syria would be expanded. A few weeks after he returned from Moscow, Assad, in a speech to the National Federation of Syrian Students, said that the Soviet Union remained a firm friend of Syria and the Arabs, and that even though Mikhail Gorbachev and his government were preoccupied with internal affairs, they had not ignored external issues, especially those related to their friends. In 1990, 44.3% of Syrian exports were traded in the Soviet Union. Just before the collapse of the Soviet Union, the relationship between the countries changed. In April 1991, the Syrian Foreign Minister al-Sharaa visited the Soviet Union, the only visit that year. Soviet Foreign Ministers Alexander Bessmertnykh and Boris Pankin visited Syria in May and October, but those visits were in connection with the American Middle East peace initiative, accentuating the decline in the status of the Soviet Union in the region.

The collapse of the Soviet Union in December 1991 marked the end of the main source of Syria's political and military support for more than two decades. In 1992 the Commonwealth of Independent States and Russia were dependent upon the United States and made closer ties with Israel, which meant that Syria was unable to count on their support. Nevertheless, CIS countries were views as limited market and limited source for arms. The absence of high-level contracts between Russia and Syria enabled future development of the relations between the countries. Russia agreed to sell Syria arms under previous contracts with the Soviet Union and they demanded payment of Syria's US$10–12 billion debt. Syria refused to do so, claiming that Russia was not a successor state of the Soviet Union, but later agreed to pay part of the debt by exporting citrus fruit worth $US800 million.

Like other Arab countries, Syria worked to develop good relations with Muslim former Soviet countries. Syrian Foreign Minister Farouk al-Sharaa visited Kazakhstan, Uzbekistan, Turkmenistan, Tajikistan and Azerbaijan with limited results. At the same time, Syria established good relations with Armenia which has to be placed in the context of Syria's demographic composition which includes a large Armenian community.

On 6 July 1999, Assad visited Moscow. The visit was originally planned for March but Israeli Prime Minister Benjamin Netanyahu was visiting Moscow at the same time so Assad's visit was postponed. Assad finalized an arms deal worth $2 billion, and after the visit both sides stated that they would strengthen their trade ties. Assad commented upon Russia's growing importance, stating that he welcomed Russia's strengthening and hoped that their role would be more clearly and openly expressed. The United States warned Russia not to trade arms to Syria, but Russia stated that it would not yield to American threats.

==== United States ====
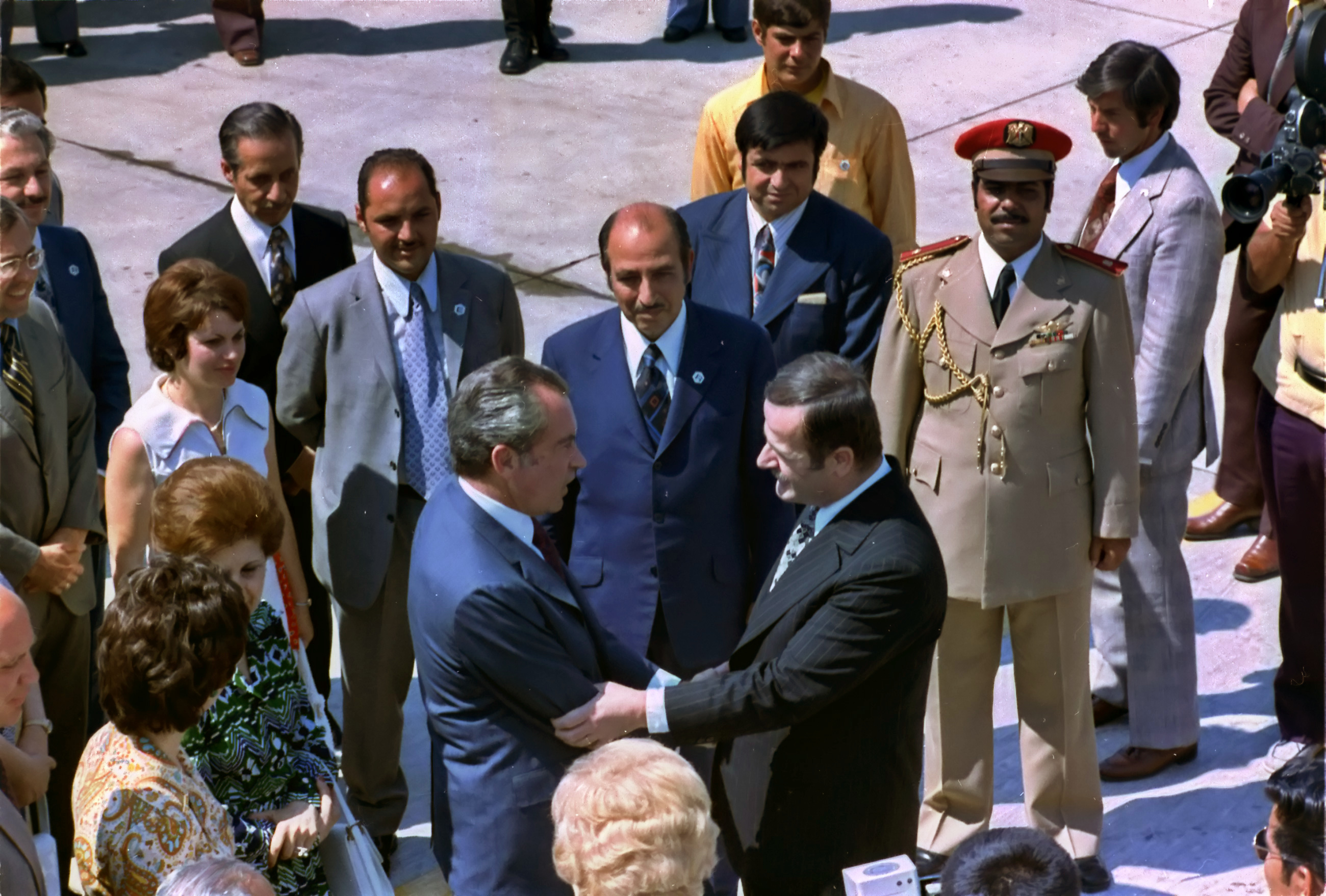
Assad greets President Nixon on his arrival at Damascus airport in 1974

In 1980s, the situation in Lebanon became a major problem between Assad's government and the United States. In October 1983, the headquarters of the American and French troops of the Multinational Force in Lebanon (MNF), was demolished in a suicide attack. Around 200 Americans were killed. Syria's ambassador in the US disclaimed any Syria's involvement but US officials thought differently so Congress passed an emergency bill canceling economic aid previously approved for Syria. It was later reported that Syria had provided support for the attack. Around 800 Shia extremists had been trained in Syria and Assad's cousin Adnan al-Assad had supervised the preparations for the attack. Syria decided to resist American and French if attacked. Syria's Defense Minister Mustafa Tlass said that Syria would launch suicide attacks on the US Sixth Fleet. In December 1983, when American planes pounded Syrian positions in the Biqa' valley, the Syrian air-defense system fought back. Two American airplanes were destroyed and one pilot was taken prisoner of war. Just before the attack, Israel's Prime Minister had visited Washington; Syria linked the American attack with the visit.

In the 1990s, Syria maintained good relations with the United States, but several problems prevented them establishing a friendly relationship. In April 1992, Syria allowed Jews to emigrate to Israel, which was welcomed by the Bush administration. Syria also showed its commitment to the peace process and requested US to take a more active part. However, relations between the countries were still characterized by mutual distrust and differences of opinion on key issues.

The US accused Syria of patronizing terrorist organizations. Despite Syria's efforts to portray itself as having dissociated itself from these groups, it was not removed from the list of countries sponsoring terrorist organizations that appeared in annual US Department report on "Patterns of Global Terrorism". In 1991, Syria was suspected of involvement in the destruction of Pan Am Flight 103 over Lockerbie in Scotland. The US government absolved Syria of responsibility but the US media continued to portray Syria as a suspect. Syria denied any involvement and protested its inclusion on the "Patterns of Global Terrorism" list. Assad's government continued to patronage organizations that operated against Israel, including Hezbollah, the Popular Front for Liberation of Palestine (PFLP), and the Popular Front for the Liberation of Palestine-General Command (PFLP-GC).

Assad met President Bill Clinton twice in 1994 in Syria, and 2000 in Geneva, Switzerland, where they discussed Israeli withdrawal from the Golan Heights, and Syrian presence in Lebanon, as a prelude to a comprehensive peace agreement in the Middle East.

=== Region ===
==== Egypt ====
Relations between Egypt in Syria were renewed in December 1989. In the 1990s, the countries enjoyed good relations with each other, as did their respective presidents, Hosni Mubarak and Assad. Syria tried to make Egypt its advocate to the United States and Israel, while Egypt tried to convince Syria to continue with the peace process. Syria also tried in vain to mediate between Egypt and Iran, a process mainly undertaken by Syrian Foreign Minister al-Sharaa. Relations between Egypt in Syria were not as good on a military or economic level. In 1999, relations between the countries became strained because of differences over the peace process. Assad and Mubarak met only once that year; during the past decade they had met every few months. Syria opposed Egypt's proposal to convene a summit of Arabic countries negotiating with Israel, as Syria was unwilling to be pressured into a dialog with Yasser Arafat. Later, Syria accused Egypt of seeking to promote negotiations with the Palestinians at Syrian expense.

==== Israel ====
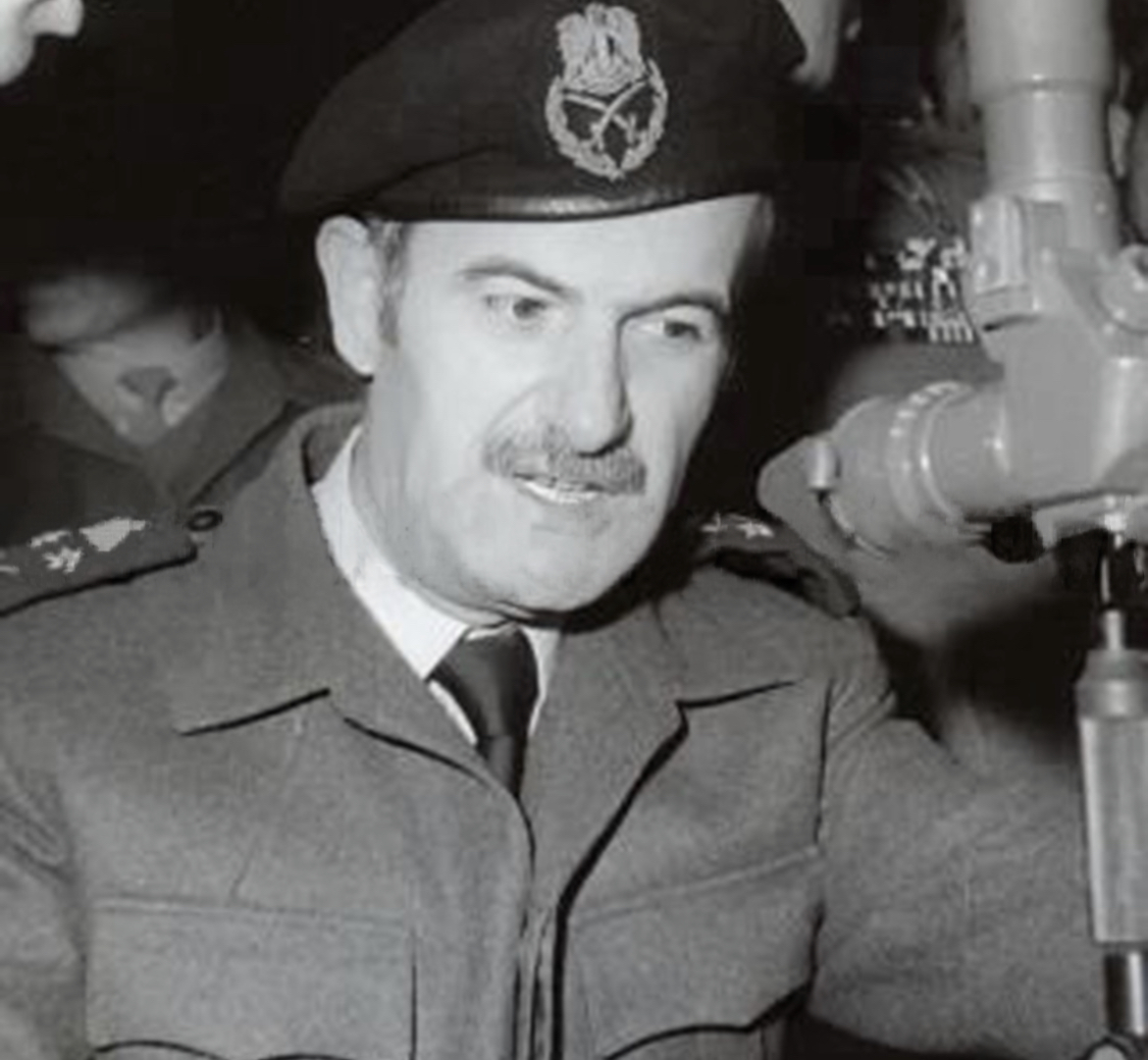
Assad on the front line during 1973 war against Israel.

Assad's foreign policy was largely shaped by Syria's attitude toward Israel. During his presidency, Syria played a major role in the 1973 Arab–Israeli war, which was presented by the Assad's government as a victory, although by the end of the war the Israeli army had invaded large areas of Syria and taken up positions 40 kilometres (25 mi) from Damascus. Syria later regained some territory that had been occupied in 1967 in the peace negotiations headed by Henry Kissinger. The Syrian government refused to recognise the State of Israel and referred to it as the "Zionist Entity." In the mid-1990s, Assad moderated his country's policy towards Israel as the loss of Soviet support altered the balance of power in the Middle East. Under pressure from the United States, Assad engaged in negotiations on the Israeli-occupied Golan Heights, but these talks failed. Assad believed that what constituted Israel, the West Bank, and Gaza were an integral part of southern Syria.

In 1980, Assad signed Syria's Treaty of Friendship and Cooperation with the Soviet Union. He continued to develop his new doctrine of Strategic Balance, which he had initiated the previous year. Aiming primarily at confronting Israel single-handedly, this doctrine engendered fresh intra-Arab policies and was directed toward consolidating Assad's domestic front, which had suffered setbacks since 1977.

Israel was the main target of Assad's terrorist and guerrilla operations in both Lebanon and Europe. Attempts to bomb an El-Al airliner in London in April 1986 and in Madrid in June 1986 were part of an attrition campaign that Assad had been directing against Israel to damage its economy, morale, and social fabric and weaken its military capacity. This campaign of attrition was an auxiliary tactic in Assad's policy of strategic balance with Israel developed by Assad in the late 1970s when Syria was largely isolated in the region and exposed to a potential Israeli threat. With the help of the Soviet Union, Assad built a large military equipped with modern tanks, airplanes and long-range ground-to-ground missiles capable of launching chemical warheads into most Israeli cities.

Although Assad was still far from achieving a strategic balance with Israel, his government reached military parity in quantitative terms. This enabled him to deter Israel from attacking Syria and in the event of war, to cause heavy losses to Israel. It also gave him an option to retake the Golan Heights by a surprise attack. Assad's enormous military power also enabled him to sustain some of his major political gains in the region and at home. However, he was not content with his military buildup, and continued to also employ his skills as a strategist and manipulator in order to advance his prime regional policy to gain support from all Arabs for his assumed role as a leader of the Arab struggle against Israel, while further isolating Egypt and counterbalancing the growing power of Iraq, Syria's major Arab rivals in the region.

Although Syria had good relations with the Soviet Union, Assad began to turn towards the West in late-1980s, having seen how Iraq had benefited during its war with Iran. He agreed to join the United States-led coalition against Iraq in the Gulf War in 1991. He continued to regard Israel as major regional enemy. At the end of the 1991 Middle East peace conference, Assad insisted on a "land for peace" deal, demanding Israel's withdrawal from the Golan Heights. Assad regarded the September 1993 Israeli accord with the PLO—which ended the first intifada (resistance) in the Occupied Territories without giving the Palestinians any substantial gains—and the increasingly friendly relationship between Israel and Jordan as set-backs.

==== Iran ====
In 1978 when Ayatollah Ruhollah Khomeini was forced to leave Iraq where he had been in exile since 1963, Assad suggested him refuge in Damascus. Assad regarded the Islamic revolution in Iran in February 1979 as an opportunity to further implement his policies. Although he was against any Islamic movement, but as the Iranian one was a Shia movement he found an ally in the new Iranian government. The new government of Ayatollah Khomeini in Iran promptly abolished Iran's ties with Israel and Egypt and turned hostile towards these states. Assad established an alliance with Iran, whose political and social principles — except those concerning Israel and the United States — were dramatically opposed to Ba'athist doctrines. Assad consistently extended military and diplomatic assistance to Iran during the Iran–Iraq War in order to secure legitimacy and support for his rule in Syria and his policies in Lebanon. He used the potential threat from Iran to manipulate Arab states in the Persian Gulf into continuing their financial and diplomatic support for Syria, weakening and possibly toppling the Iraqi government, and subsequently employing Iraq and Iran for "strategic depth" and as allies in Syria's confrontation with Israel, thus emerging as leader of the all-Arab struggle against Israel. Assad repeated that the Iran–Iraq war should not have occurred since it was waged against a potential ally of the Arabs and diverted the Arabs' attention, resources, and efforts from their real enemy, Israel. According to Assad, most Arab countries had been wrongly led to support Iraq in an unnecessary war against Iran, rather than support Syria in its vital national-historical struggle against Israel.

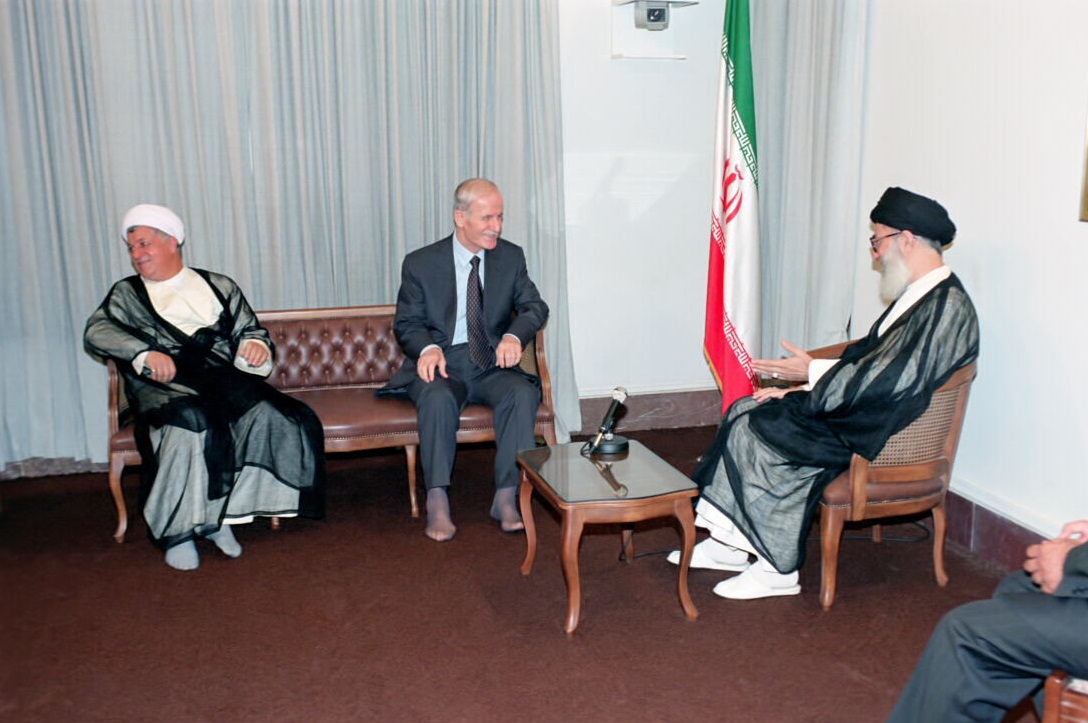
Assad visiting Iran, 1997.

However, except for securing Arab financial support and verbal commitments, and obtaining large quantities of free and discounted Iranian oil, Assad failed to achieve the goals of his Gulf strategy; instead it further worsened Syria's regional position. The growing Iranian threat to Iraq, which Assad indirectly fueled, brought Egypt back to the Arab cause and many Arabs agreed with Egypt's peace treaty with Israel. A new alliance developed between Egypt and Iraq, Syria became further isolated, and the Iraqi government — whose leaders developed feelings of hatred and revenge towards Assad — consolidated itself. Syria's relationship with Iran during the war was under pressure. Iran's threats to take Iraqi territory caused Syria to not object the loss of Arab territory. In early 1986, Syrian Foreign Minister Farouk al-Sharaa said that Iran had confirmed that Iraqi territory would not be taken and al-Sharaa called Iran's refusal to end the war "crazy". Soon afterward, Iran occupied the Al-Faw peninsula in Iraq, damaging Syria's credibility. Another blow was Iran's offensive on Basra in late 1986 and early 1987. Between May and June 1986, Jordan and Saudi Arabia mediated between the Syrian and Iraqi Ba'ath parties. Mediation was arranged due to Iran's threats to cut off oil supplies to Syria, as Syria was unable to pay Iran. Assad said that he was also interested in a dialog with Iraq. Saudi Arabia and other Arab countries tried to persuade Assad to reach an agreement with Iraq and reopen its pipeline to the Mediterranean, which traverses Syria.

==== Iraq ====
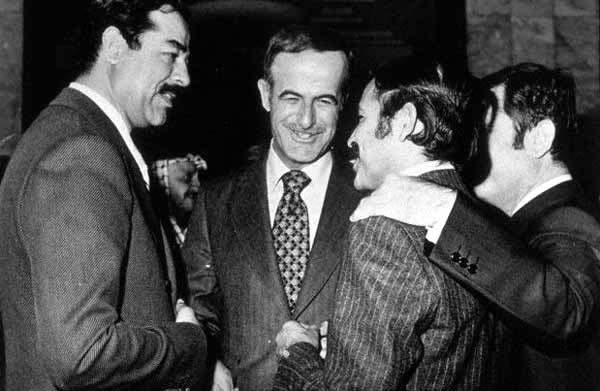
Hafez al-Assad (centre) with Iraqi President Saddam Hussein (left), Algerian Foreign Minister Abdelaziz Bouteflika (right), and Syrian Vice-President Abd al-Halim Khaddam (far right, half-covered) in 1979.

Even though Iraq was ruled by another branch of the Ba'ath Party, Assad's relations with Saddam Hussein were extremely strained, mainly because of Assad's support for Iran during the Iraq-Iran war, which Saddam was unable to forgive.However, Saddam had dispatched Iraqi army tanks to Damascus in order to help Syria prevent the Israel Defence Forces from taking control of the city in 1973. This entry of Iraq, then considered the leading Arab nation both economically as well as militarily, into Syria marks the first and, to date, only time in Syrian history where a foreign Arab army has entered its land. Assad had supported Iran in the war, and Iran found another ally in the Kurds in Iraq, who assisted Iran's offensive at northern Iraq.

Massoud Barzani, a Kurdish leader, hoped that Khomeini would give the territory to the Kurds, but Khomeini decided to incorporate it into the Islamic Supreme Council of Iraq. Barzani was not satisfied so he aligned with Assad's Syria, while Assad was also patronizing Jalal Talabani. Talabani had lived in Syria since the 1970s and Assad believed he could benefit from his ties with Syria. Talabani stated that he would not forget the support given to him by Assad. This was one of Assad's efforts to expand Syria's zone of influence to Iraq. By receiving Barzani, Assad gained the support of Kurds, thus decreasing Iran's chances to expand its influence over Iraq. However, after the end of the Iran-Iraq War, the Iraqi Kurds were still in close relations with Iran.

During the Islamist uprising in Syria, the Iraqi government had provided arms as well as logistical support to the Muslim Brotherhood, particularly during the 1982 Hama massacre.

Assad also participated in the coalition formed to force Iraq from Kuwait in the 1991 Gulf War; however Syria-Iraq relations started to improve in 1997 and 1998 when Israel started to develop a strategic partnership with Turkey.

==== Jordan ====
Assad had cold relations with Jordan. Syria under Assad had long history of attempts to destabilize King Hussein's regime and a regular onslaught of official insults emanated from Damascus towards Amman. Both countries supported the other's opposition forces in order to destabilize each other. In 1979's Islamic uprising in Syria, Jordan supported the Muslim Brotherhood. Assad accused King Hussein of supporting them,defeated the Islamists and sent Syrian troops to the Jordanian border. In December 1980, some Arab newspapers reported that Syrian jets attacked Muslim Brotherhood bases in Jordan. Saudi Arabia mediated in order to calm the two countries. Syria's hostility towards Jordan was partly fueled by Jordan's good relationship with Iraq. During the Iraq-Iran War, Syria and Jordan supported different sides. Not even the threat of war with Syria prevented King Hussein from supporting Iraq; however, the rest of the Arab States of the Persian Gulf did the same. In October 1998, Syria's Defense Minister Mustafa Tlass stated that "there is no such country as Jordan. Jordan was merely south Syria". However, when King Hussein died in February 1999, Assad attended his funeral, after which relations between Syria and Jordan started to improve. Hussein's successor, King Abdullah visited Syria in April 1999, which was described as a "turning point" in the relationship between two countries.

==== Lebanon ====
Syria deployed troops to Lebanon in 1976 during the Lebanese Civil War as part of the Arab Deterrent Force. The military intervention had been requested by the Lebanese President Suleiman Frangieh, as Lebanese Christian fears had been greatly exacerbated by the Damour massacre. Syria responded by ending its prior affiliation with the Palestinian Rejectionist Front and began supporting the Maronite-dominated government.

In 1976, Assad received strong criticism and pressure from across the Arab world for his involvement in the Tel al-Zaatar massacre of Palestinians - this criticism, as well as the internal dissent it caused as an Alawite ruler in a majority Sunni country, led to a cease-fire in his war on the Palestinian militia forces inside Lebanon.

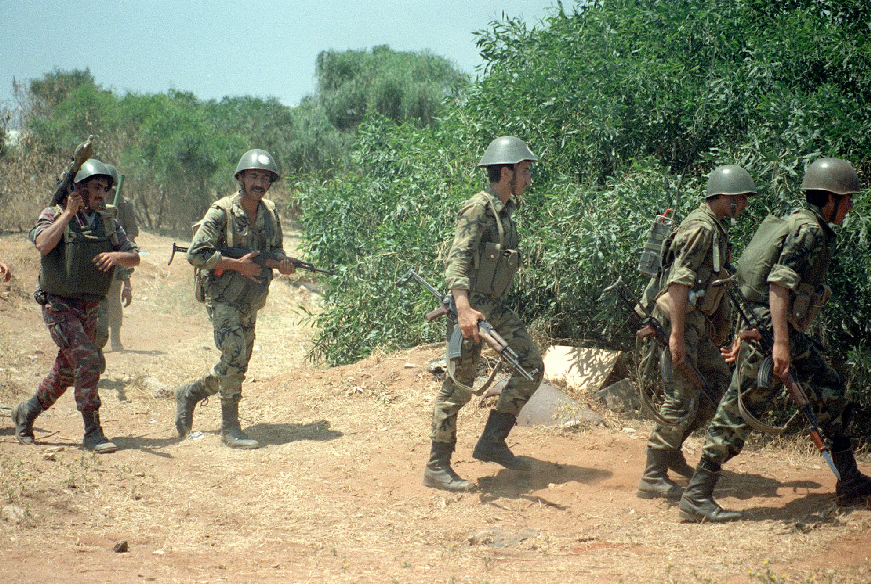
Syrian soldiers in Lebanese Beqaa valley.

Assad used terrorism and intimidation to extend his control over Lebanon. Jumblatt was assassinated in 1977, and Syria was accused of ordering it, and in 1982 Syrian assassins killed Bachir Gemayel, the pro-Israeli Lebanese President, both of whom had resisted Assad's attempts to dominate Lebanon. Using similar tactics, Assad brought about the abolition of the 1983 Lebanon–Israel agreement, and through guerrilla warfare carried out by proxy in 1985, Assad indirectly caused the Israel Defense Forces to withdraw to southern Lebanon. Terrorism against Palestinians and Jordanian targets in the mid-1980s contributed to thwart the rapprochement between King Hussein of Jordan and the PLO and the slowing down of Jordanian-Israeli political cooperation in the West Bank.

The Syrian occupation ended in 2005, due to UN resolution 1559, after the Rafiq Hariri assassination and the 14 March protests.

==== Libya ====
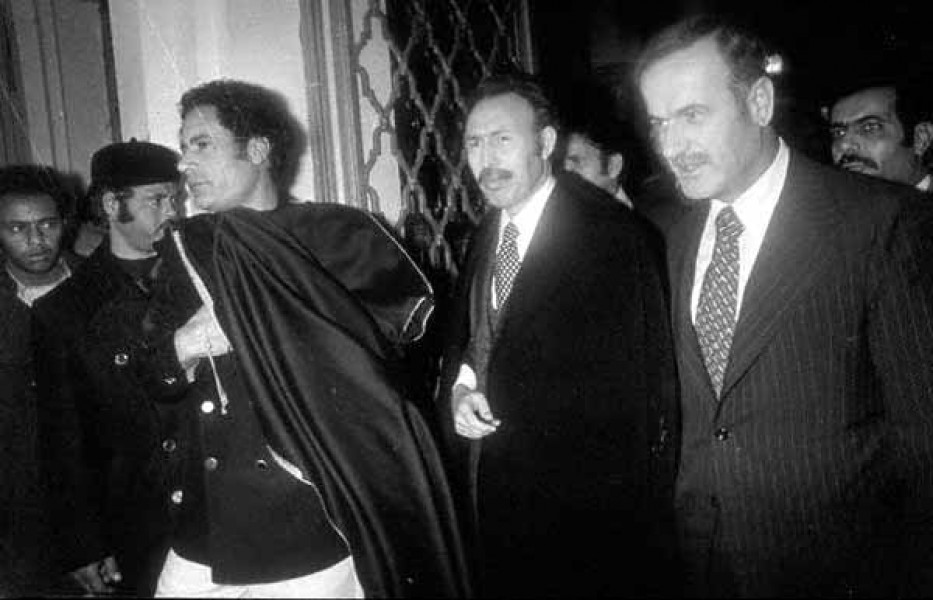
Libyan leader al-Gaddafi, Algerian president Boumedienne and Syrian president Assad at the Steadfastness and Confrontation Front summit in Tripoli, December 1977.

Throughout 1970, Libya's leader Muammar Gaddafi and Egypt's President Sadat were involved in the negotiations about the union between Egypt and Libya. Assad — at the time Lieutenant General — expanded the negotiations on Syria in September 1970 when in Libya. In April 1971, the three leaders announced the Federation of Arab Republics between Libya, Syria, and Egypt. When the Yom Kippur War started in 1973, Libya opposed its direction and criticized Egypt and Syria for restricted objectives. Libya was also unhappy with being sidelined. Nevertheless, Libya supported the war and had stationed troops in Egypt before it began. When the Arab countries lost the war and ceasefire negotiations started, Gaddafi was infuriated. After the war Gaddafi criticized Sadat and Assad for not consulting him before the war. Egypt's marginalization of Libya and acceptance of the Camp David accords led Libya to adopt a more hostile stance against Egypt. Eventually, Libya improved its relations with Syria, which also opposed Egypt after the Camp David accords.

Gaddafi tried to expand the Arab unity to states to the west of Libya. After he failed in 1974 to form a union with Tunisia and Egypt, Gaddafi again turned to Assad. In September 1980, Assad agreed to enter another union with Libya, which occurred when both countries were diplomatically isolated. As part of the agreement, Libya paid the Syrian debt of US$1 billion owed to the Soviet Union for weapons. The union confounded Gaddafi's pan-Arab ambitions. In the same month, the union was formed, the Iran-Iraq War broke out and Syria and Libya were the only Arab states to support Iran.

In 1992, during the crisis between Libya and the West, despite long years of friendship between Assad and Gaddafi, Syria refrained from any non-verbal support for Libya. In order to get more support from Syria, Gaddafi sent a delegation to Damascus in January 1992, headed by Colonel Mustafa al-Kharubi. In March, while Assad was visiting Egypt, he met with a Libyan representative to the Arab League. Later in the same month, Abuzed Omar Dorda, secretary of the Libyan General People's Committee, also visited Damascus. However, Syria could do no more than to denounce the United Nations Security Council resolution imposing sanctions on Libya, condemning it as unjustified provocation in view of what Syria considered to be a double standard applied by the international community toward Libya and Israel. Once the sanctions were in force on 15 April, Syria announced that it would violate the embargo and maintain air contacts with Libya. However, American pressure and Syria's technical inability to send flights to Libya caused them to reverse the decision.

==== Turkey ====
During Assad's presidency, Syria's relations with Turkey were tense. The problem of Hatay had existed since its annexation by Turkey in 1939. A more important issue between the countries was water supply and Syria's support to the Kurdistan Workers' Party (PKK) and the Armenian Secret Army for the Liberation of Armenia (ASALA). Turkey was a member of NATO, while Syria was allied to the Soviet Union; the Cold War was a guarantor to the status quo. After the Cold War ended, the issue of Hatay came to prominence.

Assad offered help to the PKK enabled it to receive training in the Beka'a' Valley in Lebanon. Abdullah Öcalan, one of the founders of the PKK, openly used his villa in Damascus as a base for operations. Turkey threatened to cut off all water supplies to Syria. However, when the Turkish Prime Minister or President sent a formal letter to the Syrian leadership requesting it to stop supporting the PKK, Assad ignored them. At that time, Turkey could not attack Syria due to its low military capacity near the Syrian border, and advised the European NATO members to avoid becoming involved in Middle East conflicts in order to avoid escalating the West's conflict with the Warsaw Pact states, since Syria had good relations with the Soviet Union. However, after the end of the Cold War, Turkish military concentration on the Syrian border increased. In mid-1998, Turkey threatened Syria with military action because of Syrian aid to Öcalan, and in October it gave Syria an ultimatum. Assad was aware of the possible consequences of Syria's continuing support to the PKK. Turkey was militarily powerful while Syria had lost the support of the Soviet Union. The Russian Federation was not willing to help; neither was it capable of taking strong measures against Turkey. Facing a real threat of military confrontation with Turkey, Syria signed the Adana Memorandum in October 1998, which designated the PKK as a terrorist organization and required Syria to evict it from its territory. After the PKK was dissolved in Syria, Turkish-Syrian political relations improved considerably, but issues such as water supplies from the Euphrates and Tigris rivers and Hatay remained unsolved.

Syrian presidential administrations
Preceded by Ahmad al-Khatib (acting)	Hafez al-Assad	Succeeded by Bashar al-Assad
