= Hafez al-Assad government =

1970–1971 Syrian government

- 76th government of the Syrian Arab Republic

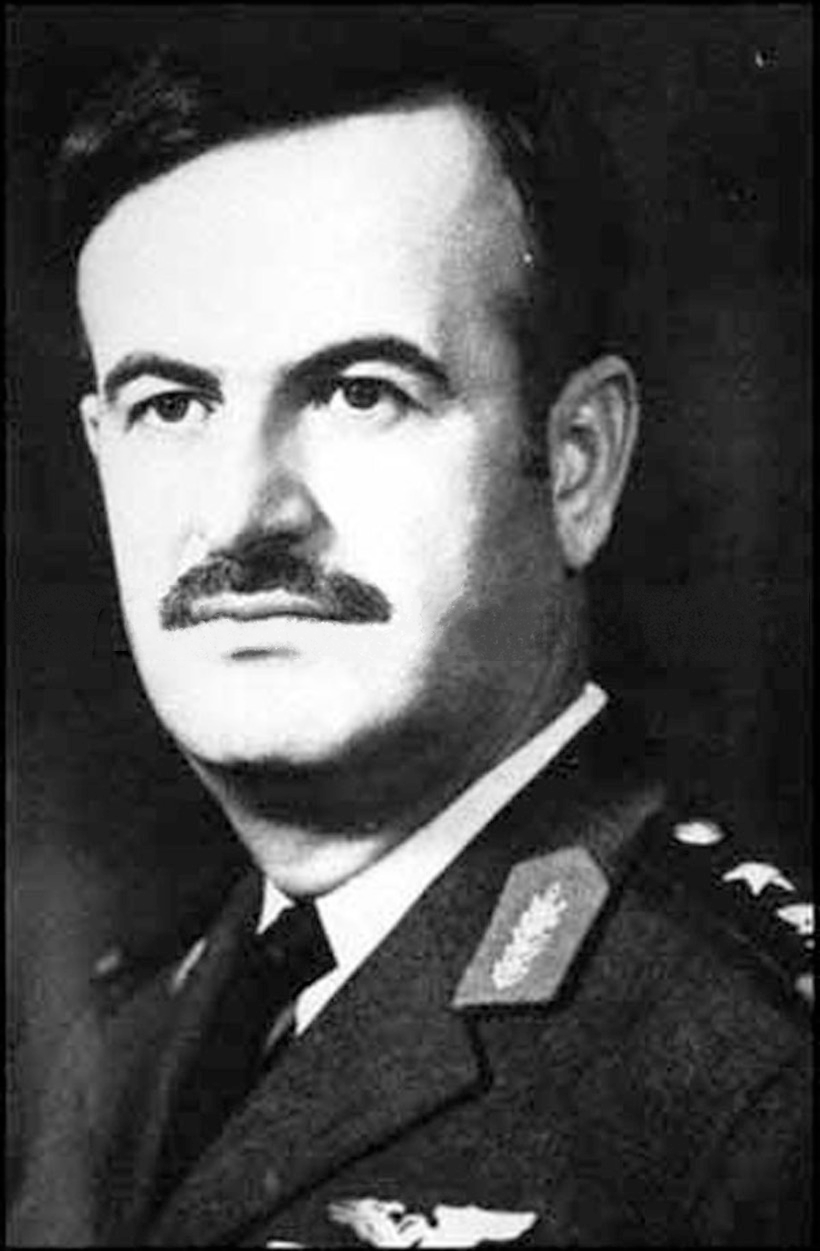
- Date formed: 21 November 1970
- Date dissolved: 3 April 1971

People and organisations
- President: Ahmad al-Khatib (acting); Hafez al-Assad
- Prime Minister: Hafez al-Assad
- Deputy Prime Ministers: Muhammad Talab Hilal; Mahmoud al-Ayyubi; Abdul Halim Khaddam
- Total no. of members: 26
- Member parties: ▌Ba'ath; ▌ASU; ▌SCP; ▌ASM; ▌SUP

History
- Incoming formation: 1970 coup d'etat
- Predecessor: N. al-Atassi
- Successor: Khleifawi I

The Hafez al-Assad government was the seventy-sixth government since the establishment of the modern Syrian state in 1918. Formed on 21 November 1970 by Decree No. 2616, it was the first government established following the Corrective Revolution that brought Hafez al-Assad to power. The government remained in office until 3 April 1971 and marked the beginning of the political era that would dominate Syria for the next three decades.

Following the overthrow of the government of Nureddin al-Atassi, al-Assad appointed Ahmad al-Khatib as Head of State while assuming the offices of Prime Minister and Minister of Defence himself. The government was tasked with consolidating the new political order established by the Corrective Movement and strengthening the authority of the new leadership within the state and the Ba'ath Party.

On 22 February 1971, Hafez al-Assad was elected President of the Republic, while continuing to serve simultaneously as Prime Minister and Minister of Defence. On 3 April 1971, he appointed Major General Abdul Rahman Khleifawi as Prime Minister, ending the tenure of his first government.

== Composition ==
Portfolio	Minister	Took office	Left office	Party
Prime Minister	Hafez al-Assad	21 November 1970	3 April 1971	Ba'ath Party
Minister of Defense	Hafez al-Assad	1 March 1966	3 April 1971	Ba'ath Party
Deputy Prime Minister	Muhammad Talab Hilal	21 November 1970	3 April 1971	Ba'ath Party
Deputy Prime Minister	Abdul Halim Khaddam	21 November 1970	3 April 1971	Ba'ath Party
Deputy Prime Minister	Mahmoud al-Ayyubi	21 November 1970	3 April 1971	Ba'ath Party
Minister of Agriculture and Agrarian Reform	Muhammad Talab Hilal	21 November 1970	3 April 1971	Ba'ath Party
Minister of Foreign Affairs	Abdul Halim Khaddam	21 November 1970	3 April 1971	Ba'ath Party
Minister of Education	Mahmoud al-Ayyubi	29 May 1969	3 April 1971	Ba'ath Party
Minister of Health	Daoud al-Radawi	29 May 1969	3 April 1971	
Minister of Public Works	Abd al-Ghani Qanut	21 November 1970	3 April 1971	Arab Socialist Movement
Minister of Water Resources	Abd al-Ghani Qanut	21 November 1970	3 April 1971	Arab Socialist Movement
Minister of State for Planning Affairs	Sami Soufan	21 November 1970	3 April 1971	Socialist Unionist
Minister of Higher Education	Shakir al-Fahham	21 November 1970	3 April 1971	Ba'ath Party
Minister of Oil, Mineral Resources and Electricity	Mustafa Haddad	21 November 1970	3 April 1971	
Minister of State for Endowments	Ghalib Abdoun	1 March 1966	3 April 1971	
Minister of State	Fayez Ismail	21 November 1970	3 April 1971	Socialist Unionist
Minister of State	Youssef Faisal	21 November 1970	3 April 1971	Syrian Communist Party
Minister of Supply and Internal Trade	Suhail al-Ghazzi	21 November 1970	3 April 1971	
Minister of Information	Naji al-Darawsheh	21 November 1970	3 April 1971	Ba'ath Party
Minister of Finance	Nourallah Nourallah	29 May 1969	3 April 1971	
Minister of Culture, Tourism and National Guidance	Fawzi Kayyali	21 November 1970	3 April 1971	ASU
Minister of Municipal and Rural Affairs	Mahmoud Qanbaz	21 November 1970	3 April 1971	
Minister of Economy and Foreign Trade	Mustafa al-Hallaj	21 November 1970	3 April 1971	
Minister of Justice	Adib al-Nahwi	21 November 1970	3 April 1971	
Minister of Interior	Abdul Rahman Khleifawi	21 November 1970	3 April 1971	Ba'ath Party
Minister of Transportation	Omar al-Sibai	21 November 1970	3 April 1971	Syrian Communist Party
Minister of Industry	Abdul Latif Qteit	21 November 1970	3 April 1971	
Minister of the Euphrates Dam	Munir Wannous	21 November 1970	3 April 1971	
Minister of State for Council of Ministers Affairs	Adnan Baghjati	21 November 1970	3 April 1971	Ba'ath Party
Minister of State for Frontline Villages Affairs	Ahmad Qabalan	21 November 1970	3 April 1971	Ba'ath Party
Minister of Social Affairs and Labour	Mut'eb Shanan	21 November 1970	3 April 1971	Ba'ath Party

== See also ==
- Council of Ministers (Syria)
- List of Syrian governments
- Government ministries of Syria
- List of prime ministers of Syria
