= National Salvation Front in Syria =

National Salvation Front in Syria جبهة الخلاص الوطني في سوريا Front de salut national en Syrie
- Founder: Abdul Halim Khaddam
- Founded: 2005
- Headquarters: Belgium
- Ideology: Syrian nationalism Social liberalism Social democracy
- Political position: Centre-left

Website
- www.nsf-syria.org

The National Salvation Front in Syria (Arabic: جبهة الخلاص الوطني في سوريا Jabhat Al-Khalāṣ Al-Waṭanīy fi Sūrīya; French: Front de salut national en Syrie) was a Syrian opposition political party founded and based in Belgium. The party was formed in the wake of assassination of Rafic Hariri and Syria's withdrawal from Lebanon in 2005. During that time, it was Syria's largest exile opposition party.
