= Abdul Rahman Khleifawi =

Prime minister of Syria (1971–1972, 1976–1978)

- عبد الرحمن خليفاوي
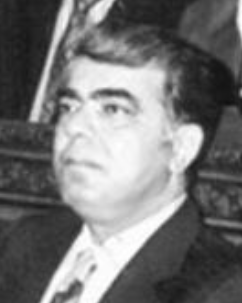
- Abdul Rahman Khleifawi (March 1971)

35th Prime Minister of Syria
- In office 7 August 1976 – 27 March 1978
- President: Hafez al-Assad
- Preceded by: Mahmoud al-Ayyubi
- Succeeded by: Muhammad Ali al-Halabi
- In office 3 April 1971 – 21 December 1972
- President: Hafez al-Assad
- Preceded by: Hafez al-Assad
- Succeeded by: Mahmoud al-Ayyubi

Member of the Regional Command of the Syrian Regional Branch
- In office 13 November 1970 – 7 January 1980

Minister of Interior
- In office 21 November 1970 – 4 March 1971
- President: Ahmad al-Khatib
- Prime Minister: Hafez al-Assad

Personal details
- Born: 1930 Damascus, Syria
- Died: 14 March 2009 (aged 78–79)
- Party: Ba'ath Party
- Other political affiliations: National Progressive Front

Military service
- Allegiance: First Syrian Republic (1946–1950); Second Syrian Republic (1950–1958); United Arab Republic (1958–1961); Second Syrian Republic (1961–1963); Ba'athist Syria (1963–1980)
- Branch/service: Syrian Army
- Rank: Major general

Abdul Rahman Khleifawi (Arabic: عبد الرحمن خليفاوي, romanized: ʿAbd ar-Raḥmān Khulayfāwiyy; 1930 – 14 March 2009) was a Syrian military officer and politician. He was Prime Minister of Syria from 1971 succeeding Hafez al-Assad who just promoted to the post of President of Syria to 1972 for 1 year and again from 1976 to 1978 for about 2 years, he served as prime minister for two separate terms together under President Hafez al-Assad.

== Early life ==
Khleifawi was born in 1930. He was of Algerian descent, originally from Draâ Ben Khedda.

== Career ==
Khleifawi was an army general. He served twice as prime minister of Syria. He was firstly in office from 3 April 1971 to 21 December 1972, being the first prime minister under the presidency of Hafez al-Assad. Khleifawi served as prime minister again from 7 August 1976 to 27 March 1978. He also served as a minister of interior between 1970 and 1971 under President Ahmad al-Khatib and Prime Minister Hafez al-Assad.

== Death ==
Khleifawi died on 14 March 2009.

Political offices
Preceded by Hafez al-Assad	Prime Minister of Syria; 1971–1972	Succeeded by Mahmoud al-Ayyubi
Preceded by Mahmoud al-Ayyubi	Prime Minister of Syria; 1976–1978	Succeeded by Muhammad Ali al-Halabi
