= Mahmoud al-Ayyubi =

Syrian politician (1932–2013)

- محمود الأيوبي
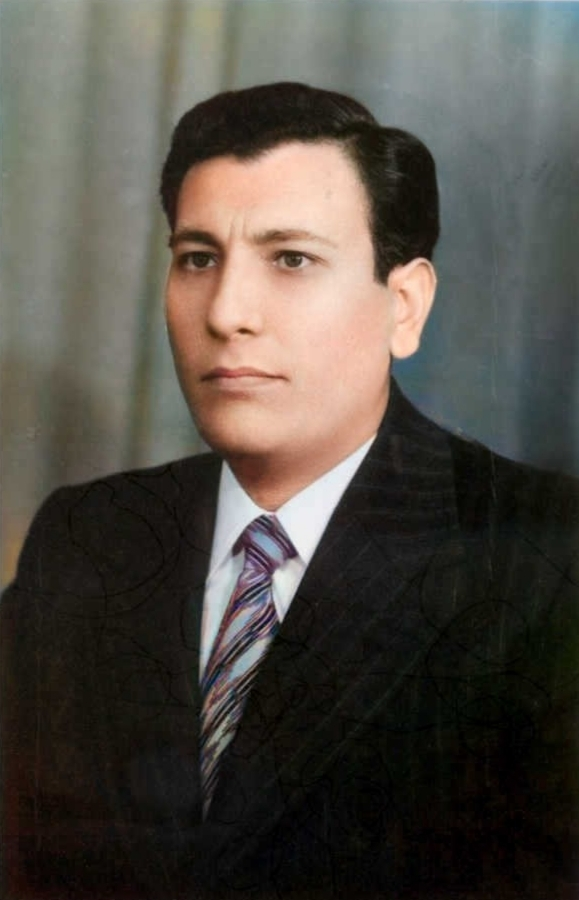

Vice President of Syria
- In office 22 February 1971 – 7 August 1976
- President: Ahmad al-Khatib (acting); Hafez al-Assad
- Preceded by: Shibli al-Aysami
- Succeeded by: Rifaat al-Assad; Abdul Halim Khaddam; Zuhair Masharqa

36th Prime Minister of Syria
- In office 21 December 1972 – 7 August 1976
- President: Hafez al-Assad
- Preceded by: Abdul Rahman Khleifawi
- Succeeded by: Abdul Rahman Khleifawi

Member of the Regional Command of the Syrian Regional Branch Ba'ath Party
- In office 7 January 1980 – 20 January 1985
- In office 13 November 1970 – 15 April 1975

Personal details
- Born: 1932
- Died: 11 October 2013 (aged 80–81) Damascus, Syrian Arab Republic
- Party: Ba'ath Party
- Other political affiliations: National Progressive Front

Mahmoud al-Ayyubi (Arabic: محمود الأيوبي, romanized: Maḥmūd al-Ayyūbī; 1932 – 11 October 2013) was a Syrian-Kurdish politician who served as the Vice President of Syria from 1971 to 1976. He was born to a prominent political family in Damascus, Syria and also served as the country's Prime Minister until 1976.

== Career ==
He served as Deputy Prime Minister and Minister of Education from 1970 to 1971 in the Hafez al-Assad Government.

Al-Ayyubi served as Prime Minister of Syria from 21 December 1972 to 7 August 1976, under the presidency of Hafez al-Assad.

He also served as Vice President of Syria from February 1971 to August 1976, Vice-President of the National Progressive Front, Minister of Education, member of the National Command of the Baath Party, and member of the National Command until his death in October 2013.

Political offices
Preceded by Abdul Rahman Khleifawi	Prime Minister of Syria; 1972–1976	Succeeded by Abdul Rahman Khleifawi
