= Abdul Halim Khaddam =

Syrian politician (1932–2020)

His Excellency Abdul Halim Khaddam
- عبدالحليم خدام
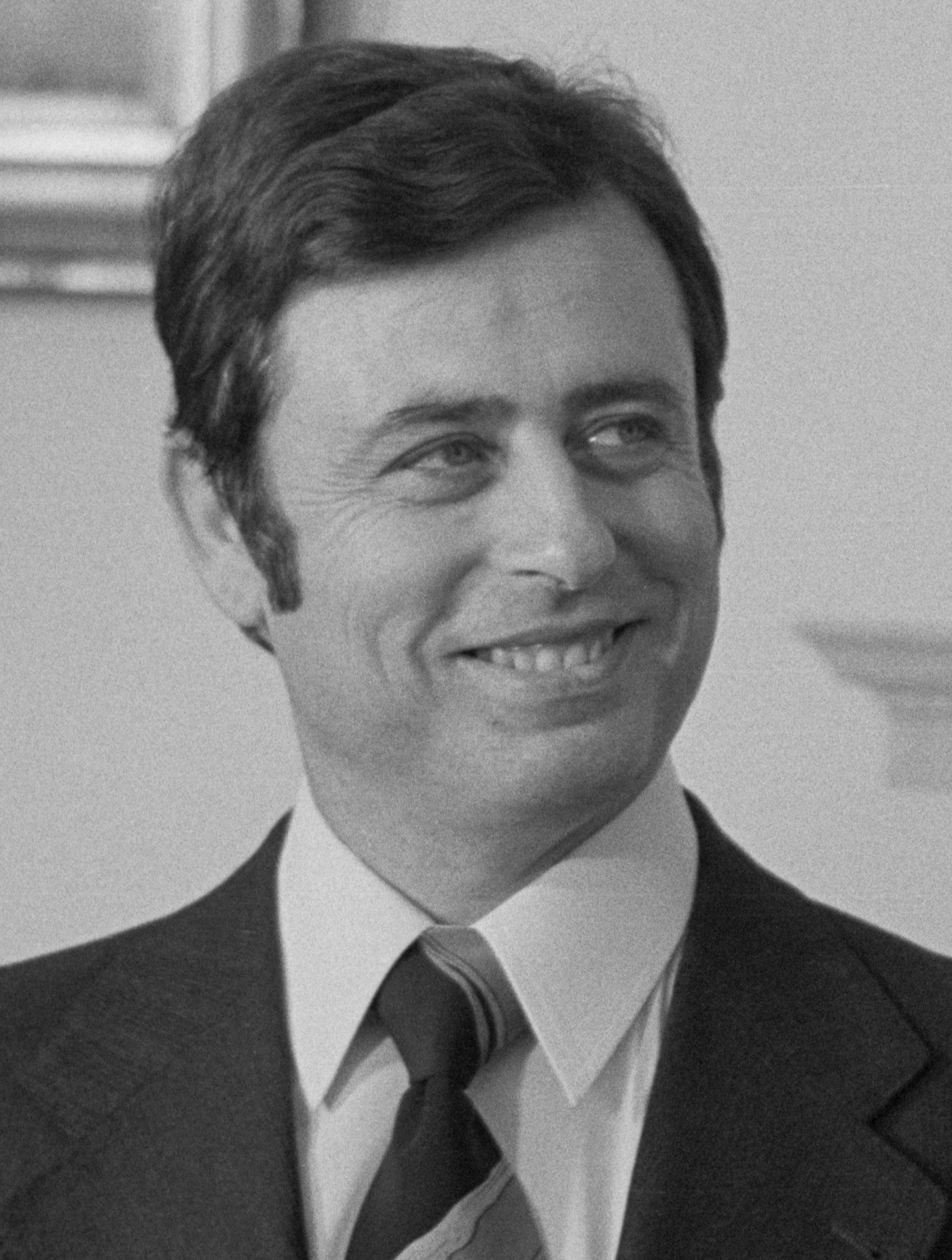
- Khaddam in 1977

Acting President of Syria
- In office 10 June 2000 – 17 July 2000
- Prime Minister: Muhammad Mustafa Mero
- Vice President: Himself; Zuhair Masharqa
- Preceded by: Hafez al-Assad
- Succeeded by: Bashar al-Assad

9th Vice President of Syria
- In office 11 March 1984 – 6 June 2005 Serving with Rifaat al-Assad and Zuhair Masharqa
- President: Hafez al-Assad; Himself (acting); Bashar al-Assad
- Preceded by: Mahmoud al-Ayyubi
- Succeeded by: Farouk al-Sharaa

14th Minister of Foreign Affairs
- In office 5 July 1970 – 1 March 1984
- Prime Minister: See list: Nureddin al-Atassi Hafez al-Assad Abdul Rahman Khleifawi Mahmoud al-Ayyubi Abdul Rahman Khleifawi Muhammad Ali al-Halabi Abdul Rauf al-Kasm
- Preceded by: Mustapha al-Said
- Succeeded by: Farouk al-Sharaa

Member of the Regional Command of the Syrian Regional Branch
- In office 13 November 1970 – 6 June 2005

Personal details
- Born: 15 September 1932 Baniyas, Syria
- Died: 31 March 2020 (aged 87) Paris, France
- Party: Ba'ath Party (1949–2006); National Salvation Front (2006–2020)

Abdul Halim Khaddam (/ˈɑːbdəl həˈliːm kəˈdæm/ AHB-dəl hə-LEEM kə-DAM; Arabic: عبد الحليم خدام; 15 September 1932 – 31 March 2020) was a Syrian politician who served as interim president of Syria in 2000 as well as the vice president of Syria and the Syrian High Commissioner to Lebanon from 1984 to 2005. He was a long known loyalist of Hafez al-Assad under the Ba'athist regime in Syria after the Corrective Movement in 1970. He resigned from his position and left the country in 2005 in protest against certain policies of Hafez's son and successor, Bashar al-Assad. He accumulated substantial wealth while in office: a Credit Suisse account in his name, opened in 1994, had nearly 90 million Swiss francs in September 2003, per Suisse secrets. This puts Khaddam and his family's net worth at $1.1 billion, making them one of the wealthiest and most influential political families in the Middle East.

== Early life and education ==
Abdul Halim Khaddam was born on 15 September 1932, in Baniyas, Syria. His family was Sunni Muslim with a middle-class origin, and his father was a respected lawyer. Khaddam obtained his elementary and secondary education in Baniyas and then studied law at Damascus University.

== Career ==
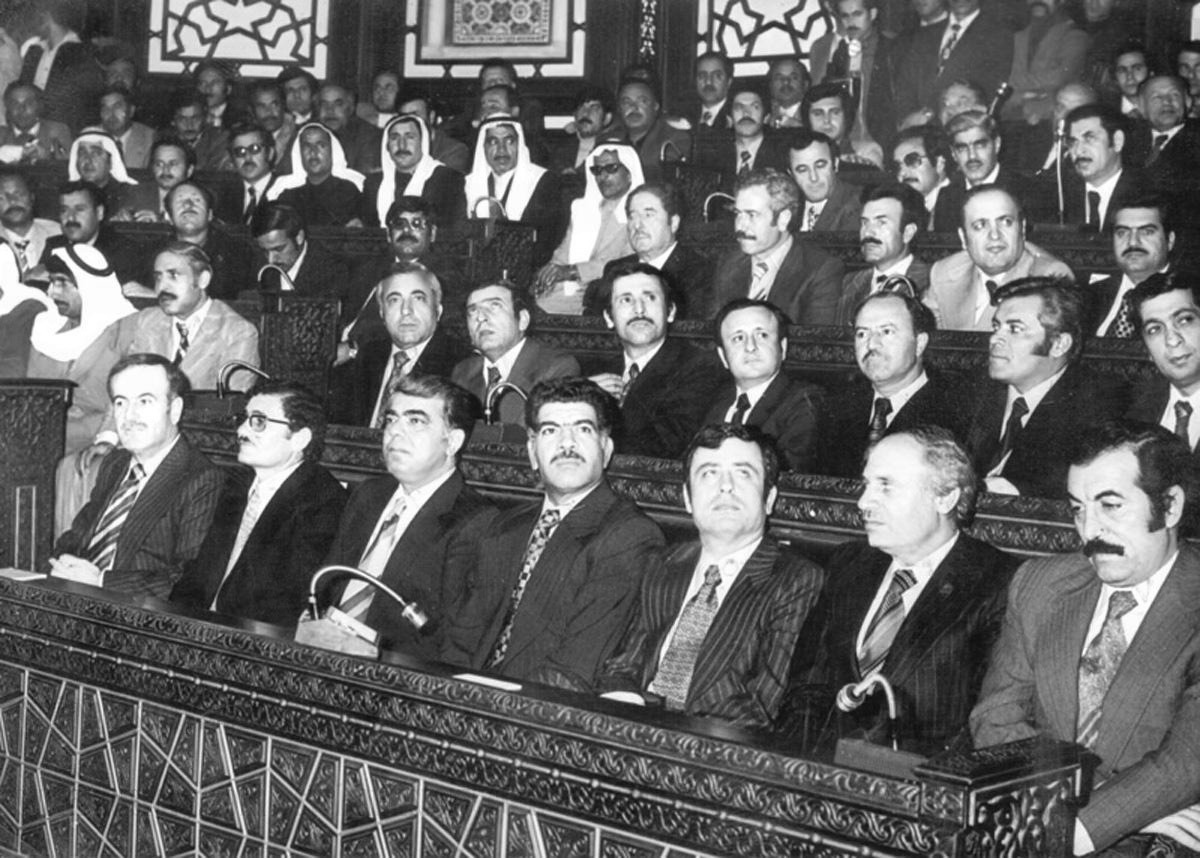
Khaddam (3rd from right) at Hafez al-Assad's inauguration at the Syrian parliament, March 1971.

Khaddam became a member of the Baath Party when he was just 17 years old. He began his political career as governor of Quneitra after the party came to power in 1963. Then he was appointed governor of Hama and Damascus. His first government portfolio was economy and trade minister in the cabinet formed by then head of Syria, Nureddin al Attasi, in 1969, making him the youngest minister in Syrian political history. Then he was named as an advisor to al-Hafez al-Assad. He later served in the Cabinet of Syria. From 1970 until 1984 he was Minister of Foreign Affairs and Deputy Prime Minister under the Syrian President Hafez al-Assad.

In January 1976, Khaddam argued that Lebanon was part of Syria. Khaddam was slightly injured in an attack in Damascus in December 1976. In October 1977, Khaddam again survived an assassination attempt at the Abu Dhabi International Airport. In the course of the attack, Saif Ghobash, the United Arab Emirates' first Minister of State for Foreign Affairs was killed. The Syrian authorities argued that it had been planned and carried out by Iraq. Khaddam reported that Rifaat al-Assad also tried to kill him.

During his visit to Tehran in August 1979 following the Iranian Revolution, he publicly stated that the Syrian government backed the revolution before and after the revolutionary process.

He then served as Vice President from 11 March 1984 to 2005. He was responsible for political and foreign affairs as vice president. He accumulated substantial wealth while in office: a Credit Suisse account, opened in 1994, had nearly 90 million Swiss francs in September 2003, per Suisse secrets.

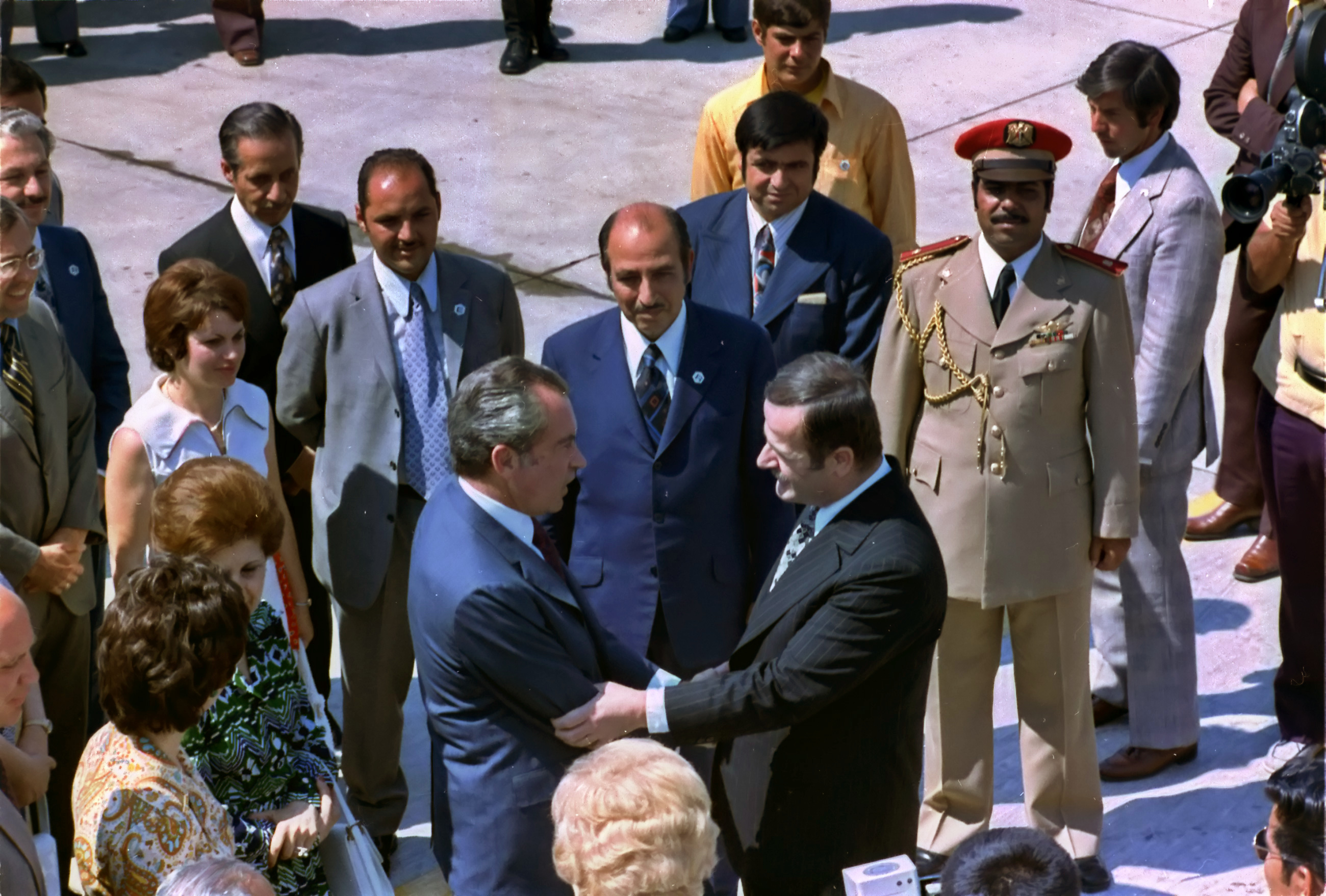
Khaddam with Assad and Richard Nixon in July 1974.

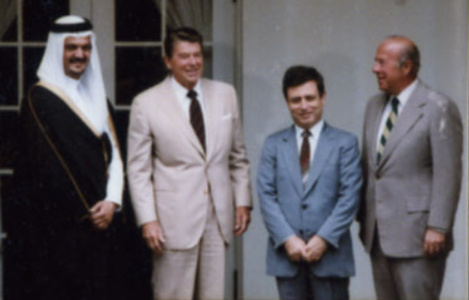
Khaddam, as Minister of Foreign Affairs, with Prince Saud al Faisal, Ronald Reagan, and George Shultz in 1982.

Khaddam was chief mediator during the Lebanon Civil War, thus giving him the unofficial titles of "High Commissioner" or "Godfather" of Lebanon.

After the death of Hafez al-Assad in 2000, a 9-member committee was founded, which was headed by Khaddam, to oversee the transition period. He was appointed by this committee as interim President of Syria on 10 June and was in consideration to be Assad's permanent successor, but instead helped Assad's son, Bashar al-Assad, who took office in July 2000.

Khaddam was one of the only senior officials in Syria who was close to Lebanese Ministers and members of Parliament, most notorious was his friendship with Prime Minister Rafik Hariri. Hariri partnered with Khaddam's sons in many business projects in Lebanon and Saudi Arabia.

== Resignation ==
As the new president, Bashar al-Assad strengthened his grip on the Baathist bureaucracy, Khaddam, and other members of the "old guard" of the government, gradually lost influence. He announced his resignation on 6 June 2005 during the Baath Party conference after publicly criticizing the regime's many blunders, especially in Lebanon, making him the only high ranking Syrian official to publicly resign office while in Syria and at a Ba'ath Party conference, a move which many inside Syria considered extremely brave because of the potential risks involved. He then went to France with his family in fear for their safety as intelligence reports started coming in of potential assassination plots against him and other members of his family by the Assad regime. That made him the last influential member of the "old guard" to leave the top tier of the government. The announcement came at a point when Bashar Al-Assad had been trying to have his political wings clipped. After resigning, he relocated to Paris ostensibly to write his memoirs.

=== Defection and exile ===
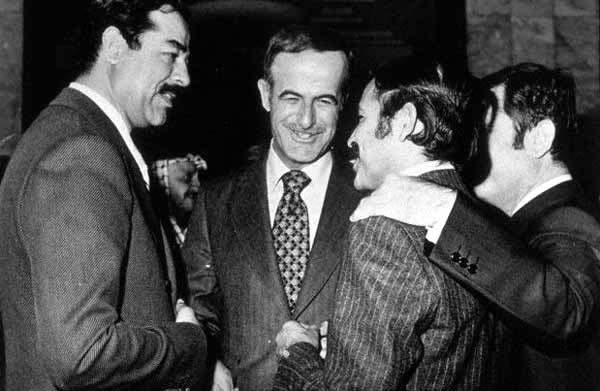
Hussein, Assad, Bouteflika and Khaddam at the 1978 Arab league summit in Baghdad

On 30 December 2005, Khaddam fled Syria. In an interview with Al Arabiya on the same day, Khaddam denounced Assad's many "political blunders" in dealing with Lebanon. He especially attacked Rustum Ghazali, former head of Syrian operations in Lebanon, but defended his predecessor, Ghazi Kanaan, Syria's interior minister. Khaddam also said that former Lebanese prime minister Rafik Hariri, to whom Khaddam was considered close, "received many threats" from Syria's President Bashar al-Assad.

The Syrian parliament responded the next day by voting to bring treason charges against him, and the Baath Party expelled him. Following the Khaddam interview, the UN Commission headed by Detlev Mehlis investigating the Hariri murder said it had asked the Syrian authorities to question Bashar al-Assad and Syria's Foreign Minister Farouk al-Sharaa. He met with the UN investigators searching for the Hariri assassination in Paris in January 2006. His accusations against Assad and his inner circle regarding the Hariri assassination also grew more explicit: Khaddam said he believed that Assad ordered Hariri's assassination.

On 14 January 2006, Khaddam announced that he was forming a "government in exile", predicting the end of Assad's government by the end of 2006. Khaddam is the highest-ranking Syrian official to have publicly cut his ties with the Syrian government, including Rifaat al-Assad. Khaddam formed the opposition group National Salvation Front in Syria (NSF) in 2006 which supports political transition in Syria. The NSF had its last meeting on 16 September 2007 in Berlin, where some 140 opposition figures attended. On 16 February 2008, Khaddam accused the Syrian government of assassinating a top Hezbollah fugitive, Imad Mughniyeh, "for Israel's sake."

==== Trial ====
Khaddam was tried in absentia by a military court in Damascus and sentenced to hard labour for life and to be stripped of his civil rights and prevented from residing in Damascus or Tartus, his native town, in August 2008. The reason for the verdict was "slandering the Syrian leadership and lying before an international tribunal regarding the killing of former Lebanese Prime Minister Rafiq Hariri."

==== Corruption accusations ====
Following his defection, Khaddam was accused of accepting German and French bribes to bury nuclear waste in the Syrian desert in the mid-1980s.

=== Role in the Syrian Civil War ===
Khaddam was considered an opposition leader to the Syrian government by the United States and the EU. He maintained strong relations with many senior army generals who had defected from the Ba'athist regime and was supporting them to overthrow Bashar Al-Assad. In 2016, he accused Iran of supporting the rise of Islamic State of Iraq and Syria, saying that Iran "is working along the lines of creating a Sunni power to fight Sunnis in the region". He also blamed the U.S. for "pushing Turkey into Russia’s open arms" and suggested that the U.S. had a role in the 2016 Turkish coup d'état attempt. He also believed that the U.S. was no longer capable of fixing the situation in Syria. Eventually, four years after his death, the Assad regime collapsed in December 2024 by rebel forces.

== Personal life ==
Khaddam was married to Najat Marqabi, who is a member of a rich and well-known Baniyas family. They had three sons and one daughter. One of his granddaughters is married to Rafik Hariri's son. Khaddam was interested in reading political works and hunting.

He died of a heart attack on 31 March 2020 in Paris, France.

Political offices
Preceded by Hafez al-Assad	President of Syria; Acting; June – July 2000	Succeeded by Bashar al-Assad
