= Muhammad Talab Hilal =

Syrian military officer and politician

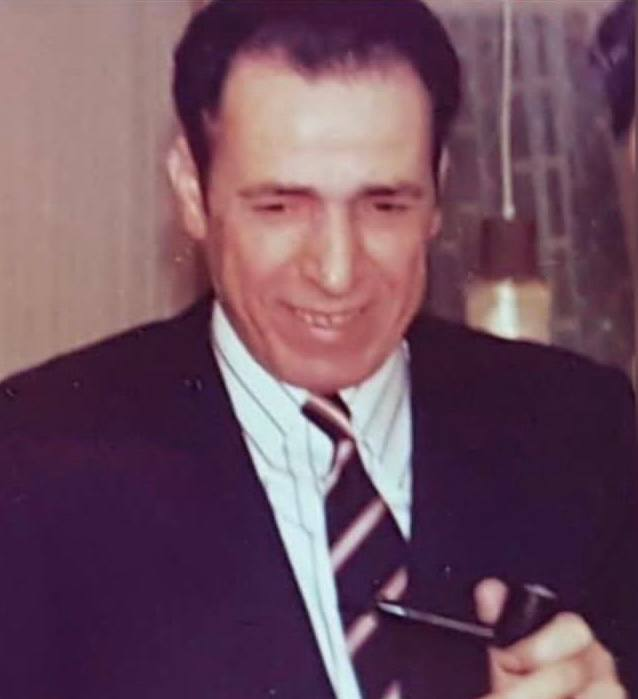
- Hilal in 1970s
- Born: Syria
- Military career
- Rank: Various positions including Deputy Prime Minister of Syria
- Unit: Syrian Arab Armed Forces
- Known for: Minister of Supply in the Ba'athist government, policies towards Kurds, Chief of Police in al-Hasakah Governorate, Arab Belt strategy

Muhammad Talab Hilal (Arabic: محمد طالب هلال) was a Syrian military officer and politician. He was the minister of supply in the Ba'athist government of Yusuf Zuayyin and after Zuayyin's resignation in 1968, also under Nureddin al-Atassi. In 1971 Hilal took part in a delegation consisting of Hafez Al Assad and other Syrian Ministers visiting Moscow, Soviet Union. Under Assad, he served as a deputy prime minister, minister of agrarian reform and acting minister of the interior at different times. Before he was the governor of Hama and the chief of police in the Governorate of al-Hasakah. While he was the chief of police Hasakah, Hilal wrote a book on Syria's Jazira region which was influential for the Syrian government's "Arab Belt" in the Kurdish populated regions in Syria. He denied an eventual existence of a Kurdish language and ethnicity and supported the shutting down of Kurdish schools also when they taught in the Arabic language. He deemed the existence of the Kurds in the vicinity of the Arab nation a similar threat as the Jews in Israel.

Hilal completed his study on the National, Political, and Social Study of the Province of Jazira (Note: Other translations are: A Study about the National, Social, and Political Aspects of Al-Jazeera Province, Study of the al-Jezira Province from its Political, National and Social Perspectives, and National, social and political study of the province of Djazireh) in November 1963. In view of the Kurdish uprising in Iraq he warned of a similar situation in Syria and suggested the creation of an Arab populated area in the border region between Syria, Turkey and Iraq.

Hilal produced a twelvefold strategy to achieve the Arabization of the al-Jazira Province. The steps were:

- (1) eviction and resettlement of Kurds
- (2) deprivation of all education for Kurds
- (3) removal of Kurds from employment
- (4) the reevaluation of the Syrian citizenships of Kurds also holding a Turkish citizenship
- (5) encouragement of intra-Kurdish factionalism in order to divide and rule
- (6) Arab settlements in former Kurdish lands
- (7) colonization – "pure and nationalist Arabs" to be settled in Syrian Kurdistan so Kurds might be "watched until their dispersion"
- (8) military involvement by divisions stationed in the zone of the cordon would guaranty that the dispersion of the Kurds and the settlement of Arabs would take place according to plans drawn up by the government
- (9) collective farms are to be established by Arab settlers equipped with "armament and training"
- (10) prohibition of "anybody ignorant of the Arabic language exercising the right to vote or stand for office"
- (11) Kurdish religious dignitaries were to be expelled to the south and replaced with Arabs
- (12) "a vast anti-Kurdish campaign amongst the Arabs" to be undertaken by the state
