= Ahmad al-Khatib =

Syrian politician (1933–1982)

- أحمد الخطيب
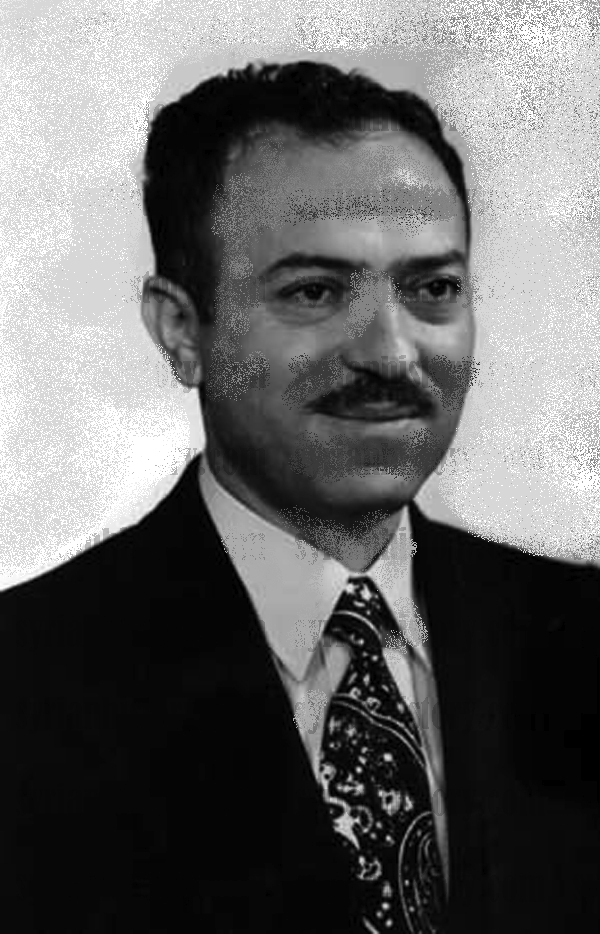
- Khatib in 1970

Acting President of Syria
- In office 18 November 1970 – 12 March 1971
- Prime Minister: Vacant; Hafez al-Assad
- Vice President: Vacant; Mahmoud al-Ayyubi
- Preceded by: Nureddin al-Atassi
- Succeeded by: Hafez al-Assad

Speaker of the People's Assembly of Syria
- In office 22 February 1971 – 26 December 1971
- Preceded by: Mansur al-Atrash (was parliament chairman in 1966)
- Succeeded by: Fahmi al-Yusufi

Member of the Regional Command of the Syrian Regional Branch
- In office 13 November 1970 – 15 April 1975

Personal details
- Born: 1933 Daraa, First Syrian Republic
- Died: 1982 (aged 48–49) Damascus, Syria
- Party: Ba'ath Party
- Relatives: Najwa al-Khatib

Ahmad al-Hasan al-Khatib (Arabic: أحمد الحسن الخطيب; 1933–1982) was a Syrian politician who served as the sole ceremonial head of state of Syria, appointed by Hafez al-Assad to replace the ousted president Nureddin al-Atassi.

al-Khatib was a civilian member of the ruling Syrian Ba'ath Party and served as the country's acting president for only four months. When Assad subsequently became president in 1971, he then became the speaker of the People's Assembly of Syria.

== Personal life and death ==
He died in Damascus, Syria in 1982. He had many siblings, one of them was Najwa al-Khatib, the wife of Abdulmajid Mansour, a prominent doctor in the Syrian Army who died in 2007.
