= List of members of the People's Assembly (Syria), 2016–2020 =

This is a list of members elected to the 2nd People's Assembly, following the 2016 parliamentary election.

== Composition ==
Party		Members
NPF	Ba'ath Party	167 / 250 (67%)
NPF	Syrian Social Nationalist Party	7 / 250 (3%)
NPF	Arab Socialist Union Party	2 / 250 (0.8%)
NPF	Communist (Unified)	2 / 250 (0.8%)
NPF	Communist (Bakdash)	2 / 250 (0.8%)
NPF	Socialist Unionist Party	2 / 250 (0.8%)
NPF	National Covenant Party	1 / 250 (0.4%)
Independent		67 / 250 (27%)

== Members ==
No.	Electoral district	Sector	Name	Party
1	Damascus	A	Atif al-Zaybaq	Ba'ath Party
2	Damascus	A	Abbas Sandouq	Ba'ath Party
3	Damascus	A	Ahd al-Kanj	Ba'ath Party
4	Damascus	A	Muhammad Izzat Arabi Katbi	Ba'ath Party
5	Damascus	A	Mona Sukkar	Ba'ath Party
6	Damascus	A	Maha Shbero	Ba'ath Party
7	Damascus	A	Samer al-Ayyubi	Independent
8	Damascus	A	Omar Oussi	Independent
9	Damascus	A	Farah Hamsho	Independent
10	Damascus	A	Muhammad Akram al-Ajlani	Independent
11	Damascus	B	Sameer Hajjar	SSNP
12	Damascus	B	Ammar Bakdash	Communist (Bakdash)
13	Damascus	B	Ahmad Kazbari	Ba'ath Party
14	Damascus	B	Hassib Tahhan	Ba'ath Party
15	Damascus	B	Aref al-Tawil	Ba'ath Party
16	Damascus	B	Mary al-Bitar	Ba'ath Party
17	Damascus	B	Muhammad Bashir al-Shurbaji	Ba'ath Party
18	Damascus	B	Muhammad Jihad al-Laham	Ba'ath Party
19	Damascus	B	Muhammad Khair al-Akkam	Ba'ath Party
20	Damascus	B	Nabil Toumeh	Ba'ath Party
21	Damascus	B	Anas Zuray	Independent
22	Damascus	B	Khalil Taameh	Independent
23	Damascus	B	Samer al-Dibs	Independent
24	Damascus	B	Tarif Qutrash	Independent
25	Damascus	B	Muhammad Hamsho	Independent
26	Damascus	B	Muhammad Maher al-Bustani	Independent
27	Damascus	B	Muhammad Humam Masouti	Independent
28	Damascus	B	Noura Arisian	Independent
29	Damascus	B	Hadi Sharaf	Independent
30	Rif Dimashq	A	Elias Murad	Ba'ath Party
31	Rif Dimashq	A	Jamal al-Qadri	Ba'ath Party
32	Rif Dimashq	A	Jamil al-Jabbaji	Ba'ath Party
33	Rif Dimashq	A	Georgina Rizk	Ba'ath Party
34	Rif Dimashq	A	Shehadeh Abu Hamed	Ba'ath Party
35	Rif Dimashq	A	Ali al-Sheikh	Ba'ath Party
36	Rif Dimashq	A	Imad Namour	Ba'ath Party
37	Rif Dimashq	A	Majed Halima	Ba'ath Party
38	Rif Dimashq	A	Mowaffaq Jomaa	Ba'ath Party
39	Rif Dimashq	A	Muhammad Khair al-Nader	Independent
40	Rif Dimashq	B	Ahmad Zaytoun	Ba'ath Party
41	Rif Dimashq	B	Osama Mustafa	Ba'ath Party
42	Rif Dimashq	B	Hamzi Shahin	Ba'ath Party
43	Rif Dimashq	B	Rimon Hilal	Ba'ath Party
44	Rif Dimashq	B	Ziad Sukkari	Ba'ath Party
45	Rif Dimashq	B	Muhammad Khair Sarioul	Ba'ath Party
46	Rif Dimashq	B	Muhammad Asaad	Independent
47	Rif Dimashq	B	Muhammad Qaband	Independent
48	Rif Dimashq	B	Muhannad Zaid	Independent
49	Aleppo	A	Amira Stefano	Ba'ath Party
50	Aleppo	A	Hussein Farhou	Ba'ath Party
51	Aleppo	A	Muhammad Rabee Qalaaji	Ba'ath Party
52	Aleppo	A	Muhannad al-Hajj Ali	Ba'ath Party
53	Aleppo	A	Noha Janat	Ba'ath Party
54	Aleppo	A	Hussam Qaterji	Independent
55	Aleppo	A	Hussam Qaterji	Independent
56	Aleppo	B	Salloum al-Salloum	Independent
57	Aleppo	B	Abd al-Majid al-Kawakibi	Ba'ath Party
58	Aleppo	B	Muhammad Jalal Darwish	Ba'ath Party
59	Aleppo	B	Muhammad Maher al-Muwaqqi	Ba'ath Party
60	Aleppo	B	Mustafa Saad Alabi	Ba'ath Party
61	Aleppo	B	Maan Qanbour	Ba'ath Party
62	Aleppo	B	Muhammad Yahya Kaadan	National Covenant
63	Aleppo	B	Al Hassan Berri	Independent
64	Aleppo	B	Butros Murjana	Independent
65	Aleppo	B	Jirayr Ranisian	Independent
66	Aleppo	B	Zainab Khawla	Independent
67	Aleppo	B	Fares al-Shihabi	Independent
68	Aleppo	B	Najdat Anzour	Independent
69	Districts of Aleppo Governorate	A	Muhammad al-Hazwari	Ba'ath Party
70	Districts of Aleppo Governorate	A	Joumana Abu Shaar	Ba'ath Party
71	Districts of Aleppo Governorate	A	Hussein Jassim Hamad	Ba'ath Party
72	Districts of Aleppo Governorate	A	Hussein Hassoun	Ba'ath Party
73	Districts of Aleppo Governorate	A	Suhail Abdallah	Ba'ath Party
74	Districts of Aleppo Governorate	A	Ali al-Zeidan	Ba'ath Party
75	Districts of Aleppo Governorate	A	Ali al-Ali al-Abdo al-Satouf	Ba'ath Party
76	Districts of Aleppo Governorate	A	Omar al-Aroub	Ba'ath Party
77	Districts of Aleppo Governorate	A	Eid al-Khalawi	Ba'ath Party
78	Districts of Aleppo Governorate	A	Fadel Kaadeh	Ba'ath Party
79	Districts of Aleppo Governorate	A	Qassem Hassan	Ba'ath Party
80	Districts of Aleppo Governorate	A	Muhammad Fawaz	Ba'ath Party
81	Districts of Aleppo Governorate	A	Hussein al-Jumaa Lahaj Qasem	Independent
82	Districts of Aleppo Governorate	A	Obeid al-Obeid al-Issa	Independent
83	Districts of Aleppo Governorate	A	Omar al-Hassan	Independent
84	Districts of Aleppo Governorate	A	Fares Jneidan	Independent
85	Districts of Aleppo Governorate	A	Fahmi al-Hassan	Independent
86	Districts of Aleppo Governorate	B	Ahmad Marai	SSNP
87	Districts of Aleppo Governorate	B	Alan Bakr	Ba'ath Party
88	Districts of Aleppo Governorate	B	Abd al-Razzaq Barakat	Ba'ath Party
89	Districts of Aleppo Governorate	B	Abdallah Haji Wardi	Ba'ath Party
90	Districts of Aleppo Governorate	B	Ali Khalil Bashar	Ba'ath Party
91	Districts of Aleppo Governorate	B	Ali Ali al-Mustafa	Ba'ath Party
92	Districts of Aleppo Governorate	B	Omar Mahmoud al-Hamdo	Ba'ath Party
93	Districts of Aleppo Governorate	B	Fahd Amin	Ba'ath Party
94	Districts of Aleppo Governorate	B	Muhammad al-Batran	Ba'ath Party
95	Districts of Aleppo Governorate	B	Manal al-Sheikh Amin	Ba'ath Party
96	Districts of Aleppo Governorate	B	Nasser Karim	Ba'ath Party
97	Districts of Aleppo Governorate	B	Ahmad al-Ali al-Hamra	Independent
98	Districts of Aleppo Governorate	B	Khaldoun Oweis Oweis	Independent
99	Districts of Aleppo Governorate	B	Mujib al-Rahman al-Dandan	Independent
100	Districts of Aleppo Governorate	B	Hassan Shahid	Independent
101	Homs	A	Tawfiq Iskandar	Ba'ath Party
102	Homs	A	Rana Suleiman	Ba'ath Party
103	Homs	A	Saji Taama	Ba'ath Party
104	Homs	A	Sami Amin	Ba'ath Party
105	Homs	A	Sanaa Abu Zaid	Ba'ath Party
106	Homs	A	Fadia Deeb	Ba'ath Party
107	Homs	A	Muhammad Raad	Ba'ath Party
108	Homs	A	Muhammad Raad	Ba'ath Party
109	Homs	A	Mishaal al-Hamoud	Ba'ath Party
110	Homs	A	Mayouf al-Dhiab	Ba'ath Party
111	Homs	A	Hazar al-Daqas	Ba'ath Party
112	Homs	B	Bashar al-Yaziji	SSNP
113	Homs	B	Jirjis al-Shannour	Communist (Bakdash)
114	Homs	B	Ahmad al-Ali	Ba'ath Party
115	Homs	B	Jamal Rabaa	Ba'ath Party
116	Homs	B	Saleh Maarouf	Ba'ath Party
117	Homs	B	Muhammad al-Sebai	Ba'ath Party
118	Homs	B	Muhammad Nizar Sharfo	Ba'ath Party
119	Homs	B	Mehran Madi	Ba'ath Party
120	Homs	B	Badee al-Droubi	Independent
121	Homs	B	Abd al-Aziz al-Mulhim	Independent
122	Homs	B	Firas al-Salloum	Independent
123	Homs	B	Wael Mulhem	Independent
124	Hama	A	Abd al-Rahman Azkahi	ASU
125	Hama	A	Hamed Hassan	Ba'ath Party
126	Hama	A	Hussein Abbas	Ba'ath Party
127	Hama	A	Salam Sanqar	Ba'ath Party
128	Hama	A	Abd al-Karim al-Sabsabi	Ba'ath Party
129	Hama	A	Ghada Ibrahim	Ba'ath Party
130	Hama	A	Fadel Warda	Ba'ath Party
131	Hama	A	Maher Qawarma	Ba'ath Party
132	Hama	A	Muhammad Alloush Jughaili	Ba'ath Party
133	Hama	A	Mahmoud al-Abd al-Salam	Ba'ath Party
134	Hama	A	Badee al-Hussein	Independent
135	Hama	A	Jamal Youssef	Independent
136	Hama	A	Abd al-Karim al-Ismail	Independent
137	Hama	B	Mazen Azzouz	SSNP
138	Hama	B	Ayman Melandi	Ba'ath Party
139	Hama	B	Khader al-Saleh	Ba'ath Party
140	Hama	B	Abd al-Karim al-Bakir	Ba'ath Party
141	Hama	B	Maher Labad	Ba'ath Party
142	Hama	B	Muhammad al-Aji	Ba'ath Party
143	Hama	B	Mahmoud Jokhdar	Ba'ath Party
144	Hama	B	Dawlat al-Murshid	Independent
145	Hama	B	Waddah Murad	Independent
146	Latakia	A	Iskandar Haddad	Ba'ath Party
147	Latakia	A	Bassem Sudan	Ba'ath Party
148	Latakia	A	Zuhair Ramadan	Ba'ath Party
149	Latakia	A	Sameer al-Khatib	Ba'ath Party
150	Latakia	A	Ammar al-Assad	Ba'ath Party
151	Latakia	A	Muhammad Ajil	Ba'ath Party
152	Latakia	A	Mustafa Kheirbek	Ba'ath Party
153	Latakia	A	Fawaz Nassour	Independent
154	Latakia	A	Nabil Saleh	Independent
155	Latakia	B	Sameer Nassir	SSNP
156	Latakia	B	Ayham Jreikos	Ba'ath Party
157	Latakia	B	Samer Shiha	Ba'ath Party
158	Latakia	B	Fayhaa Tarifli	Ba'ath Party
159	Latakia	B	Mazen Omran	Ba'ath Party
160	Latakia	B	Nizar al-Skif	Ba'ath Party
161	Latakia	B	Adnan al-Zarf	Independent
162	Latakia	B	Nour Shaghri	Independent
163	Idlib	A	Ahmad al-Hilal	Ba'ath Party
164	Idlib	A	Ahmad Qabbani	Ba'ath Party
165	Idlib	A	Khaled al-Daher	Ba'ath Party
166	Idlib	A	Sameer al-Ismail	Ba'ath Party
167	Idlib	A	Shireen al-Youssef	Ba'ath Party
168	Idlib	A	Abd al-Wahid Razzouq	Ba'ath Party
169	Idlib	A	Ghiyath al-Qatini	Ba'ath Party
170	Idlib	A	Faisal al-Mahmoud	Ba'ath Party
171	Idlib	A	Muhammad Zaher al-Yousefi	Ba'ath Party
172	Idlib	A	Muhammad Tarek Daabol	Ba'ath Party
173	Idlib	A	Zakwan Assi	Socialist Unionist
174	Idlib	A	Nidal Hamidi	Independent
175	Idlib	B	Muhammad Talal Houri	SSNP
176	Idlib	B	Jamal Masto	Ba'ath Party
177	Idlib	B	Safwan Qarbi	Ba'ath Party
178	Idlib	B	Fatima Khamis	Ba'ath Party
179	Idlib	B	Yahya Awad	Ba'ath Party
180	Idlib	B	Muhammad Hussein al-Hussein	Independent
181	Tartus	A	Basil Issa	Ba'ath Party
182	Tartus	A	Khaled Khaddouj	Ba'ath Party
183	Tartus	A	Dima Suleiman	Ba'ath Party
184	Tartus	A	Tony Hanna	Ba'ath Party
185	Tartus	A	Noura Hassan	Ba'ath Party
186	Tartus	A	Ashwaq Abbas	Independent
187	Tartus	B	Enas al-Malouhi	SSNP
188	Tartus	B	Ayman Bilal	Ba'ath Party
189	Tartus	B	Ayman Bilal	Ba'ath Party
190	Tartus	B	Saer Ibrahim	Ba'ath Party
191	Tartus	B	Nasser Suleiman	Ba'ath Party
192	Tartus	B	Khadr Hussein	Independent
193	Tartus	B	Rami Saleh	Ba'ath Party
194	Raqqa	A	Khaled al-Darwish	Ba'ath Party
195	Raqqa	A	Maha al-Ajeili	Ba'ath Party
196	Raqqa	A	Mousa al-Ibrahim	Ba'ath Party
197	Raqqa	A	Khalil al-Kasha	Independent
198	Raqqa	B	Ismail al-Hajjo	Communist (Unified)
199	Raqqa	B	Ahmad al-Mahmoud al-Darwish	Ba'ath Party
200	Raqqa	B	Abd al-Basit al-Alawi	Ba'ath Party
201	Raqqa	B	Faisal Haji Omar	Independent
202	Deir ez-Zor	A	Burhan al-Abd al-Wahhab	Ba'ath Party
203	Deir ez-Zor	A	Abd al-Salam al-Dahmoush	Ba'ath Party
204	Deir ez-Zor	A	Muhammad al-Raja	Ba'ath Party
205	Deir ez-Zor	A	Muhammad Jadallah	Ba'ath Party
206	Deir ez-Zor	A	Maan al-Abboud	Ba'ath Party
207	Deir ez-Zor	A	Hadiya Abbas	Ba'ath Party
208	Deir ez-Zor	A	Ibrahim al-Daer	Independent
209	Deir ez-Zor	A	Najm al-Salman	Independent
210	Deir ez-Zor	B	Muhammad al-Saad al-Mashali	ASU
211	Deir ez-Zor	B	Sattam al-Dandal	Ba'ath Party
212	Deir ez-Zor	B	Taha al-Khalifah	Ba'ath Party
213	Deir ez-Zor	B	Mahmoud Hussein al-Hassan	Ba'ath Party
214	Deir ez-Zor	B	Hamadi al-Hassani	Ba'ath Party
215	Deir ez-Zor	B	Ibtisam al-Taha al-Husseini	Independent
216	Al-Hasakah	A	Maloul al-Hussein	Communist (Unified)
217	Al-Hasakah	A	Hassan Salloumi	Ba'ath Party
218	Al-Hasakah	A	Hammad al-Saud	Ba'ath Party
219	Al-Hasakah	A	Abboud al-Shawakh	Ba'ath Party
220	Al-Hasakah	A	Adnan Suleiman	Ba'ath Party
221	Al-Hasakah	A	Nour Darra	Ba'ath Party
222	Al-Hasakah	A	Reem al-Saai	Independent
223	Al-Hasakah	A	Alaa al-Din al-Hamad	Independent
224	Al-Hasakah	B	Hammouda Sabbagh	Ba'ath Party
225	Al-Hasakah	B	Khaled al-Atiyah	Ba'ath Party
226	Al-Hasakah	B	Riyadh Tawaz	Ba'ath Party
227	Al-Hasakah	B	Abd al-Muhaymid	Ba'ath Party
228	Al-Hasakah	B	Hassan al-Musallat	Independent
229	Al-Hasakah	B	Muhammad Abd al-Rahman	Independent
230	Daraa	A	Jamal al-Zoubi	Ba'ath Party
231	Daraa	A	Fawaz al-Jawabrah	Ba'ath Party
232	Daraa	A	Kamal al-Ayyash	Ba'ath Party
233	Daraa	A	Nayef al-Hariri	Ba'ath Party
234	Daraa	A	Farouq al-Hamadi	Independent
235	Daraa	B	Faiza al-Adhbah	Ba'ath Party
236	Daraa	B	Fawaz al-Sharaa	Ba'ath Party
237	Daraa	B	Faisal al-Khoury	Ba'ath Party
238	Daraa	B	Riyadh Shatiwi	Independent
239	Daraa	B	Khaled al-Abboud	Socialist Unionist
240	Suwayda	A	Aida Arij	Ba'ath Party
241	Suwayda	A	Issam Naim	Ba'ath Party
242	Suwayda	A	Mouaad Nasser	Ba'ath Party
243	Suwayda	A	Nashaat al-Atrash	Independent
244	Suwayda	B	Nidal al-Shariti	Ba'ath Party
245	Suwayda	B	Naim Nassr	Independent
246	Quneitra	A	Ayman Harrouq	Ba'ath Party
247	Quneitra	A	Rifaat Hussein	Ba'ath Party
248	Quneitra	A	Walid al-Darwish	Independent
249	Quneitra	B	Khaled Khazal	Ba'ath Party
250	Quneitra	B	Jansit Ghazan	Independent

== By-elections ==
Electoral district	Date	Previous incumbent	Party	Winner	Party	Cause
Districts of Aleppo Governorate	15 January 2017	Muhammad al-Hazwari	Ba'ath Party	Ahmad Saleh Ibrahim	Ba'ath Party	Resigned after being appointed governor of Hama.
Districts of Aleppo Governorate	18 February 2017	Fahmi al-Hassan	Independent	Qadri al-Hassan	Independent	Death.
Deir ez-Zor	30 December 2017	Hamadi al-Hassani	Ba'ath Party	Aytan al-Aytan	Ba'ath Party	Death.
Tartus	24 February 2018	Saer Ibrahim	Ba'ath Party	Qutaiba Badr	Ba'ath Party	Death.
Aleppo	14 April 2018	Abd al-Majid al-Kawakibi	Ba'ath Party	Muhammad Ammar Karman	Ba'ath Party	Resigned after being appointed governor of Deir ez-Zor.
Damascus	23 June 2018	Mohammad Jihad al-Laham	Ba'ath Party	Maan Ghanim	Ba'ath Party	Resigned after being appointed head of the Supreme Constitutional Court.
Raqqa	23 June 2018	Faisal Haji Omar	Independent	Muhammad al-Turki	Independent	Resignation
Homs	22 December 2018	Jamal Rabaa	Ba'ath Party	Muhammad Saleh al-Raee	Ba'ath Party	Death.
Hama	22 December 2018	Khader al-Saleh	Ba'ath Party	Basim al-Naameh	Ba'ath Party	Death.
Districts of Aleppo Governorate	19 October 2019	Ali al-Zeidan	Ba'ath Party	Ahmad al-Zeidan	Ba'ath Party	Death.
Idlib	11 January 2020	Ahmad Qabbani	Ba'ath Party	Election not held (Note: While initially scheduled to be held on 11 January 2020, the by-election was postponed due to COVID-19 restrictions, and ultimately never held before the 2020 parliamentary election.)		Death.
