= List of members of the People's Assembly (Syria), 2020–2024 =

This is a list of members elected to the 3rd People's Assembly, following the parliamentary elections held on 19 July 2020, after being postponed from the original date of 13 April 2020. The election took place during the ongoing Syrian Civil War and amid the global COVID-19 pandemic, marking the third parliamentary election conducted during the conflict.

The Ba'ath Party-led National Progressive Front retained its dominant position, winning 183 of the 250 seats, maintaining a reduced two-thirds majority. The elections were boycotted by most opposition groups, both within Syria and in exile.

== Composition ==
Party		Members
NPF	Ba'ath Party	170 / 250 (68%)
NPF	Syrian Social Nationalist Party	3 / 250 (1%)
NPF	Communist (Unified)	3 / 250 (1%)
NPF	Arab Socialist Union Party	2 / 250 (0.8%)
NPF	Socialist Unionist Party	2 / 250 (0.8%)
NPF	National Covenant Party	2 / 250 (0.8%)
NPF	Communist (Bakdash)	1 / 250 (0.4%)
NPF	Democratic Socialist Unionist Party	1 / 250 (0.4%)
NPF	Arab Democratic Union Party	1 / 250 (0.4%)
Independent		67 / 250 (27%)

== Members ==
No.	Electoral district	Sector	Name	Party	Gender	Religion	Ethnicity	Member of the previous Parliament?
1	Damascus	A	Muhammad Izzat Arabi Katbi	Ba'ath Party	Male	Sunni	Arab	Yes
2	Damascus	A	Muhammad Hadi Mashhadiyah	Ba'ath Party	Male	Twelver Shia Shia	Arab	No
3	Damascus	A	Bushra Zurayqa	Ba'ath Party	Female	Sunni	Arab	No
4	Damascus	A	Nidal Muhanna	Ba'ath Party	Male	Alawite	Arab	No
5	Damascus	A	Muhammad Manaf al-Aqqad	Ba'ath Party	Male	Sunni	Arab	Yes
6	Damascus	A	Atif al-Zaybaq	Ba'ath Party	Male	Sunni	Arab	Yes
7	Damascus	A	Nuha Mahayri	Independent	Female	Sunni	Arab	No
8	Damascus	A	Muhammad Akram al-Ajlani	Independent	Male	Sunni	Arab	No
9	Damascus	A	Samer al-Ayyoubi	Independent				
10	Damascus	A	Muhammad Khaled al-Shuweiki	Independent	Male	Sunni	Arab	No
11	Damascus	B	Ahmad Kazbari	Ba'ath Party	Male	Sunni	Arab	Yes
12	Damascus	B	Aref al-Tawil	Ba'ath Party	Male	Sunni	Arab	Yes
13	Damascus	B	Ammar Bakdash	Communist (Bakdash)	Male	Sunni	Kurd	Yes
14	Damascus	B	Elias Shahhoud	Ba'ath Party	Male	Christian	Arab	No
15	Damascus	B	Basima Shater	Ba'ath Party	Female	Sunni	Arab	No
16	Damascus	B	Muhammad Zuheir Tinawi	Ba'ath Party	Male	Sunni	Arab	No
17	Damascus	B	Muhammad Khair al-Akkam	Ba'ath Party				
18	Damascus	B	Mary al-Bitar	Ba'ath Party	Female	Christian	Arab	Yes
19	Damascus	B	Nabil Toumeh	Ba'ath Party	Male	Sunni	Arab	Yes
20	Damascus	B	Sameer Hajjar	SSNP	Male	Sunni	Arab	Yes
21	Damascus	B	Muhammad Ghazwan al-Masri	Ba'ath Party	Male	Sunni	Arab	No
22	Damascus	B	Noura Arisian	Independent	Female	Christian	Armenian	Yes
23	Damascus	B	Samer al-Dibs	Independent	Male	Sunni	Arab	Yes
24	Damascus	B	Muhammad Humam Masouti	Independent	Male	Sunni	Arab	Yes
25	Damascus	B	Bilal al-Naal	Independent	Male	Sunni	Arab	No
26	Damascus	B	Abd al-Rahman al-Jaafari	Independent	Male	Sunni	Arab	No
27	Damascus	B	Jamil Murad	Independent	Male	Christian	Arab	No
28	Damascus	B	Abd al-Rahman al-Masri	Independent	Male	Sunni	Arab	No
29	Damascus	B	Abd al-Rahman Urabi	Independent	Male	Sunni	Arab	No
30	Rif Dimashq	A	Hikmat al-Azab	Ba'ath Party	Male	Sunni	Arab	No
31	Rif Dimashq	A	Haifaa Jumaa	Ba'ath Party	Female	Sunni	Arab	No
32	Rif Dimashq	A	Ali Rashaq	Ba'ath Party	Male	Sunni	Arab	No
33	Rif Dimashq	A	Abd al-Rahman al-Khatib	Ba'ath Party	Male	Sunni	Arab	No
34	Rif Dimashq	A	Muhammad Kabtooleh	Ba'ath Party	Male	Sunni	Arab	No
35	Rif Dimashq	A	Ali al-Sheikh	Ba'ath Party	Male	Sunni	Arab	Yes
36	Rif Dimashq	A	Amer Ubayd	Ba'ath Party	Male	Sunni	Arab	No
37	Rif Dimashq	A	Nabil Darwish	Ba'ath Party	Male	Sunni	Arab	No
38	Rif Dimashq	A	Jamal al-Qadri	Ba'ath Party	Male	Sunni	Arab	Yes
39	Rif Dimashq	A	Muhammad Khair al-Nader	Independent				
40	Rif Dimashq	B	Rimon Hilal	Ba'ath Party	Male	Christian	Arab	Yes
41	Rif Dimashq	B	Osama Mustafa	Ba'ath Party	Male	Sunni	Arab	Yes
42	Rif Dimashq	B	Mustafa Layla	Ba'ath Party				
43	Rif Dimashq	B	Ahmad Jamil Ibrahim	Ba'ath Party	Male	Sunni	Arab	No
44	Rif Dimashq	B	Muhammad Bakhit	Ba'ath Party	Male	Sunni	Arab	No
45	Rif Dimashq	B	Faisal Jammoul	Ba'ath Party	Male	Druze	Arab	No
46	Rif Dimashq	B	Amer Khayti	Independent				
47	Rif Dimashq	B	Ziad Khallouf	Independent	Male	Sunni	Arab	No
48	Rif Dimashq	B	Subhi Abbas	Independent	Male	Alawite	Arab	No
49	Aleppo	A	Mariette Khoury	Ba'ath Party	Female	Christian	Arab	No
50	Aleppo	A	Lucy Iskanyan	Ba'ath Party	Female	Christian	Armenian	No
51	Aleppo	A	Mazen Arslan	Ba'ath Party	Male	Sunni	Arab	No
52	Aleppo	A	Muhammad Rabee Qalaaji	Ba'ath Party	Male	Sunni	Arab	Yes
53	Aleppo	A	Muhammad al-Hasan	Ba'ath Party	Male	Sunni	Arab	No
54	Aleppo	A	Hussam Qaterji	Independent	Male	Sunni	Arab	Yes
55	Aleppo	A	Shadi Dibsi	Independent	Male	Sunni	Arab	No
56	Aleppo	B	Abdo Mousalli	Ba'ath Party	Male	Christian	Arab	No
57	Aleppo	B	Faisal Azzouz	Ba'ath Party	Male	Sunni	Arab	No
58	Aleppo	B	Abd al-Munim al-Sawa	Ba'ath Party	Male	Sunni	Arab	No
59	Aleppo	B	Salloum al-Salloum	Ba'ath Party	Male	Sunni	Arab	Yes
60	Aleppo	B	Maan Qanbour	Ba'ath Party	Male	Sunni	Arab	Yes
61	Aleppo	B	Raafat Darmash	Ba'ath Party	Male	Sunni	Arab	No
62	Aleppo	B	Thanaa Fakhr al-Din	ASU	Female	Sunni	Arab	No
63	Aleppo	B	Al Hasan Berri	Independent	Male	Sunni	Arab	Yes
64	Aleppo	B	Jirayr Ranisian	Independent	Male	Christian	Armenian	Yes
65	Aleppo	B	Muhammad Amer Hamwi	Independent	Male	Sunni	Arab	No
66	Aleppo	B	Najdat Anzour	Independent	Male	Sunni	Circassian	Yes
67	Aleppo	B	Butros Murjana	Independent	Male	Christian	Armenian	No
68	Aleppo	B	Mahmoud Abu Bakr	Independent	Male	Sunni	Arab	No
69	Districts of Aleppo Governorate	A	Qussay al-Thaljah	Ba'ath Party	Male	Sunni	Arab	No
70	Districts of Aleppo Governorate	A	Fadel Kaadeh	Ba'ath Party	Male	Sunni	Arab	Yes
71	Districts of Aleppo Governorate	A	Faten Muhammad	Ba'ath Party	Female	Sunni	Arab	No
72	Districts of Aleppo Governorate	A	Khaled al-Shbeib	Ba'ath Party	Male	Sunni	Arab	No
73	Districts of Aleppo Governorate	A	Ahmad al-Zeidan	Ba'ath Party	Male	Sunni	Arab	No
74	Districts of Aleppo Governorate	A	Ahmad Saleh Ibrahim	Ba'ath Party	Male	Sunni	Arab	Yes
75	Districts of Aleppo Governorate	A	Qassem Hassan	Ba'ath Party	Male	Sunni	Arab	Yes
76	Districts of Aleppo Governorate	A	Hussein Jassim Hamad	Ba'ath Party	Male	Sunni	Arab	Yes
77	Districts of Aleppo Governorate	A	Muhammad al-Asaad	Ba'ath Party	Male	Sunni	Arab	No
78	Districts of Aleppo Governorate	A	Nasr Abdallah	Ba'ath Party	Male	Sunni	Arab	No
79	Districts of Aleppo Governorate	A	Muhammad Fawaz	Ba'ath Party	Male	Sunni	Arab	Yes
80	Districts of Aleppo Governorate	A	Muhammad Jibrayel	Ba'ath Party	Male	Sunni	Arab	No
81	Districts of Aleppo Governorate	A	Obeid al-Obeid al-Issa	Independent	Male	Sunni	Arab	Yes
82	Districts of Aleppo Governorate	A	Omar al-Hasan	Ba'ath Party	Male	Twelver Shia	Arab	Yes
83	Districts of Aleppo Governorate	A	Hussein Hasan al-Jumaah	Independent	Male	Sunni	Arab	Yes
84	Districts of Aleppo Governorate	A	Muhammad Khair al-Mashi	Independent	Male	Sunni	Arab	No
85	Districts of Aleppo Governorate	A	Muhammad Subhi Sheikh al-Daia	Independent	Male	Sunni	Arab	No
86	Districts of Aleppo Governorate	B	Alan Bakr	Ba'ath Party	Male	Sunni	Kurd	Yes
87	Districts of Aleppo Governorate	B	Manal al-Sheikh Amin	Ba'ath Party	Female	Sunni	Arab	Yes
88	Districts of Aleppo Governorate	B	Abd al-Razzaq Barakat	Ba'ath Party	Male	Sunni	Turkmen	No
89	Districts of Aleppo Governorate	B	Taha al-Hajj Ali	Ba'ath Party	Male	Sunni	Arab	No
90	Districts of Aleppo Governorate	B	Eid al-Sweis	Ba'ath Party				
91	Districts of Aleppo Governorate	B	Ahmad Marai	SSNP	Male	Sunni	Arab	Yes
92	Districts of Aleppo Governorate	B	Abd al-Latif al-Bakkar	Ba'ath Party	Male	Sunni	Arab	No
93	Districts of Aleppo Governorate	B	Abd al-Aziz al-Assaf	Ba'ath Party	Male	Sunni	Arab	No
94	Districts of Aleppo Governorate	B	Omar Mahmoud al-Hamdo	Ba'ath Party	Male	Sunni	Arab	Yes
95	Districts of Aleppo Governorate	B	Adnan al-Muhammad	Ba'ath Party	Male	Sunni	Arab	No
96	Districts of Aleppo Governorate	B	Mujib al-Rahman al-Dandan	Independent	Male	Sunni	Arab	Yes
97	Districts of Aleppo Governorate	B	Adnan al-Hamad	Independent	Male	Sunni	Arab	No
98	Districts of Aleppo Governorate	B	Fares Jneidan	Independent	Male	Sunni	Arab	Yes
99	Districts of Aleppo Governorate	B	Ahmad al-Ali al-Hamrah	Independent	Male	Sunni	Arab	Yes
100	Districts of Aleppo Governorate	B	Hassan Shahid	Independent	Male	Sunni	Arab	Yes
101	Homs	A	Abd al-Hamid al-Naqri	Ba'ath Party	Male	Alawite	Arab	No
102	Homs	A	Khalil Ibrahim Khalil	Ba'ath Party	Male	Alawite	Arab	No
103	Homs	A	Nidal Ammar	Ba'ath Party	Male	Alawite	Arab	No
104	Homs	A	Jweida Thaljah	Ba'ath Party	Female	Christian	Arab	No
105	Homs	A	Fadia Deeb	Ba'ath Party	Female	Alawite	Arab	Yes
106	Homs	A	Muhammad Hassan al-Najjar	Ba'ath Party	Male	Sunni	Arab	No
107	Homs	A	Muhammad Raad	Ba'ath Party	Male	Sunni	Arab	Yes
108	Homs	A	Mughith Ibrahim	Ba'ath Party	Male	Alawite	Arab	No
109	Homs	A	Hazzar al-Daqs	Ba'ath Party	Female	Sunni	Arab	Yes
110	Homs	A	Zuheir Tarraf	Independent	Male	Alawite	Arab	No
111	Homs	A	Nasser al-Nasser	Independent	Male	Alawite	Arab	No
112	Homs	B	Muhammad al-Shami	Ba'ath Party	Male	Sunni	Arab	No
113	Homs	B	Nihad Samaan	SSNP	Male	Christian	Arab	No
114	Homs	B	Mundhir Ibrahim	Ba'ath Party	Male	Alawite	Arab	No
115	Homs	B	Muhammad Suleiman al-Abrash	National Covenant	Male	Sunni	Arab	No
116	Homs	B	Mustafa al-Maarouf	Ba'ath Party	Male	Alawite	Arab	No
117	Homs	B	Mayouf al-Dhiab	Ba'ath Party	Male	Sunni	Arab	No
118	Homs	B	Haydar Abboud	Ba'ath Party	Male	Alawite	Arab	No
119	Homs	B	Ahd al-Sukkari	Ba'ath Party	Male	Alawite	Arab	No
120	Homs	B	Youssef al-Salamah	Ba'ath Party	Male	Alawite	Arab	No
121	Homs	B	Firas al-Salloum	Ba'ath Party	Male	Alawite	Arab	Yes
122	Homs	B	Wael Mulhem	Independent	Male	Alawite	Arab	Yes
123	Homs	B	Badii al-Droubi	Independent	Male	Sunni	Arab	Yes
124	Hama	A	Salam Sanqar	Ba'ath Party	Female	Sunni	Arab	Yes
125	Hama	A	Muhammad Sharabi	Ba'ath Party	Male	Sunni	Arab	No
126	Hama	A	Fadel Warda	Ba'ath Party	Male	Ismaili	Arab	Yes
127	Hama	A	Mustafa Khalil	Ba'ath Party	Male	Sunni	Arab	No
128	Hama	A	Maher Qawarma	Ba'ath Party	Male	Christian	Arab	Yes
129	Hama	A	Abd al-Rahman Azkahi	ASU	Male	Sunni	Arab	Yes
130	Hama	A	Mustafa al-Mustafa	Ba'ath Party	Male	Sunni	Arab	No
131	Hama	A	Hussein Abbas	Ba'ath Party	Male	Alawite	Arab	Yes
132	Hama	A	Mohsen Ghazi	Ba'ath Party	Male	Alawite	Arab	No
133	Hama	A	Fayez al-Ahmad	Ba'ath Party	Male	Sunni	Arab	No
134	Hama	A	Abd al-Karim al-Ismail	Independent	Male	Ismaili	Arab	Yes
135	Hama	A	Orouba Mahfoud	Independent	Female	Sunni	Arab	No
136	Hama	A	Muhammad Sharif Abd al-Karim	Independent	Male	Sunni	Arab	No
137	Hama	B	Basim al-Naameh	Ba'ath Party	Male	Ismaili	Arab	No
138	Hama	B	Issam Sabbahi	Ba'ath Party	Male	Sunni	Arab	No
139	Hama	B	Yaghi Ali	Ba'ath Party	Male	Alawite	Arab	No
140	Hama	B	Ayman Malandi	Ba'ath Party	Male	Sunni	Arab	Yes
141	Hama	B	Ghada Ibrahim	Ba'ath Party	Female	Alawite	Arab	Yes
142	Hama	B	Issa Wassouf	Ba'ath Party	Male	Alawite	Arab	No
143	Hama	B	Sariyah Qassem	ADUP	Male	Sunni	Arab	No
144	Hama	B	Abd al-Kafi Aqdeh	Independent	Male	Sunni	Arab	No
145	Hama	B	Asaad Halloum	Independent	Male	Alawite	Arab	No
146	Latakia	A	Ammar al-Assad	Ba'ath Party	Male	Alawite	Arab	Yes
147	Latakia	A	Sameer al-Khatib	Ba'ath Party	Male	Sunni	Arab	Yes
148	Latakia	A	Bassem Sudan	Ba'ath Party	Male	Alawite	Arab	No
149	Latakia	A	Mustafa Kheirbek	Ba'ath Party	Male	Alawite	Arab	Yes
150	Latakia	A	Iskandar Haddad	Ba'ath Party	Male	Christian	Arab	Yes
151	Latakia	A	Muhammad Ajil	Ba'ath Party	Male	Sunni	Arab	No
152	Latakia	A	Maysaa Salih	Ba'ath Party	Female	Alawite	Arab	No
153	Latakia	A	Fawaz Nassour	Independent	Male	Alawite	Arab	Yes
154	Latakia	A	Rasem Masri	Independent	Male	Sunni	Arab	No
155	Latakia	B	Ayham Jreikos	Ba'ath Party	Male	Alawite	Arab	Yes
156	Latakia	B	Hasan Kousa	Ba'ath Party	Male	Alawite	Arab	No
157	Latakia	B	Malek Habib	Ba'ath Party	Male	Alawite	Arab	No
158	Latakia	B	Ayman Ahmad	Ba'ath Party	Male	Alawite	Arab	No
159	Latakia	B	Thaer Hassan	Ba'ath Party	Male	Alawite	Arab	No
160	Latakia	B	Bashir Ghalawunji	Ba'ath Party	Male	Sunni	Arab	No
161	Latakia	B	Nabil Elias	Independent	Male	Christian	Arab	No
162	Latakia	B	Zain al-Abidin Abbas	Independent	Male	Alawite	Arab	No
163	Idlib	A	Safwan Qarbi	Ba'ath Party	Male	Sunni	Arab	Yes
164	Idlib	A	Abd al-Karim al-Youssef	Ba'ath Party	Male	Sunni	Arab	No
165	Idlib	A	Sameer al-Ismail	Ba'ath Party	Male	Twelver Shia	Arab	Yes
166	Idlib	A	Muhammad Kirdoush	Ba'ath Party	Male	Sunni	Arab	No
167	Idlib	A	Ahmad al-Faraj	Ba'ath Party	Male	Sunni	Arab	No
168	Idlib	A	Muhammad Qassem Hamadeh	Ba'ath Party	Male	Sunni	Arab	No
169	Idlib	A	Ghiyath al-Qatini	Ba'ath Party	Male	Sunni	Arab	Yes
170	Idlib	A	Adel al-Shayban	Ba'ath Party	Male	Sunni	Arab	No
171	Idlib	A	Shireen al-Youssef	Ba'ath Party	Male	Sunni	Arab	Yes
172	Idlib	A	Wael Dali	Ba'ath Party	Male	Sunni	Arab	No
173	Idlib	A	Naasan Hijazi	National Covenant	Male	Sunni	Arab	No
174	Idlib	A	Ahmad Aqrin	Independent	Male	Sunni	Arab	No
175	Idlib	B	Fatima Khamis	Ba'ath Party	Female	Sunni	Arab	No
176	Idlib	B	Ahmad Bustaji	Communist (Unified)	Male	Sunni	Arab	No
177	Idlib	B	Khaled Harbeh	Ba'ath Party	Male	Sunni	Arab	No
178	Idlib	B	Jamal Masto	Ba'ath Party	Male	Sunni	Arab	Yes
179	Idlib	B	Maamoun al-Sayyid	Ba'ath Party	Male	Sunni	Arab	No
180	Idlib	B	Fouad Aldani	Independent	Male	Sunni	Arab	No
181	Tartus	A	Siham al-Othman	Ba'ath Party	Female	Alawite	Arab	No
182	Tartus	A	Ahmad Ali Hasan	Ba'ath Party	Male	Alawite	Arab	No
183	Tartus	A	Abbas Izz al-Din Abbas	Ba'ath Party	Male	Alawite	Arab	No
184	Tartus	A	Muhammad Jari	Ba'ath Party	Male	Alawite	Arab	No
185	Tartus	A	Rania Hassan	Ba'ath Party	Female	Alawite	Arab	No
186	Tartus	A	Suhail Khadr	Independent	Male	Alawite	Arab	No
187	Tartus	B	Rami Saleh	Ba'ath Party	Male	Alawite	Arab	No
188	Tartus	B	Tony Hanna	Ba'ath Party	Male	Christian	Arab	Yes
189	Tartus	B	Nasr Hassan	Ba'ath Party	Male	Alawite	Arab	No
190	Tartus	B	Akram Abd al-Jalil	Ba'ath Party	Male	Sunni	Arab	No
191	Tartus	B	Ayman Bilal	Ba'ath Party	Male	Alawite	Arab	Yes
192	Tartus	B	Maan Muhammad	DSUP	Male	Sunni	Arab	No
193	Tartus	B	Mahmoud Bilal	Independent	Male	Alawite	Arab	No
194	Raqqa	A	Fayez al-Abdallah	Ba'ath Party	Male	Sunni	Arab	No
195	Raqqa	A	Maha al-Ajeili	Ba'ath Party	Female	Sunni	Arab	Yes
196	Raqqa	A	Khaled al-Darwish	Ba'ath Party	Male	Sunni	Arab	Yes
197	Raqqa	A	Bashar al-Makhsoor	Independent	Male	Sunni	Arab	No
198	Raqqa	B	Nidal al-Alou	Ba'ath Party	Male	Sunni	Kurd	No
199	Raqqa	B	Ahmad al-Humaidi	Ba'ath Party	Male	Sunni	Arab	No
200	Raqqa	B	Ismail al-Hajjo	Communist (Unified)	Male	Irreligion	Kurd	Yes
201	Raqqa	B	Muhammad al-Turki	Independent	Male	Sunni	Arab	No
202	Deir ez-Zor	A	Ali Adel al-Hajj Khalifah	Ba'ath Party	Male	Sunni	Arab	No
203	Deir ez-Zor	A	Muhammad al-Raja	Ba'ath Party	Male	Twelver Shia	Arab	Yes
204	Deir ez-Zor	A	Mahmoud al-Rayyes	Ba'ath Party	Male	Sunni	Arab	No
205	Deir ez-Zor	A	Bashar al-Mutlaq	Ba'ath Party				
206	Deir ez-Zor	A	Mayyada al-Ali	Ba'ath Party	Female	Sunni	Arab	No
207	Deir ez-Zor	A	Taha al-Khalifah	Ba'ath Party				
208	Deir ez-Zor	A	Burhan al-Abd al-Wahhab	Ba'ath Party	Male	Sunni	Arab	Yes
209	Deir ez-Zor	A	Muhanna Sheikh Fayyad al-Nasser	Independent	Male	Sunni	Arab	Yes
210	Deir ez-Zor	B	Adnan al-Jum'ah	Socialist Unionist	Male	Sunni	Arab	No
211	Deir ez-Zor	B	Abd al-Aziz al-Hussein	Ba'ath Party	Male	Twelver Shia	Arab	No
212	Deir ez-Zor	B	Maryam al-Mutras	Ba'ath Party	Female	Sunni	Arab	No
213	Deir ez-Zor	B	Sheikh al-Kharfan	Ba'ath Party	Male	Sunni	Arab	No
214	Deir ez-Zor	B	Aytan al-Aytan	Ba'ath Party	Male	Sunni	Arab	No
215	Deir ez-Zor	B	Madloul al-Aziz	Independent	Male	Twelver Shia	Arab	No
216	Al-Hasakah	A	Muhammad al-Fallaj	Ba'ath Party	Male	Sunni	Arab	No
217	Al-Hasakah	A	Abd al-Rahman Khalil	Communist (Unified)	Male	Sunni	Kurd	No
218	Al-Hasakah	A	Abboud al-Shawakh	Ba'ath Party	Male	Sunni	Arab	Yes
219	Al-Hasakah	A	Khaled al-Hussein al-Hammadeh	Ba'ath Party	Male	Sunni	Arab	No
220	Al-Hasakah	A	Ali al-Jadha'an	Ba'ath Party	Male	Sunni	Arab	No
221	Al-Hasakah	A	Hassan Salloumi	Ba'ath Party	Male	Sunni	Arab	Yes
222	Al-Hasakah	A	Alaa al-Din al-Hamad	Independent	Male	Sunni	Arab	Yes
223	Al-Hasakah	A	Muhammad al-Shammam	Independent	Male	Sunni	Arab	No
224	Al-Hasakah	B	Khaled al-Atiyah	Ba'ath Party	Male	Sunni	Arab	Yes
225	Al-Hasakah	B	Nour Durrah	Ba'ath Party	Female	Christian	Assyrian	Yes
226	Al-Hasakah	B	Hammouda Sabbagh	Ba'ath Party	Male	Christian	Arab	Yes
227	Al-Hasakah	B	Talal al-Khalil	Ba'ath Party	Male	Sunni	Arab	No
228	Al-Hasakah	B	Abd al-Hamid al-Zaher	Independent	Male	Sunni	Arab	No
229	Al-Hasakah	B	Hassan al-Musallat	Independent	Male	Sunni	Arab	Yes
230	Daraa	A	Ahmad al-Suwaidan	Ba'ath Party	Male	Sunni	Arab	No
231	Daraa	A	Walid al-Salih	Ba'ath Party	Male	Sunni	Arab	No
232	Daraa	A	Manaf al-Fallah	Ba'ath Party	Male	Sunni	Arab	No
233	Daraa	A	Shukri al-Jundi	Ba'ath Party	Male	Sunni	Arab	No
234	Daraa	A	Farouq al-Hamadi	Independent	Male	Sunni	Arab	No
235	Daraa	B	Muflih al-Nasrallah	Ba'ath Party	Male	Sunni	Arab	No
236	Daraa	B	Abdul-Nasser al-Hariri	Ba'ath Party	Male	Sunni	Arab	No
237	Daraa	B	Faiza al-Adhbah	Ba'ath Party	Female	Sunni	Arab	Yes
238	Daraa	B	Khaled al-Abboud	Socialist Unionist	Male	Sunni	Arab	Yes
239	Daraa	B	Yahya al-Mafaalani	Independent	Male	Sunni	Arab	No
240	Suwayda	A	Khaled Karbaj	Ba'ath Party	Male	Druze	Arab	No
241	Suwayda	A	Majd Abu Zaidan	Ba'ath Party	Female	Druze	Arab	No
242	Suwayda	A	Nasib Abu Mahmoud	Ba'ath Party	Male	Druze	Arab	No
243	Suwayda	A	Nashaat al-Atrash	Independent	Male	Druze	Arab	Yes
244	Suwayda	B	Hikmat Salam	Ba'ath Party	Male	Druze	Arab	No
245	Suwayda	B	Mueen Nasr	Independent	Male	Druze	Arab	No
246	Quneitra	A	Wahid al-Zaal	Ba'ath Party	Male	Sunni	Arab	No
247	Quneitra	A	Rida al-Damqasi	Ba'ath Party	Male	Druze	Arab	No
248	Quneitra	A	Raafat Bakkar	Independent	Male	Sunni	Arab	No
249	Quneitra	B	Shadi Saleh	Ba'ath Party	Male	Sunni	Arab	No
250	Quneitra	B	Khaled al-Sharaabi	Independent	Male	Sunni	Arab	No

== By-elections ==
Electoral district	Date	Previous incumbent	Party	Winner	Party	Cause
Deir ez-Zor	12 December 2020	Taha al-Khalifah	Ba'ath Party	Yasser al-Salama	Ba'ath Party	Resignation
Homs	27 November 2021	Fadia Deeb	Ba'ath Party	Bassam al-Muhammad	Ba'ath Party	Resignation
Deir ez-Zor	13 March 2022	Adnan al-Jum'ah	Socialist Unionist	Bashar Shubat	Socialist Unionist	Death.
Damascus	2 July 2022	Noura Arisian	Independent	Ruba Mirza	Independent	Resigned after being appointed ambassador to Armenia.
Rif Dimashq	3 December 2022	Ahmad Jamil Ibrahim	Ba'ath Party	Muhammad Qaddour al-Ainiya	Ba'ath Party	Death.
Districts of Aleppo Governorate	3 December 2022	Fadel Kaadeh	Ba'ath Party	Adnan Shahadeh	Ba'ath Party	Death.
Damascus	29 April 2023	Basima Shater	Ba'ath Party	Muhammad Nabil al-Homsi	Ba'ath Party	Death.

== See also ==
- Parliament of Syria
- Elections in Syria
- Politics of Syria
