= List of members of the People's Assembly (Syria), 1998–2002 =

This is a list of members elected to the 7th People's Assembly, following the 1998 parliamentary election.

== Members ==
No.	Electoral district	Sector	Name	Party
1	Damascus	A	Mahmoud Zaatariya	
2	Damascus	A	Mahasin al-Waraa	
3	Damascus	A	Abd al-Razzaq Aqbiq	
4	Damascus	A	Farouk Thuraya	
5	Damascus	A	Muhammad Raafat al-Kurdi	
6	Damascus	A	Abd al-Qadir Qaddura	Ba'ath Party
7	Damascus	A	Nabil Dawoud	Independent
8	Damascus	A	Muhammad Marwan Sheikho	
9	Damascus	A	Basil Dahdouh	
10	Damascus	A	Muhammad Yasser Nahlawi	
11	Damascus	B	Maha Qunout	
12	Damascus	B	Ahmad Sameer al-Nouri	
13	Damascus	B	Huda al-Homsi	Ba'ath Party
14	Damascus	B	Muhammad Issam al-Jammal	
15	Damascus	B	Muhammad Shakir Asaid	
16	Damascus	B	Akram al-Khoury	
17	Damascus	B	Muhammad Bashar al-Shami	
18	Damascus	B	Munther Mousalli	
19	Damascus	B	Mahmoud Sheikh al-Shabab	
20	Damascus	B	Abd al-Wahhab Rashwani	
21	Damascus	B	Muhammad Mamoun al-Homsi	
22	Damascus	B	Riad Seif	Independent
23	Damascus	B	Hashem al-Aqqad	Independent
24	Damascus	B	Baha al-Din al-Hassan	Independent
25	Damascus	B	Badi' Fallaheh	
26	Damascus	B	Muhammad Aref Hannano	
27	Damascus	B	Adnan al-Dakhakhni	Independent
28	Damascus	B	Muhyi al-Din al-Habboush	
29	Damascus	B	Hassan al-Nouri	
30	Rif Dimashq	A	Ayman Zeidan	
31	Rif Dimashq	A	Sameera Kashka	
32	Rif Dimashq	A	Tahir Abu Khalif	
33	Rif Dimashq	A	Omar al-Shalt	
34	Rif Dimashq	A	Irfan al-Baradai	
35	Rif Dimashq	A	Abd al-Latif Hussein	
36	Rif Dimashq	A	Rifat al-Tarshan	
37	Rif Dimashq	A	Samia al-Shaer	
38	Rif Dimashq	A	Abd al-Aziz Maqali	Independent
39	Rif Dimashq	A	Mahmoud Diab	
40	Rif Dimashq	B	Ahmad Qablan	
41	Rif Dimashq	B	Mamoun al-Qastalani	
42	Rif Dimashq	B	Ali Awad	
43	Rif Dimashq	B	Suleiman Moussa	
44	Rif Dimashq	B	Mustafa al-Tajjar	
45	Rif Dimashq	B	Abd al-Karim al-Khouli	
46	Rif Dimashq	B	Abd al-Rahman al-Ahmar	
47	Rif Dimashq	B	Ahmad al-Turk	
48	Rif Dimashq	B	Othman Jumaa	
49	Aleppo	A	Ali Taljebini	
50	Aleppo	A	Abd al-Rahman Abriq	
51	Aleppo	A	Muhammad Jawhar	
52	Aleppo	A	Ahmad Tawfiq Qarna	
53	Aleppo	A	Jumana Radwan	Communist (Bakdash)
54	Aleppo	A	Munir Janat	
55	Aleppo	A	Abd al-Qadir Zayat	
56	Aleppo	B	Ferial Sattal	
57	Aleppo	B	Muawiya Abd al-Wahid	
58	Aleppo	B	Adnan al-Sukhni	
59	Aleppo	B	Muhammad Zafir Kayyali	
60	Aleppo	B	Jurji Hazim	
61	Aleppo	B	Simon Ibrahim	
62	Aleppo	B	Abdallah Mousalli	
63	Aleppo	B	Muhammad Mansour	
64	Aleppo	B	Ahmad Berri	
65	Aleppo	B	Abd al-Aziz al-Shami	
66	Aleppo	B	Sabah al-Din Abu Qaws	
67	Aleppo	B	Muhammad Saleh al-Mallah	Independent
68	Aleppo	B	Abd al-Malik Berri	
69	Districts of Aleppo Governorate	A	Muhammad Qaraa	
70	Districts of Aleppo Governorate	A	Muhammad Jamal Hassou	
71	Districts of Aleppo Governorate	A	Fatinah al-Ahmad	
72	Districts of Aleppo Governorate	A	Fawzia Safou	
73	Districts of Aleppo Governorate	A	Abd al-Fattah Omar	
74	Districts of Aleppo Governorate	A	Nouri al-Arif	
75	Districts of Aleppo Governorate	A	Manar Nattour	
76	Districts of Aleppo Governorate	A	Ismat Mahalli	Ba'ath Party
77	Districts of Aleppo Governorate	A	Muhammad al-Sattam	
78	Districts of Aleppo Governorate	A	Ahmad al-Hussein	
79	Districts of Aleppo Governorate	A	Ali al-Salem	
80	Districts of Aleppo Governorate	A	Sami al-Shihabi	
81	Districts of Aleppo Governorate	A	Diab al-Mashi	Independent
82	Districts of Aleppo Governorate	A	Muhammad al-Bish	
83	Districts of Aleppo Governorate	A	Ibrahim Houri	
84	Districts of Aleppo Governorate	A	Abd al-Qadir Nanaa	
85	Districts of Aleppo Governorate	A	Khalil al-Safouk	
86	Districts of Aleppo Governorate	B	Ahmad Haji Mahmoud	Ba'ath Party
87	Districts of Aleppo Governorate	B	Muhammad Gharib	
88	Districts of Aleppo Governorate	B	Ahmad al-Said	
89	Districts of Aleppo Governorate	B	Muhammad Said Said	
90	Districts of Aleppo Governorate	B	Muhammad al-Hassan	
91	Districts of Aleppo Governorate	B	Ahmad Haj Suleiman	Ba'ath Party
92	Districts of Aleppo Governorate	B	Muhammad Nawras al-Razzouq	
93	Districts of Aleppo Governorate	B	Ali al-Zwein	Ba'ath Party
94	Districts of Aleppo Governorate	B	Naeem al-Alawi	
95	Districts of Aleppo Governorate	B	Abd al-Hamid al-Ghabari	Independent
96	Districts of Aleppo Governorate	B	Kamal Al Ammo	Independent
97	Districts of Aleppo Governorate	B	Abd al-Hadi al-Jammal	
98	Districts of Aleppo Governorate	B	Alaa al-Din Shaheima	
99	Districts of Aleppo Governorate	B	Muhammad Melhem	
100	Districts of Aleppo Governorate	B	Muhammad Naasan	
101	Homs	A	Youssef al-Shaar	
102	Homs	A	Qassem al-Harb	
103	Homs	A	Mahmoud al-Diab	
104	Homs	A	Nihad Zantah	
105	Homs	A	Muhammad Khalid al-Haraki	
106	Homs	A	Khadr al-Naim	
107	Homs	A	Zuhair Jbour	
108	Homs	A	Mahmoud al-Fadous	Independent
109	Homs	A	Iqbal Ibrahim	
110	Homs	A	Abd al-Aziz al-Mulhim	Ba'ath Party
111	Homs	A	Taha al-Maghribi	
112	Homs	B	Abd al-Karim al-Hisni	
113	Homs	B	Ibrahim Haswa	
114	Homs	B	Adiba Hamwi	
115	Homs	B	Umaima Khaddour	
116	Homs	B	Khalid al-Mansour	
117	Homs	B	Abd al-Bari al-Tahhan	
118	Homs	B	Ammar Daraq al-Sibai	
119	Homs	B	Issam al-Masri	
120	Homs	B	Abd al-Wahhab Awda	
121	Homs	B	Ahmad al-Sheikh	Independent
122	Homs	B	Shahadeh Mayhoub	Independent
123	Homs	B	Abdallah Tlass	
124	Hama	A	Amin Asfar	
125	Hama	A	Ibrahim Jirjanazi	
126	Hama	A	Sudayf al-Assad	
127	Hama	A	Hussein Muhammad al-Hussein	
128	Hama	A	Jawdat Afour	
129	Hama	A	Muhammad Said	
130	Hama	A	Ibrahim Abbas	
131	Hama	A	Faten al-Sheikh Khaled	
132	Hama	A	Ibrahim Ali Ibrahim	
133	Hama	A	Mustafa Abd al-Rahman	
134	Hama	A	Ibrahim Khalil	
135	Hama	A	Abd al-Karim al-Ismail	Independent
136	Hama	A	Khaled Muhammad	Independent
137	Hama	B	Mahmoud Arwani	
138	Hama	B	Ahmad al-Ahmad	
139	Hama	B	Younes al-Saleh	
140	Hama	B	Fadi Ayyash	
141	Hama	B	Souad al-Sheikh Bakkour	Ba'ath Party
142	Hama	B	Bahjat Assad	
143	Hama	B	Bashar al-Halabiyah	
144	Hama	B	Ahmad al-Khattab	
145	Hama	B	Mayad Yaqub	
146	Latakia	A	Haifa Saqr	
147	Latakia	A	Rafiq Darwish	
148	Latakia	A	Nawfal Nawfal	Arab Socialist Union Party
149	Latakia	A	Fares Iskandar	
150	Latakia	A	Youssef Hassan	
151	Latakia	A	Farouk Shamout	
152	Latakia	A	Muhammad Fakhri al-Sayyid	
153	Latakia	A	Ibrahim al-Lawza	
154	Latakia	A	Nizar Ismail	
155	Latakia	B	Jamil al-Assad	Ba'ath Party
156	Latakia	B	Ahmad Abu Musa	
157	Latakia	B	Al-Mundhir Maarouf	
158	Latakia	B	Suhair Reis	
159	Latakia	B	Mouaffaq Makkiya	
160	Latakia	B	Muhammad Saad	
161	Latakia	B	Muhammad Ali Nasser	
162	Latakia	B	Mahdi Khairbek	
163	Idlib	A	Ali Hamdoun	
164	Idlib	A	Nadia Hashem	
165	Idlib	A	Ahmad Taleb	
166	Idlib	A	Muhammad Soufi	
167	Idlib	A	Hikmat Khattab	
168	Idlib	A	Malek Awad	
169	Idlib	A	Saeed Aliko	
170	Idlib	A	Majd al-Din Issa	
171	Idlib	A	Nafidha Nibal al-Muallem	
172	Idlib	A	Abd al-Aziz al-Yousef	
173	Idlib	A	Muhammad al-Omar	
174	Idlib	A	Nasr al-Yousef	
175	Idlib	B	Walid Abdallah	
176	Idlib	B	Adnan Makhzoumi	
177	Idlib	B	Ahmad Shafi Kayyali	Ba'ath Party
178	Idlib	B	Muhammad Nihad Mishantat	
179	Idlib	B	Muhammad Jawish	
180	Idlib	B	Najdat al-Yousef	
181	Tartus	A	Muhammad Mayhoub	
182	Tartus	A	Nasr Mahrez	
183	Tartus	A	Mahmoud Afif	
184	Tartus	A	Wajih al-Sheikh	
185	Tartus	A	Waad Khaddam	
186	Tartus	A	Inam Abbas	
187	Tartus	B	Ramadan Atiya	
188	Tartus	B	Suhail Zidan	
189	Tartus	B	Imad al-Din Suleiman	
190	Tartus	B	Abboud Abboud	
191	Tartus	B	Ahmad Azil	
192	Tartus	B	Muhammad Suleiman	Ba'ath Party
193	Tartus	B	Mohsen Imran	
194	Raqqa	A	Ali al-Ibrahim	
195	Raqqa	A	Ismail al-Ali	
196	Raqqa	A	Mustafa al-Ayed	
197	Raqqa	A	Shaban al-Hamoud al-Khalaf	
198	Raqqa	B	Nadwa al-Salloum	
199	Raqqa	B	Muhammad Jamil al-Hajwan	
200	Raqqa	B	Muhammad Najib al-Mustafa	
201	Raqqa	B	Jasim al-Humaidan	
201	Deir ez-Zor	A	Ahmad al-Hammad	
202	Deir ez-Zor	A	Zahra al-Jassem	
203	Deir ez-Zor	A	Adeesh al-Ghadban	
204	Deir ez-Zor	A	Abd al-Samad Nouwara	
205	Deir ez-Zor	A	Omar Salibi	
206	Deir ez-Zor	A	Ayman Raja al-Muhammad al-Dandal	
207	Deir ez-Zor	A	Naji al-Sheikh Fares	
208	Deir ez-Zor	A	Hamad al-Sheikh al-Jalilat	
209	Deir ez-Zor	B	Abd al-Razzaq al-Awwad	
210	Deir ez-Zor	B	Abboud al-Saleh	Ba'ath Party
211	Deir ez-Zor	B	Ragheb al-Ali al-Soufi	
212	Deir ez-Zor	B	Najm al-Din Jawish al-Kharit	
213	Deir ez-Zor	B	Khalil al-Hafl	Independent
214	Deir ez-Zor	B	Faisal al-Najras	Independent
215	Al-Hasakah	A	Faeq Ramo	
216	Al-Hasakah	A	Asaad al-Sahou	
217	Al-Hasakah	A	Abd al-Ahad Safar	
218	Al-Hasakah	A	Abd al-Rahman al-Awwad	
219	Al-Hasakah	A	Muhammad al-Ali	
220	Al-Hasakah	A	Hamed al-Jassem	
221	Al-Hasakah	A	Alaa al-Din al-Hamad	
222	Al-Hasakah	A	Abd al-Aziz al-Issa	
223	Al-Hasakah	B	Ahmad Hussein Hassan	
224	Al-Hasakah	B	Najwa Tushan	
225	Al-Hasakah	B	Muhammad Haitham Dweihi	
226	Al-Hasakah	B	Abd al-Rahman Abd al-Karim	
227	Al-Hasakah	B	Sameer Mustafa Pasha	
228	Al-Hasakah	B	Ziya Malak Ismail	Independent
229	Daraa	A	Muhammad Jamil Muharib	
230	Daraa	A	Awda al-Qassis	
231	Daraa	A	Abdallah al-Zoubi	
232	Daraa	A	Moussa al-Karoud	
233	Daraa	A	Youssef Abu Roumiya al-Saadi	Independent
234	Daraa	B	Ali Batha	
235	Daraa	B	Hussein al-Rifai	
236	Daraa	B	Hasna Awad	
237	Daraa	B	Naser al-Hariri	Independent
238	Daraa	B	Khalaf al-Ali	
239	Suwayda	A	Sabir Falhout	Ba'ath Party
240	Suwayda	A	Shibli Jnoun	
241	Suwayda	A	Hani al-Hajjar	
242	Suwayda	A	Abdallah al-Atrash	Independent
243	Suwayda	B	Kamal Ballan	
244	Suwayda	B	Kamal Amer	Independent
245	Quneitra	A	Ali al-Mazal	
246	Quneitra	A	Midhat al-Saleh	
247	Quneitra	A	Abd al-Hadi al-Diyab	
248	Quneitra	B	Sharaf al-Din Abaza	
249	Quneitra	B	Khalid Hassan al-Abboud	

== By-elections ==
Electoral district	Date	Previous incumbent	Party	Winner	Party	Cause
Districts of Aleppo Governorate	9 April 1999	Alaa al-Din Shaheima		Muhammad Sameh Jazmati		Death.
Aleppo	9 April 1999	Ali Taljebini		Walid Ikhlasi		Death.
Rif Dimashq	8 December 2000	Mustafa al-Tajjar		Jadallah Qaddour	Arab Socialist Movement	Death.
Homs	2001	Ibrahim Haswa		Mohammed Ghassan al-Masri		Death.
Damascus	2001	Muhammad Marwan Sheikho		Ghalib Aniz		Death.
