= Aleppo (former People's Assembly electoral district) =

Former electoral district of Syria's national legislature

- Former electoral district for the People's Assembly
- Governorate: Aleppo

Former electoral district
- Created: 1973
- Abolished: 2025
- Seats: List: 20 (1990–2025); 16 (1973–1990)
- Created from: Aleppo
- Replaced by: Mount Simeon

Aleppo (Arabic: حلب) was an electoral district used to elect members of the Syrian People's Assembly between 1973 and 2025.

== Electoral system ==
The electoral system used to elect the People's Assembly was introduced in 1973 and remained in use until the assembly's dissolution in 2025. Each governorate formed a single, large electoral district, except for Aleppo Governorate, which was divided into two districts: the city of Aleppo and the rural districts of Aleppo Governorate. Within each district, seats were awarded on a block-vote basis, with the candidates receiving the largest number of votes taking all of the seats allocated to it, and the assembly was composed of representatives of two sectors, "workers and peasants" and "other sectors of the people", with the former guaranteed at least half of its seats nationally. The number of seats, and their distribution among districts, was left to the president of the republic to set by decree rather than being fixed in law; the total was raised from 186 to 195 in 1981 and from 195 to 250 in 1990, after which the distribution among the fifteen electoral districts was not changed.

All Syrian citizens aged 18 and over were entitled to vote, other than those under legal guardianship, those with a mental illness affecting their legal capacity, and those convicted of a felony or a "dishonourable" misdemeanour, while serving members of the armed forces and police were barred from voting and from standing as candidates; candidates were further required to be at least 25 years old and to have held Syrian nationality for at least five years, a period raised to ten under the 2011 and 2014 electoral laws. During the 2011 reform of the electoral law, the replacement of this system was discussed because of its weak representativeness, but the large-district, block-vote system was retained; the reform instead moved the administration of elections from the Ministry of Interior and provincial governors to an independent Supreme Judicial Committee for Elections, a structure carried over into a further law passed in 2014 that consolidated the rules for presidential, parliamentary and local-council elections into a single statute.

Beyond being considered unrepresentative — a majoritarian, large-district system of a kind rejected by most electoral systems worldwide — the system has also been criticised for the unevenness of its distribution of seats between governorates. Based on the number of registered voters at the 2012 election, the average was around 59,000 voters per seat nationally, but the ratio varied considerably: about 37,800 voters per seat in Damascus and 51,500 in Tartus, compared with 71,700 in Al-Hasakah and 69,500 in the rural districts of Aleppo Governorate, with no mechanism beyond a presidential decree governing the size of constituencies or the allocation of seats between them.

== Members ==
Elections	MPA (Party)	MPA (Party)	MPA (Party)	MPA (Party)	MPA (Party)	MPA (Party)	MPA (Party)	MPA (Party)	MPA (Party)	MPA (Party)	MPA (Party)	MPA (Party)	MPA (Party)	MPA (Party)	MPA (Party)	MPA (Party)	MPA (Party)	MPA (Party)	MPA (Party)	MPA (Party)
1973	Abd al-Majid Nasir (N/A)	Muhammad Subhi Sheikhuni (N/A)	Muhammad Fateh Hamwi (N/A)	Surur Yazji (N/A)	Leon Ghazal (N/A)	Abdul Karim Azizi (N/A)	Ibrahim al-Salqini (N/A)	Muhammad Adel Jamous (N/A)	Muhammad Adil Haj Murad (N/A)	Muhammad Bahjat Maslati (N/A)	Muhammad Zayn al-Abidin Khairallah (N/A)	Badr al-Din Quja (N/A)	Omar al-Sibai (SCP)	Muhammad Adib Nahwi (N/A)	Abdallah Mousalli (N/A)	Ahmad Hafyan (N/A)	16 seats			
1977	Abd al-Wahhab al-Hassan (N/A)	Hussein Abu Amsha (N/A)	Sobhi Sheikhouni (N/A)	Ali Teljebini (N/A)	Abboud Haddad (N/A)	Rajab al-Manla (N/A)	Muhammad Dhafer Khairallah (N/A)	Muhammad Adel Jamous (N/A)	Tarif Kayyali (N/A)	Ali Rida (N/A)	Ahmad Hawi (N/A)	Nader Mohsen (N/A)	Omar al-Sibai (SCP)	Albert Hanna Abdallah (N/A)	Abdallah Mousalli (N/A)	Grigor Ablighatian (N/A)	16 seats			
1981	Darwish Darwish (N/A)	Ahmad al-Labid (N/A)	Muhammad Fateh Hamwi (N/A)	Ali Kassado (N/A)	Abboud Haddad (N/A)	Mahmoud Shuwayhina (N/A)	Muhammad Dhafer Khairallah (N/A)	Muhammad Adel Jamous (N/A)	Muhammad Zuhair Masharqa (N/A)	Ali Rida (N/A)	Malak Martini (N/A)	Adnan Eid (N/A)	Jurji Azar (N/A)	Muhammad Nuri Antabi (N/A)	Abdallah Mousalli (N/A)	Grigor Ablighatian (N/A)	16 seats			
1986	Darwish Darwish (N/A)	Ahmad al-Labid (N/A)	Muhammad Fateh Hamwi (N/A)	Ahmad Tawfiq Qarna (N/A)	Ali Basmaji (N/A)	Layla al-Turkmani (N/A)	Muhammad Dhafer Khairallah (N/A)	Muhammad Adel Jamous (N/A)	Adnan Ismail (N/A)	Ali Rida (N/A)	Malak Martini (N/A)	Farajallah Mousalli (N/A)	Jurji Azar (N/A)	Muhammad Raed Beiraqdar (N/A)	Abdallah Mousalli (N/A)	Grigor Ablighatian (N/A)	16 seats			
1990	Darwish Darwish (N/A)	Ahmad al-Labid (N/A)	Muhammad Fateh Hamwi (N/A)	Ahmad Tawfiq Qarna (N/A)	Manar Nattour (N/A)	Layla al-Turkmani (N/A)	Ahmad Muwalidi (N/A)	Muhammad Adel Jamous (N/A)	Muhammad Ali Shuwayhina (N/A)	Hussein Kaaka (N/A)	Ala al-Din Zaitoun (N/A)	Ahmad Eido (N/A)	Jurji Azar (N/A)	Omar Wasfi Martini (N/A)	Muhammad Marwan Saqqal (N/A)	Mustafa Sukari (N/A)	Ahmad Badr al-Din Hassoun (Ind.)	Muhammad Adel Houri (N/A)	Abd al-Aziz al-Shami (N/A)	Ibrahim Azzouz (N/A)
1992 by-election	Darwish Darwish (N/A)	Ahmad al-Labid (N/A)	Grigor Ablighatian (N/A)	Ahmad Tawfiq Qarna (N/A)	Manar Nattour (N/A)	Layla al-Turkmani (N/A)	Ahmad Muwalidi (N/A)	Muhammad Adel Jamous (N/A)	Muhammad Ali Shuwayhina (N/A)	Hussein Kaaka (N/A)	Ala al-Din Zaitoun (N/A)	Ahmad Eido (N/A)	Jurji Azar (N/A)	Omar Wasfi Martini (N/A)	Muhammad Marwan Saqqal (N/A)	Mustafa Sukari (N/A)	Ahmad Badr al-Din Hassoun (Ind.)	Muhammad Adel Houri (N/A)	Abd al-Aziz al-Shami (N/A)	Ibrahim Azzouz (N/A)
1994	Rashid Akhterini (N/A)	Ahmad Sameer al-Taqi (N/A)	Hassan Ghazi Turkmani (N/A)	Ahmad Tawfiq Qarna (N/A)	Sameer Salem (N/A)	Simon Ibrahim (N/A)	Ahmad Qazzaz (N/A)	Muhammad Adel Jamous (N/A)	Ahmad Ayoud (N/A)	Hussein Kaaka (N/A)	Farouk Ibram (N/A)	Ferial Sattal (N/A)	Jurji Azar (N/A)	Muhammad Akkad (N/A)	Abdallah Mousalli (N/A)	Nadia Ghazi (N/A)	Ahmad Badr al-Din Hassoun (Ind.)	Muhammad Saleh al-Mallah (Ind.)	Abd al-Aziz al-Shami (N/A)	Mahmoud Berri (N/A)
1998	Ali Taljebini (N/A)	Abd al-Rahman Abriq (N/A)	Muhammad Jawhar (N/A)	Ahmad Tawfiq Qarna (N/A)	Jumana Radwan (SCP-B)	Simon Ibrahim (N/A)	Munir Janat (N/A)	Abd al-Qadir Zayat (N/A)	Ferial Sattal (N/A)	Muawiya Abd al-Wahid (N/A)	Adnan al-Sukhni (Ba'ath)	Muhammad Zafir Kayyali (N/A)	Jurji Hazim (N/A)	Muhammad Mansour (N/A)	Abdallah Mousalli (N/A)	Ahmad Berri (N/A)	Sabah al-Din Abu Qaws (N/A)	Muhammad Saleh al-Mallah (Ind.)	Abd al-Aziz al-Shami (N/A)	Abd al-Malik Berri (N/A)
1999 by-election	Walid Ikhlasi (N/A)	Abd al-Rahman Abriq (N/A)	Muhammad Jawhar (N/A)	Ahmad Tawfiq Qarna (N/A)	Jumana Radwan (SCP-B)	Simon Ibrahim (N/A)	Munir Janat (N/A)	Abd al-Qadir Zayat (N/A)	Ferial Sattal (N/A)	Muawiya Abd al-Wahid (N/A)	Adnan al-Sukhni (Ba'ath)	Muhammad Zafir Kayyali (N/A)	Jurji Hazim (N/A)	Muhammad Mansour (N/A)	Abdallah Mousalli (N/A)	Ahmad Berri (N/A)	Sabah al-Din Abu Qaws (N/A)	Muhammad Saleh al-Mallah (Ind.)	Abd al-Aziz al-Shami (N/A)	Abd al-Malik Berri (N/A)
2003	Muhammad Shaban Azzouz (Ba'ath)	Muhammad Safi Abu Dan (N/A)	Suhail Muhmandar (N/A)	Ferial Siris (N/A)	Ahmad Dabbas (N/A)	Abd al-Aziz al-Shami (Ind.)	Abd al-Rahman Salqini (N/A)	Muhammad Adel Jamous (N/A)	Mahmoud Mumtaz Sultan (N/A)	Muhammad Naji al-Otari (Ba'ath)	Adnan al-Sukhni (Ba'ath)	Haitham Sousli (N/A)	Mahmoud al-Wahab (N/A)	Edward Khouly (N/A)	Abdallah Mousalli (N/A)	Ahmad Berri (N/A)	Sonbol Sonbolian (Ind.)	Muhammad Saleh al-Mallah (Ind.)	Khaled Alabi (Ind.)	Hisham Khankan (N/A)
2005 by-election	Muhammad Shaban Azzouz (Ba'ath)	Muhammad Safi Abu Dan (N/A)	Suhail Muhmandar (N/A)	Ferial Siris (N/A)	Ahmad Dabbas (N/A)	Abd al-Aziz al-Shami (Ind.)	Abd al-Rahman Salqini (N/A)	Muhammad Adel Jamous (N/A)	Mahmoud Mumtaz Sultan (N/A)	Muhammad Naji al-Otari (Ba'ath)	Adnan al-Sukhni (Ba'ath)	Haitham Sousli (N/A)	Mahmoud al-Wahab (N/A)	Edward Khouly (N/A)	Abdallah Mousalli (N/A)	Majd al-Din Hawi (N/A)	Sonbol Sonbolian (Ind.)	Muhammad Saleh al-Mallah (Ind.)	Khaled Alabi (Ind.)	Hisham Khankan (N/A)
2007	Muhammad Shaban Azzouz (Ba'ath)	Muhammad Walid Ghazzal (Ba'ath)	Iman Babelly (Ba'ath)	Ramadan Hadleh (ASUP)	Jumana Radwan (SCP-B)	Abd al-Aziz al-Shami (Ind.)	Hilal Zayn al-Din (Ind.)	Ferya Siris (Ba'ath)	Suhail Farah (Ba'ath)	Muhammad Naji al-Otari (Ba'ath)	Adnan al-Sukhni (Ba'ath)	Abd al-Fattah Azzouz (SUP)	Ahmad Sajee (SCP-B)	Edward Makrabneh (Ind.)	Al Hassan Berri (Ind.)	Muhammad Dalil (Ind.)	Sonbol Sonbolian (Ind.)	Muhammad Saleh al-Mallah (Ind.)	Khaled Alabi (Ind.)	Abd al-Karim al-Sayyid (Ind.)
2007 by-election	Muhammad Shaban Azzouz (Ba'ath)	Muhammad Walid Ghazzal (Ba'ath)	Iman Babelly (Ba'ath)	Ramadan Hadleh (ASUP)	Jumana Radwan (SCP-B)	Muhammad Anas al-Shami (Ind.)	Alaa Zayn al-Din (Ind.)	Ferya Siris (Ba'ath)	Suhail Farah (Ba'ath)	Muhammad Naji al-Otari (Ba'ath)	Adnan al-Sukhni (Ba'ath)	Abd al-Fattah Azzouz (SUP)	Ahmad Sajee (SCP-B)	Edward Makrabneh (Ind.)	Al Hassan Berri (Ind.)	Muhammad Dalil (Ind.)	Sonbol Sonbolian (Ind.)	Muhammad Saleh al-Mallah (Ind.)	Khaled Alabi (Ind.)	Abd al-Karim al-Sayyid (Ind.)
2010 by-election	Muhammad Shaban Azzouz (Ba'ath)	Muhammad Walid Ghazzal (Ba'ath)	Iman Babelly (Ba'ath)	Ramadan Hadleh (ASUP)	Jumana Radwan (SCP-B)	Muhammad Anas al-Shami (Ind.)	Alaa Zayn al-Din (Ind.)	Ferya Siris (Ba'ath)	Suhail Farah (Ba'ath)	Muhammad Naji al-Otari (Ba'ath)	Muhammad Zaki Hakim (Ba'ath)	Thanaa Fakhr al-Din (ASUP)	Ahmad Sajee (SCP-B)	Edward Makrabneh (Ind.)	Al Hassan Berri (Ind.)	Muhammad Dalil (Ind.)	Sonbol Sonbolian (Ind.)	Muhammad Saleh al-Mallah (Ind.)	Khaled Alabi (Ind.)	Abd al-Karim al-Sayyid (Ind.)
2012	Kifah Lababidi (Ba'ath)	Muhammad Baha Badinjki (Ba'ath)	Iman Babelly (Ba'ath)	Muhammad Abbas Turkmani (Ba'ath)	Najla Hafez (Ba'ath)	Muhammad Anas al-Shami (Ind.)	Ahmed Jarikh (Ind.)	Bashar Yaziji (Ind.)	Maher Khayyata (Ind.)	Abdullah Qairouz (SSNP)	Jamal Hassani (Ba'ath)	Suhail Farah (Ba'ath)	Abdel Moneim al-Sawa (Ba'ath)	Omar Hallaq (Ba'ath)	Al Hassan Berri (Ind.)	Faisal Azouz (Ba'ath)	Muhammad Marwan Ulabi (Ba'ath)	Butros Murjana (Ind.)	Maher Hajjar (Ind.)	Muhammad Sahrij (Ind.)
2013 by-election	Kifah Lababidi (Ba'ath)	Muhammad Baha Badinjki (Ba'ath)	Iman Babelly (Ba'ath)	Muhammad Abbas Turkmani (Ba'ath)	Najla Hafez (Ba'ath)	Muhammad Anas al-Shami (Ind.)	Ahmed Jarikh (Ind.)	Bashar Yaziji (Ind.)	Maher Khayyata (Ind.)	Mustafa Abu Souf (SSNP)	Jamal Hassani (Ba'ath)	Suhail Farah (Ba'ath)	Abdel Moneim al-Sawa (Ba'ath)	Omar Hallaq (Ba'ath)	Al Hassan Berri (Ind.)	Faisal Azouz (Ba'ath)	Muhammad Marwan Ulabi (Ba'ath)	Butros Murjana (Ind.)	Maher Hajjar (Ind.)	Muhammad Sahrij (Ind.)
2015 by-election	Kifah Lababidi (Ba'ath)	Muhammad Baha Badinjki (Ba'ath)	Iman Babelly (Ba'ath)	Muhammad Abbas Turkmani (Ba'ath)	Najla Hafez (Ba'ath)	Muhammad Anas al-Shami (Ind.)	Ahmed Jarikh (Ind.)	Bashar Yaziji (Ind.)	Maher Khayyata (Ind.)	Mustafa Abu Souf (SSNP)	Jamal Hassani (Ba'ath)	Suhail Farah (Ba'ath)	Abdel Moneim al-Sawa (Ba'ath)	Omar Hallaq (Ba'ath)	Al Hassan Berri (Ind.)	Faisal Azouz (Ba'ath)	Muhammad Maher al-Muwaqqi (Ba'ath)	Butros Murjana (Ind.)	Maher Hajjar (Ind.)	Muhammad Sahrij (Ind.)
2016	Amira Stefano (Ba'ath)	Hussein Farhou (Ba'ath)	Muhammad Rabee Qalaaji (Ba'ath)	Muhannad al-Hajj Ali (Ba'ath)	Noha Janat (Ba'ath)	Hussam Qaterji (Ind.)	Salloum al-Salloum (Ba'ath)	Abd al-Majid al-Kawakibi (Ba'ath)	Maher Khayyata (Ind.)	Muhammad Jalal Darwish (Ba'ath)	Mustafa Saad Alabi (Ba'ath)	Maan Qanbour (Ba'ath)	Muhammad Yahya Kaadan (NCP)	Jirayr Ranisian (Ind.)	Al Hassan Berri (Ind.)	Zainab Khawla (Ind.)	Muhammad Maher al-Muwaqqi (Ba'ath)	Butros Murjana (Ind.)	Najdat Anzour (Ind.)	Fares al-Shihabi (Ind.)
2018 by-election	Amira Stefano (Ba'ath)	Hussein Farhou (Ba'ath)	Muhammad Rabee Qalaaji (Ba'ath)	Muhannad al-Hajj Ali (Ba'ath)	Noha Janat (Ba'ath)	Hussam Qaterji (Ind.)	Salloum al-Salloum (Ba'ath)	Muhammad Ammar Karman (Ba'ath)	Maher Khayyata (Ind.)	Muhammad Jalal Darwish (Ba'ath)	Mustafa Saad Alabi (Ba'ath)	Maan Qanbour (Ba'ath)	Muhammad Yahya Kaadan (NCP)	Jirayr Ranisian (Ind.)	Al Hassan Berri (Ind.)	Zainab Khawla (Ind.)	Muhammad Maher al-Muwaqqi (Ba'ath)	Butros Murjana (Ind.)	Najdat Anzour (Ind.)	Fares al-Shihabi (Ind.)
2020	Mariette Khoury (Ba'ath)	Lucy Iskanyan (Ba'ath)	Muhammad Rabee Qalaaji (Ba'ath)	Mazen Arslan (Ba'ath)	Muhammad al-Hasan (Ba'ath)	Hussam Qaterji (Ind.)	Salloum al-Salloum (Ba'ath)	Shadi Dibsi (Ind.)	Abdo Mousalli (Ba'ath)	Faisal Azzouz (Ba'ath)	Abd al-Munim al-Sawa (Ba'ath)	Maan Qanbour (Ba'ath)	Raafat Darmash (Ba'ath)	Jirayr Ranisian (Ind.)	Al Hassan Berri (Ind.)	Thanaa Fakhr al-Din (ASUP)	Muhammad Amer Hamwi (Ind.)	Butros Murjana (Ind.)	Najdat Anzour (Ind.)	Mahmoud Abu Bakr (Ind.)
2024	Mariette Khoury (Ba'ath)	Samer Hallaq (Ba'ath)	Abd al-Hamid Seirafi (Ba'ath)	Jamal Nasleh (Ba'ath)	Ghassan Sakit (Ba'ath)	Hassan Kaakeh (Ind.)	Salloum al-Salloum (Ba'ath)	Shadi Dibsi (Ind.)	Abdo Mousalli (Ba'ath)	Abd al-Munim al-Sawa (Ba'ath)	Ziad Tabbakh (Ba'ath)	Faisal Azzouz (Ba'ath)	Fatima Khalak (Ba'ath)	Ahmad Hadleh (ASUP)	Al Hassan Berri (Ind.)	Hussein Kharboutli (Ind.)	Muhammad Amer Hamwi (Ind.)	Ziad Muhammad al-Hariri (Ind.)	Maria Manouk (Ind.)	Maher Hajjar (Ind.)
2024 by-election	Mariette Khoury (Ba'ath)	Samer Hallaq (Ba'ath)	Abd al-Hamid Seirafi (Ba'ath)	Jamal Nasleh (Ba'ath)	Ghassan Sakit (Ba'ath)	Hassan Kaakeh (Ind.)	Salloum al-Salloum (Ba'ath)	Vacant (Note: By-elections were cancelled. See 2024 by-election.)	Abdo Mousalli (Ba'ath)	Abd al-Munim al-Sawa (Ba'ath)	Ziad Tabbakh (Ba'ath)	Faisal Azzouz (Ba'ath)	Fatima Khalak (Ba'ath)	Ahmad Hadleh (ASUP)	Al Hassan Berri (Ind.)	Hussein Kharboutli (Ind.)	Muhammad Amer Hamwi (Ind.)	Ziad Muhammad al-Hariri (Ind.)	Maria Manouk (Ind.)	Maher Hajjar (Ind.)
