= Daraa (former People's Assembly electoral district) =

Former electoral district of Syria's national legislature

- Former electoral district for the People's Assembly
- Location of Daraa within Syria
- Governorate: Daraa
- Population: 1,027,000 (2011)
- Area: 3,730 km^{2}

Former electoral district
- Created: 1973
- Abolished: 2025
- Seats: List: 10 (1990–2025); 8 (1977–1990); 7 (1973–1977)
- Created from: List: Daraa; Izraa
- Replaced by: List: As-Sanamayn; Daraa; Izraa

Daraa (Arabic: درعا) was an electoral district used to elect members of the Syrian People's Assembly between 1973 and 2025.

== Electoral system ==
The electoral system used to elect the People's Assembly was introduced in 1973 and remained in use until the assembly's dissolution in 2025. Each governorate formed a single, large electoral district, except for Aleppo Governorate, which was divided into two districts: the city of Aleppo and the rural districts of Aleppo Governorate. Within each district, seats were awarded on a block-vote basis, with the candidates receiving the largest number of votes taking all of the seats allocated to it, and the assembly was composed of representatives of two sectors, "workers and peasants" and "other sectors of the people", with the former guaranteed at least half of its seats nationally. The number of seats, and their distribution among districts, was left to the president of the republic to set by decree rather than being fixed in law; the total was raised from 186 to 195 in 1981 and from 195 to 250 in 1990, after which the distribution among the fifteen electoral districts was not changed.

All Syrian citizens aged 18 and over were entitled to vote, other than those under legal guardianship, those with a mental illness affecting their legal capacity, and those convicted of a felony or a "dishonourable" misdemeanour, while serving members of the armed forces and police were barred from voting and from standing as candidates; candidates were further required to be at least 25 years old and to have held Syrian nationality for at least five years, a period raised to ten under the 2011 and 2014 electoral laws. During the 2011 reform of the electoral law, the replacement of this system was discussed because of its weak representativeness, but the large-district, block-vote system was retained; the reform instead moved the administration of elections from the Ministry of Interior and provincial governors to an independent Supreme Judicial Committee for Elections, a structure carried over into a further law passed in 2014 that consolidated the rules for presidential, parliamentary and local-council elections into a single statute.

Beyond being considered unrepresentative — a majoritarian, large-district system of a kind rejected by most electoral systems worldwide — the system has also been criticised for the unevenness of its distribution of seats between governorates. Based on the number of registered voters at the 2012 election, the average was around 59,000 voters per seat nationally, but the ratio varied considerably: about 37,800 voters per seat in Damascus and 51,500 in Tartus, compared with 71,700 in Al-Hasakah and 69,500 in the rural districts of Aleppo Governorate, with no mechanism beyond a presidential decree governing the size of constituencies or the allocation of seats between them.

== Members ==
Elections	MPA (Party)	MPA (Party)	MPA (Party)	MPA (Party)	MPA (Party)	MPA (Party)	MPA (Party)	MPA (Party)	MPA (Party)	MPA (Party)
1973	Ibrahim al-Ali (N/A)	Mahmoud Abu Rumiya al-Saadi (N/A)	Shafiq Wahdan (N/A)	Muhammad al-Rashid Abazaid (N/A)	Said Suleiman (N/A)	Youssef al-Shuli (N/A)	Ahmad al-Muhamid (N/A)	7 seats		
1977	Shahira Fallouh (N/A)	Mahmoud Abu Rumiya al-Saadi (N/A)	Shafiq Wahdan (N/A)	Muhammad al-Rashid Abazaid (N/A)	Said Suleiman (N/A)	Ibrahim al-Zoubi (N/A)	Muhammad Said Twaisan (N/A)	Naif al-Taani (N/A)	8 seats	
1981	Dheeb al-Hariri (N/A)	Awda al-Qassis (N/A)	Muhammad Oqab Mahmoud (N/A)	Youssef al-Jabawi (N/A)	Mahmoud al-Zoubi (Ba'ath)	Ahmad al-Masalmeh (N/A)	Muhammad Zabout (N/A)	Youssef Mahamid (N/A)	8 seats	
1986	Dheeb al-Hariri (N/A)	Awda al-Qassis (N/A)	Mahmoud al-Nabulsi (N/A)	Youssef al-Khalil (N/A)	Mahmoud al-Zoubi (Ba'ath)	Fawziya al-Qatifan (N/A)	Muhammad Zabout (N/A)	Ahmad al-Masalmeh (N/A)	8 seats	
1990	Dheeb al-Hariri (N/A)	Awda al-Qassis (N/A)	Najah Mahamid (N/A)	Youssef Abu Rumiya al-Saadi (Ind.)	Mahmoud al-Zoubi (Ba'ath)	Abd al-Fattah al-Ibrahim (N/A)	Abd al-Fattah al-Labbad (N/A)	Muhammad Oqab (N/A)	Ghassan Aba Zaid (N/A)	Shafiq al-Hariri (N/A)
1991 by-election	Ibrahim al-Issa (N/A)	Awda al-Qassis (N/A)	Najah Mahamid (N/A)	Youssef Abu Rumiya al-Saadi (Ind.)	Mahmoud al-Zoubi (Ba'ath)	Abd al-Fattah al-Ibrahim (N/A)	Abd al-Fattah al-Labbad (N/A)	Muhammad Oqab (N/A)	Ghassan Aba Zaid (N/A)	Shafiq al-Hariri (N/A)
1994 by-election	Ibrahim al-Issa (N/A)	Awda al-Qassis (N/A)	Najah Mahamid (N/A)	Youssef Abu Rumiya al-Saadi (Ind.)	Mahmoud al-Zoubi (Ba'ath)	Abd al-Fattah al-Ibrahim (N/A)	Abd al-Fattah al-Labbad (N/A)	Qassem al-Rabdawi (N/A)	Ghassan Aba Zaid (N/A)	Shafiq al-Hariri (N/A)
1994	Ali Abd al-Karim (N/A)	Awda al-Qassis (N/A)	Najah Mahamid (N/A)	Youssef Abu Rumiya al-Saadi (Ind.)	Mahmoud al-Zoubi (Ba'ath)	Farouq al-Hamadi (N/A)	Ahmad Bahjat al-Hariri (N/A)	Muhammad Jamil Muharib (N/A)	Nabil al-Miqdad (N/A)	Farouq al-Dukhan (N/A)
1998	Muhammad Jamil Muharib (N/A)	Awda al-Qassis (N/A)	Abdallah al-Zoubi (N/A)	Youssef Abu Rumiya al-Saadi (Ind.)	Moussa al-Karoud (N/A)	Ali Batha (N/A)	Hussein al-Rifai (N/A)	Hasna Awad (N/A)	Naser al-Hariri (Ind.)	Khalaf al-Ali (N/A)
2003	Ibtisam al-Samadi (N/A)	Ali Arafat (Ba'ath)	Khaled al-Abboud (SUP)	Farid al-Akka (N/A)	Muhammad al-Harib (N/A)	Farouq al-Hamadi (N/A)	Naif Abazid (N/A)	Moussa al-Zoubi (N/A)	Qassem Idris (N/A)	Khalil al-Rifaei (Ind.)
2007	Mahmoud Khair al-Zoubi (Ba'ath)	Ali Arafat (Ba'ath)	Khaled al-Abboud (SUP)	Youssef Abu Rumiya al-Saadi (Ind.)	Ahmad al-Miqdad (Ba'ath)	Fawaz al-Mahamid (Ba'ath)	Raida al-Ghanem (Ba'ath)	Abdallah al-Nasrallah (Ind.)	Naser al-Hariri (Ind.)	Khalil al-Rifaei (Ind.)
2012	Waleed al-Zoubi (SCP-U)	Mahmoud al-Hariri (Ba'ath)	Wafaa al-Awda (Ba'ath)	Waleed al-Saleh (Ba'ath)	Taiseer al-Jegheini (Ind.)	Shukria Mahameed (Ba'ath)	Fawaz al-Sharaa (Ba'ath)	Faisal al-Khoury (Ba'ath)	Nidal al-Fateh (Ba'ath)	Muhammad al-Khabi (Ind.)
2015 by-election	Waleed al-Zoubi (SCP-U)	Mahmoud al-Hariri (Ba'ath)	Wafaa al-Awda (Ba'ath)	Waleed al-Saleh (Ba'ath)	Ali al-Ghazali (Ind.)	Shukria Mahameed (Ba'ath)	Fawaz al-Sharaa (Ba'ath)	Faisal al-Khoury (Ba'ath)	Nidal al-Fateh (Ba'ath)	Muhammad al-Khabi (Ind.)
2016	Jamal al-Zoubi (Ba'ath)	Fawaz al-Jawabrah (Ba'ath)	Khaled al-Abboud (SUP)	Kamal al-Ayyash (Ba'ath)	Naif al-Hariri (Ba'ath)	Farouq al-Hamadi (Ind.)	Fawaz al-Sharaa (Ba'ath)	Faisal al-Khoury (Ba'ath)	Faiza al-Adhba (Ba'ath)	Riyadh Shatiwi (Ind.)
2020	Ahmad al-Suwaidan (Ba'ath)	Walid al-Salih (Ba'ath)	Khaled al-Abboud (SUP)	Manaf al-Fallah (Ba'ath)	Shukri al-Jundi (Ba'ath)	Farouq al-Hamadi (Ind.)	Mufleh al-Nasrallah (Ba'ath)	Abdul-Nasser al-Hariri (Ba'ath)	Faiza al-Adhba (Ba'ath)	Yahya al-Mafaalani (Ind.)
2024	Ahmad al-Suwaidan (Ba'ath)	Ahmad al-Jamous (Ba'ath)	Mahrez al-Nasrallah (SSNP)	Manaf al-Fallah (Ba'ath)	Shukri al-Jundi (Ba'ath)	Farouq al-Hamadi (Ind.)	Yaseen al-Zamel (Ba'ath)	Abdul-Nasser al-Hariri (Ba'ath)	Faiza al-Adhba (Ba'ath)	Yahya al-Mafaalani (Ind.)
