= Mohammad Fayez al-Barasha =

Syrian politician

HE Mohammad Fayez al-Barasha محمد فايز البراشا

Minister of State for Investment Affairs and Vital Projects
- In office 30 August 2020 – 29 March 2023
- President: Bashar al-Assad
- Prime Minister: Hussein Arnous
- Preceded by: Himself
- Succeeded by: Ahmed Bustaji

Personal details
- Born: 1955 (age 70–71) Damascus, Damascus Governorate, Second Syrian Republic
- Party: Syrian Communist Party
- Children: 2
- Profession: Politician, Civil servant

Mohammad Fayez al-Barasha (born 1955) is a Syrian politician from the Syrian Communist Party. Since 2021, he has served in the Second Hussein Arnous government as Minister of State for Investment Affairs and Vital Projects.

== Personal life ==
He is married with two children.
