= Lucy Iskanyan =

Syrian politician

Lucy Iskanyan is a Syrian politician who has been a member of the Syrian Parliament since the 2020 election. She is an Armenian Christian and a member of the Ba'ath Party.

== Political career ==
In Parliament, she chairs the Syria-Armenia Friendship Group.

In April 2022, during a meeting of the Syria-Armenian Friendship Group, she proposed to upgrade the agreement between the two countries, in particular, on the issue of mutually granting student scholarships. She also claimed that despite the challenges caused by the ongoing war, scientific and educational institutions operating in Syria never stopped their activities.

== See also ==
- List of members of the Parliament of Syria, 2020-2024
