= Naher Aisha =

- Interactive map of Naher Aisha
- Country: Syria
- Governorate: Damascus Governorate
- City: Damascus

Naher Aisha is a neighborhood in Damascus, Syria.
