= Hossam Katerji =

Syrian businessman and Member of Parliament

- حسام القاطرجي

Member of People's Assembly of Syria
- In office 6 June 2016 – 21 August 2024
- Constituency: Aleppo

Personal details
- Born: 11 January 1982 (age 44) Raqqa, Syria
- Citizenship: Syria
- Relations: Mohammed Baraa Katerji (brother)
- Known for: CEO of Katerji Group (a.k.a. al-Qatirji Company/Qatirji Company/ Khatirji Group/Katerji International Group
- Nickname(s): Hussam Katerji, Hossam Ahmed, Mohammed Katerji, Muhammad Katerji

Hossam al-Katerji (Arabic: حسام القاطرجي, born 11 January 1982), also known as Hossam Katerji, is a Syrian businessman and former member of the People's Assembly of Syria, Syria's parliament.

== Career ==
Katerji is the proprietor of Katerji Group and involved in the petroleum industry in Syria. He was first elected at the 2016 Syrian parliamentary election and later reelected at the 2020 Syrian parliamentary election. He is sanctioned by the European Union in 2019 for his links to the Assad regime, as he "supports and benefits from the regime through enabling, and profiting from, trade deals with the regime in relation to oil and wheat."

Katerji has been described as a member of a new class of brokers that has arisen during the Syrian Civil War that move goods between areas held by the Syrian regime, rebels, and ISIL.

== Personal life ==
In October 2023, Katerji fled Syria following the death of a relative, after which the office of First Lady Asma al-Assad reportedly moved to confiscate his assets.

His elder brother, Mohammed Baraa, was assassinated by an Israeli airstrike near the Syrian Lebanese border in July 2024.
