= Suwayda (former People's Assembly electoral district) =

Former electoral district of Syria's national legislature

- Former electoral district for the People's Assembly
- Location of Suwayda within Syria
- Governorate: Suwayda
- Population: 375,000 (2010)
- Area: 5,550 km^{2}

Former electoral district
- Created: 1973
- Abolished: 2025
- Seats: List: 6 (1990–2025); 5 (1973–1990)
- Created from: List: Salkhad; Shahba; Suwayda
- Replaced by: List: Salkhad; Shahba; Suwayda

Suwayda (Arabic: السويداء) was an electoral district used to elect members of the Syrian People's Assembly between 1973 and 2025.

== Electoral system ==
The electoral system used to elect the People's Assembly was introduced in 1973 and remained in use until the assembly's dissolution in 2025. Each governorate formed a single, large electoral district, except for Aleppo Governorate, which was divided into two districts: the city of Aleppo and the rural districts of Aleppo Governorate. Within each district, seats were awarded on a block-vote basis, with the candidates receiving the largest number of votes taking all of the seats allocated to it, and the assembly was composed of representatives of two sectors, "workers and peasants" and "other sectors of the people", with the former guaranteed at least half of its seats nationally. The number of seats, and their distribution among districts, was left to the president of the republic to set by decree rather than being fixed in law; the total was raised from 186 to 195 in 1981 and from 195 to 250 in 1990, after which the distribution among the fifteen electoral districts was not changed.

All Syrian citizens aged 18 and over were entitled to vote, other than those under legal guardianship, those with a mental illness affecting their legal capacity, and those convicted of a felony or a "dishonourable" misdemeanour, while serving members of the armed forces and police were barred from voting and from standing as candidates; candidates were further required to be at least 25 years old and to have held Syrian nationality for at least five years, a period raised to ten under the 2011 and 2014 electoral laws. During the 2011 reform of the electoral law, the replacement of this system was discussed because of its weak representativeness, but the large-district, block-vote system was retained; the reform instead moved the administration of elections from the Ministry of Interior and provincial governors to an independent Supreme Judicial Committee for Elections, a structure carried over into a further law passed in 2014 that consolidated the rules for presidential, parliamentary and local-council elections into a single statute.

Beyond being considered unrepresentative — a majoritarian, large-district system of a kind rejected by most electoral systems worldwide — the system has also been criticised for the unevenness of its distribution of seats between governorates. Based on the number of registered voters at the 2012 election, the average was around 59,000 voters per seat nationally, but the ratio varied considerably: about 37,800 voters per seat in Damascus and 51,500 in Tartus, compared with 71,700 in Al-Hasakah and 69,500 in the rural districts of Aleppo Governorate, with no mechanism beyond a presidential decree governing the size of constituencies or the allocation of seats between them.

== Members ==
Elections	MPA (Party)	MPA (Party)	MPA (Party)	MPA (Party)	MPA (Party)	MPA (Party)
1973	Jamil Gharz al-Din (N/A)	Nayef al-Halabi (N/A)	Jamal Heneidi (N/A)	Hussein Abu Assaf (N/A)	Moudha al-Mulhim (N/A)	5 sesats
1977	Shibli Nasr (N/A)	Nayef al-Halabi (N/A)	Jamal Abd al-Din (N/A)	Turki Shalhoub (N/A)	Asaad Harb (N/A)	5 sesats
1980 by-election	Shibli Nasr (N/A)	Nayef al-Halabi (N/A)	Jamal Abd al-Din (N/A)	Said al-Salman (N/A)	Asaad Harb (N/A)	5 sesats
1981	Assad Masoud (N/A)	Turki al-Qintar (N/A)	Fendi al-Atrash (N/A)	Adel Abu Asali (N/A)	Fadlallah Nasser al-Din (N/A)	5 sesats
1986	Salam al-Yassin (N/A)	Sharif Hudayfa (N/A)	Fendi al-Atrash (N/A)	Yahya Amer (N/A)	Hassan Jarbu (N/A)	5 sesats
1990	Salam al-Yassin (N/A)	Muhanna al-Tawil (N/A)	Muayyad Subh (N/A)	Kamal Amer (Ind.)	Hassan Jarbu (N/A)	Abdallah al-Atrash (Ind.)
1994	Ghazi Nawfal (N/A)	Jamil al-Faqih (N/A)	Ahmad al-Zughair (N/A)	Kamal Amer (Ind.)	Rashrash Falahout (N/A)	Abdallah al-Atrash (Ind.)
1995 by-election	Ghazi Nawfal (N/A)	Kamal Ballan (N/A)	Ahmad al-Zughair (N/A)	Kamal Amer (Ind.)	Rashrash Falahout (N/A)	Abdallah al-Atrash (Ind.)
1998	Sabir Falhout (Ba'ath)	Kamal Ballan (N/A)	Shibli Jnoun (N/A)	Kamal Amer (Ind.)	Hani al-Hajjar (N/A)	Abdallah al-Atrash (Ind.)
2003	Sabir Falhout (Ba'ath)	Hamad Abu Tafesh (N/A)	Hassan Azzam (N/A)	Kamal Amer (Ind.)	Hanan Amro (N/A)	Abdallah al-Atrash (Ind.)
2007	Siham al-Jabr Abu Fakhr (Ba'ath)	Sameer Hassoun (Ba'ath)	Fares Abd al-Din (Ba'ath)	Kamal Amer (Ind.)	Mufid Abu Hamdan (Ba'ath)	Abdallah al-Atrash (Ind.)
2012	Arkan al-Shoufi (Ba'ath)	Hammoud Khair (Ba'ath)	Shamikh Salha (Ba'ath)	Yahya Amer (Ba'ath)	Walid Abu Asali (Ba'ath)	Arkan Nasr (Ind.)
2016	Aida Arij (Ba'ath)	Issam Naim (Ba'ath)	Mouaad Nasser (Ba'ath)	Nashaat al-Atrash (Ind.)	Nidal al-Shariti (Ba'ath)	Naim Nassr (Ind.)
2020	Khaled Karbaj (Ba'ath)	Majd Abu Zaidan (Ba'ath)	Nasib Abu Mahmoud (Ba'ath)	Nashaat al-Atrash (Ind.)	Hikmat Salam (Ba'ath)	Mueen Nasr (Ind.)
2024	Khaled Karbaj (Ba'ath)	Nidal al-Ali (Ba'ath)	Waseem Ezz al-Din (Ba'ath)	Nashaat al-Atrash (Ind.)	Hekmat Abu Ghazi (Ba'ath)	Mueen Nasr (Ind.)
