= Ibtisam al-Samadi =

- ابتسام الصمادي
- Born: 1955 (age 70–71); Jasim, Daraa, Syria
- Occupations: Poet, academic, and literary salon-holder

Ibtisam Ismai'l al-Samadi (born 1955) is a Syrian poet and academic. She studied elementary and middle school in Beirut, then moved back to Syria to complete her studies. After graduating from Damascus University with a degree in English, she returned to Beirut for postgraduate studies. She started writing at a young age and is one of the academies at Damascus University in the Department of Arts and English. She became involved in politics and became a member of the Syrian People's Assembly. Her poetry books are printed and she is the owner of Tuesday (Al-Thulatha') Cultural Salon.

== Early life ==
Ibtissam Al Samadi was born in Jasim, Daraa Governorate, Syria to a Syrian father and a Lebanese mother.

== Works ==
Printed poetry collections including:

- Ambassador Extraordinary: 1990.
- She and me and other affairs: 1995.
- Diamond grains
- Diamond for him: 2002.
- Full Jasmine 2005.
- Sense of Sham: 2017.
- The Nile is like her: a collection of unprinted articles.
- Come Fly Range: Her poetry collection for children.
