= Walid Ikhlasi =

Syrian dramatist, novelist, and short stories writer (1935–2022)

- وليد إخلاصي
- Born: 27 May 1935; İskenderun, French Syria
- Died: 19 February 2022 (aged 86); Aleppo, Syria
- Other names: Walīd Ikhlāṣī, Waleed Ekhlassi
- Occupation: Writer

Walid Ikhlasi (Arabic: وليد إخلاصي; 27 May 1935 – 19 February 2022) was a Syrian novelist, short story writer and playwright.

== Life and career ==
Born in İskenderun, after getting a degree as an agricultural engineer, Ikhlasi started his career as a writer of short stories in 1954. In 1963, he published Qissas ("Stories"), his first collection of stories, and two years later, he debuted as a novelist with Shita al-bahr al-yabis.

Also an avantgarde playwright, his style is characterized by an experimental, surrealistic, and absurdist vein, often mixed with an extreme realistic tone. Among his major themes, is his longing for democracy and freedom.

Besides his literary activity, Ikhlasi served as a lecturer at the University of Aleppo. He died in Aleppo on 19 February 2022, at the age of 86.
