= Naser al-Hariri =

Syrian lawyer and politician (born 1955)

- ناصر الحريري

Member of the People's Assembly
- Incumbent
- Assumed office 1 July 2026
- Appointed by: Ahmed al-Sharaa
- In office 7 May 2007 – 23 April 2011
- Constituency: Daraa Governorate
- In office 17 December 1998 – 16 December 2002
- Constituency: Daraa Governorate

Personal details
- Born: Nasser Muhammad Khair al-Hariri; 1955 (age 70–71) Ash-Shaykh Miskin, Syria
- Party: Independent
- Education: Damascus University (LLB)

Nasser Muhammad Khair al-Hariri (Arabic: ناصر محمد خير الحريري; born 1955) is a Syrian lawyer, tribal leader, and politician who has served as a member of the People's Assembly since 2026. He became known during the early stages of the Syrian uprising in 2011 after publicly accusing the Syrian security forces of responsibility for the violence in Daraa Governorate.

== Early life and education ==
Al-Hariri was born in 1955 in the town of Ash-Shaykh Miskin, Daraa Governorate, Syria. He studied law at the University of Damascus.

== Political career ==
Al-Hariri was first elected to the People's Assembly of Syria in 1988.

During the early months of the Syrian uprising, he gave a telephone interview to BBC Arabic in which he held the Syrian security forces fully responsible for the killings taking place in Daraa Governorate. He also addressed a public message to President Bashar al-Assad, urging him to intervene personally.

On 23 April 2011, al-Hariri announced his resignation from the People's Assembly on Al Jazeera in protest against the government's handling of the unrest.

Fellow People's Assembly member Khalil al-Rifaei also announced his defection on the same day, making al-Hariri the first parliamentarian to defect during the Syrian uprising.

== Exile ==
Al-Hariri left Syria on in August 2012 after escaping house arrest and crossing into Jordan with the assistance of the Free Syrian Army. After arriving in Jordan, he participated in the establishment of the Free National Gathering of Workers in Syrian State Institutions on 15 December 2012.

== Later career ==
Following the fall of the Assad government on 8 December 2024, al-Hariri became a member of the People's Assembly of Syria as part of the presidential list announced on 1 July 2026.
