= Zainab Khawla =

Syrian politician

Zainab Khawla (born 23 December 1969) is a Syrian politician. She is an Independent member of the Syrian Parliament representing Aleppo.
