= Ammar Bakdash =

Syrian politician (1954–2025)

- عمار بكداش

Secretary-General of the Syrian Communist Party (Bakdash)
- In office 2010–2025

Personal details
- Born: Ammar Khaled Bakdash; 16 August 1954 Damascus, Syria
- Died: 12 July 2025 (aged 70) Athens, Greece
- Party: Syrian Communist Party (Bakdash)
- Parent(s): Khalid Bakdash; Wisal Bakdash
- Education: Plekhanov Moscow Institute for National Economy; Moscow State University
- Profession: Economist, politician

Ammar Khaled Bakdash (Arabic: عمار خالد بكداش; 16 August 1954 – 12 July 2025) was a Syrian politician and economist, who served as Secretary-General of the Syrian Communist Party (Bakdash) from 2010 until the party was banned in 2025, following the fall of the Assad regime.

== Life and career ==
Bakdash was born in Damascus to Khalid Bakdash, the founder and long-time Secretary-General of the Syrian Communist Party, and Wisal Bakdash, who would succeed her husband as Secretary-General. Ammar Bakdash himself joined the Syrian Communist Party in 1969, before leaving Syria to study in Moscow; he obtained a master's degree in economic planning from the Plekhanov Moscow Institute for National Economy, and received a doctorate in economic sciences from Moscow State University in 1983.

Bakdash was elected a member of the Central Committee of the Syrian Communist Party (Bakdash) in 1990, of the Politburo in 1992 and of the Central Secretariat in 1993. He was a deputy of the People's Assembly, the Syrian parliament, from 2003 until June 2024, where he served as chairman of the Financial Laws Committee between 2016 and 2020.

In 2010 Bakdash was elected Secretary-General of the party, and served as such until the party was banned under Ahmed al-Sharaa in January 2025, following the fall of the Assad regime. With help from the Communist Party of Greece, Bakdash subsequently fled Syria for Greece. He died of a heart attack in Athens in July 2025, at the age of 70, and was buried at Kaisariani Municipal Cemetery eulogised by Dimitris Koutsoumpas, the General Secretary of the Central Committee of the Communist Party of Greece, and Ilias Stamelos, the communist Mayor of Kaisariani.
