= Syrian Communist Party (Bakdash) =

Banned political party in Syria

Syrian Communist Party الحزب الشيوعي السوري
- Abbreviation: SCP(B)
- Leader: Ammar Bakdash
- Founded: July 15, 1986; 40 years ago
- Banned: January 29, 2025; 20 months ago
- Split from: Syrian Communist Party
- Headquarters: Damascus, Syria
- Youth wing: Union of Democratic Youth of Syria-Khaled Baghdash
- Ideology: Communism; Marxism–Leninism; Anti-revisionism
- Political position: Far-left
- National affiliation: National Progressive Front (until 2025)
- International affiliation: IMCWP
- Colours: Red and yellow
- Slogan: A free homeland and a happy people

Party flag

Website
- syriancp.org (archive)

The Syrian Communist Party (Arabic: الحزب الشيوعي السوري, romanized: Al-Hizb Ash-Shuyū'ī As-Sūrī) is a banned Marxist-Leninist party in Syria. It is anti-revisionist in its orientation.

It emerged from a split from the original Syrian Communist Party and originated from the anti-revisionist and anti-Perestroika faction of the latter.

The party supported the Assad government and was consequently banned by the transitional government after the Assad government's fall.

== History ==
The party emerged from a split in the Syrian Communist Party in 1986, as formed by the anti-Perestroika faction led by Khalid Bakdash. Khalid Bakdash died in 1995 and was succeeded as secretary of his party faction by his widow, Wisal Farha Bakdash. At the time of the Damascus Spring in 2000, the party was able to publish a newspaper called Sawt al-Shaab ("Voice of the People"). The party also suffered another rift that year, leading to the formation of the People's Will Party led by Qadri Jamil.

The party's last secretary general was Ammar Bakdash, who succeeded his mother in the party's leadership.

Until 29 March 2023, Mohammad Fayez al-Barasha was the party's only cabinet minister.

Following the fall of the Assad regime, the party was banned by the Syrian transitional government due to its support for the Assad Government. The ban was condemned by the Iraqi Communist Party and the Communist Party of Kurdistan – Iraq.

Ammar Bakdash died in Greece in July 2025. The Party afterwards sent a letter thanking the Communist Party of Greece for hospitality to Ammar Bakdash during his stay.

== Leaders ==
- Khalid Bakdash (1986–1995)
- Wisal Bakdash (1995–2010)
- Ammar Bakdash (2010–2025)

== Election results ==
=== Syrian People's Assembly elections ===
Election	Seats	+/–
2007	5 / 250	New
2012	8 / 250	▲3
2016	3 / 250	▼5
2020	3 / 250	0
2024	2 / 250	▼1
