= 2016 Syrian parliamentary election =

- 13 April 2016

All 250 seats in the Parliament of Syria 126 seats needed for a majority
- Registered: 8,834,994
- Turnout: 57.56% (▲6.30pp)
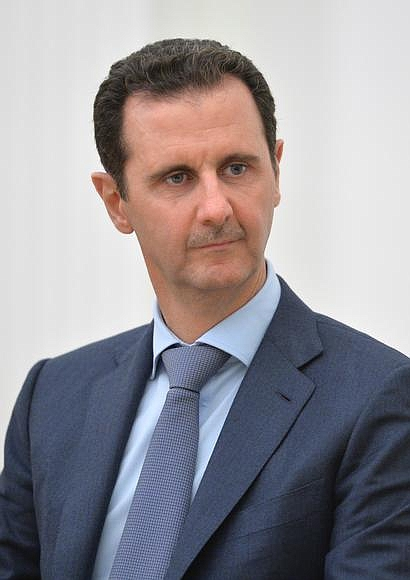
	First party	Second party
		Ind
Leader	Bashar al-Assad	Independent politicians
Party	Ba'ath Party	Independent
Alliance	NPF
Last election	168	77
Seats won	200	50
Seat change	▲32	▼27
- Seat distribution by party
Speaker before election
Mohammad Jihad al-Laham
Ba'ath Party
Elected Speaker
Hadiya Abbas
Ba'ath Party

Parliamentary elections were held in Syria to elect the People's Assembly on 13 April 2016, electing members for the 2016–2020 parliamentary term.

== Background ==
Amidst nearly five years of civil war and ensuing negotiations for a ceasefire, following the Russian military intervention in the Syrian Civil War and Syrian Arab Army gains, President Bashar al-Assad called the election.

At the time of the election, Idlib Governorate was almost entirely outside government control, as it was controlled by rebels. Raqqa Governorate and Deir ez-Zor Governorate were mostly occupied by ISIL. As such, elections did not take place in these provinces. Parts of Aleppo, Homs, and Daraa governorates were also held by anti-government forces at the time of the election. Rojava had also been semi-autonomous since the civil war began.

== Electoral system ==
All 250 members of the People's Assembly were elected from 15 multi-member constituencies in general tickets.

Constituency	Seats	Population (est. 2011)
Damascus Governorate	29	1,754,000
Rif Dimashq Governorate	19	2,836,000
Aleppo (city)	20	2,132,100
Aleppo Governorate	32	2,735,900
Homs Governorate	23	1,803,000
Hama Governorate	22	1,628,000
Latakia Governorate	17	1,008,000
Idlib Governorate	18	1,501,000
Tartus Governorate	13	797,000
Raqqa Governorate	8	944,000
Deir ez-Zor Governorate	14	1,239,000
Al-Hasakah Governorate	14	1,512,000
Daraa Governorate	10	1,027,000
As-Suwayda Governorate	6	370,000
Quneitra Governorate	5	90,000
Total	250	21,377,000

== Results ==
The Ba'ath Party-led National Progressive Front won 200 of the 250 seats, while the opposition inside and outside the country boycotted the elections; voter turnout was 57.56%. Two Armenians were elected to the People's Assembly.

Party or alliance		Votes	%	Seats
National Progressive Front	Ba'ath Party			172
National Progressive Front	Syrian Social Nationalist Party			7
National Progressive Front	Syrian Communist Party (Bakdash)			3
National Progressive Front	Socialist Unionist Party			2
National Progressive Front	Arab Socialist Union Party			2
National Progressive Front	Syrian Communist Party (Faisal)			1
National Progressive Front	National Covenant Party			1
National Progressive Front	NPF-affiliated independents			12
Independents				50
Total				250
Total votes		5,085,444	–	
Registered voters/turnout		8,834,994	57.56	
Source: IPU

== Reactions ==
- Germany – Martin Schaefer, spokesman for the Foreign Ministry has announced that Germany would not accept the results of the election. He stated that "holding free and fair elections is simply impossible in the current situation, with all the refugees, in a full civil war situation."
- United States – John Kirby, spokesman for the United States Department of State has announced that the United States believes the elections to not be credible, fair or free. He cited the departure of many citizens as a result of the Syrian Civil War.
