= 2020 Syrian parliamentary election =

- 19 July 2020

All 250 seats in the Parliament of Syria 126 seats needed for a majority
- Registered: 18,766,014
- Turnout: 33.17% (▼24.39pp)
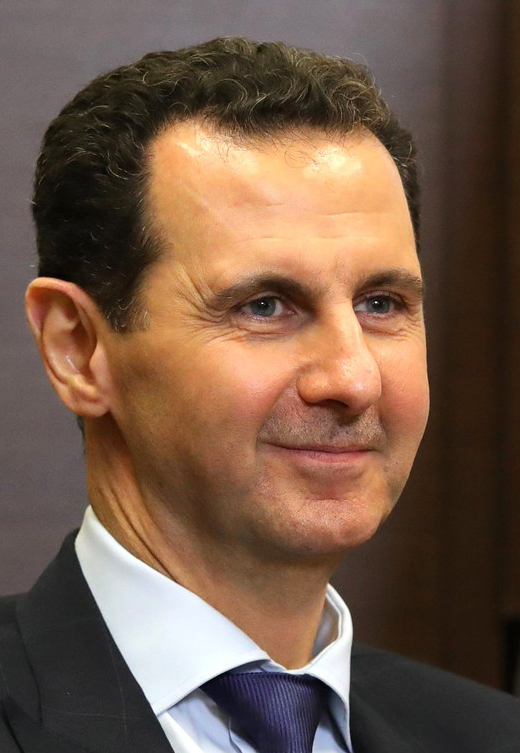
	First party	Second party
		IND
Leader	Bashar al-Assad	Independent politicians
Party	Ba'ath Party	Independent
Alliance	NPF
Last election	200	50
Seats won	183	67
Seat change	▼17	▲17
- Seat distribution by party
Speaker before election
Hammouda Sabbagh
Ba'ath Party
Elected Speaker
Hammouda Sabbagh
Ba'ath Party

Parliamentary elections were scheduled to be held in Syria on 13 April 2020 to elect members of the People's Council of Syria. However, on 14 March they were postponed to 20 May due to the coronavirus pandemic. On 7 May it was decided to postpone the elections until 19 July. Syria's parliamentary elections occur every four years, with the last held in 2016.

A total of 1,656 candidates ran for office, competing for all 250 seats in Syria's parliament.

== Background ==
The previous parliamentary election was held on 13 April 2016, although its results were not recognized by the United Nations. On 3 March 2020, President Bashar al-Assad issued a decree setting the date of the election to 13 April 2020. The decree stipulated that 127 of the 250 members of the People's Council were to be workers and farmers, while 123 were to be from other segments of the population. All were to be elected from 15 multi-member constituencies. The announcement came amid a government offensive on Idlib Governorate, the last province mainly controlled by the Syrian opposition. The opposition Syrian National Coalition called the election a "theatrical election by the Assad regime" with millions uprooted or in exile.

In the months leading up to the election, there were heavy disputes within the Syrian government, as President Assad quarreled with the influential Maklouf family. Accordingly, pro-Assad factions attempted to weaken Maklouf allies, including the Syrian Social Nationalist Party (SSNP). The SSNP had previously acted as a kind of opposition within the government and was regarded as the country's most powerful party after the Ba'ath Party. Besides the Ba'ath Party and the SSNP, the Syrian Communist Party (Bakdash) was considered as a runner-up, as it had substantial grassroots support. In addition, several candidates in the election were affiliated with or leaders of militias involved in the civil war, including Baqir Brigade, ex-Ba'ath Brigades, Hezbollah, and tribal militias. One candidate was Madloul Omar al-Aziz, an ex-al-Nusra Front member who had defected to the government in course of the civil war.

== Electoral system ==
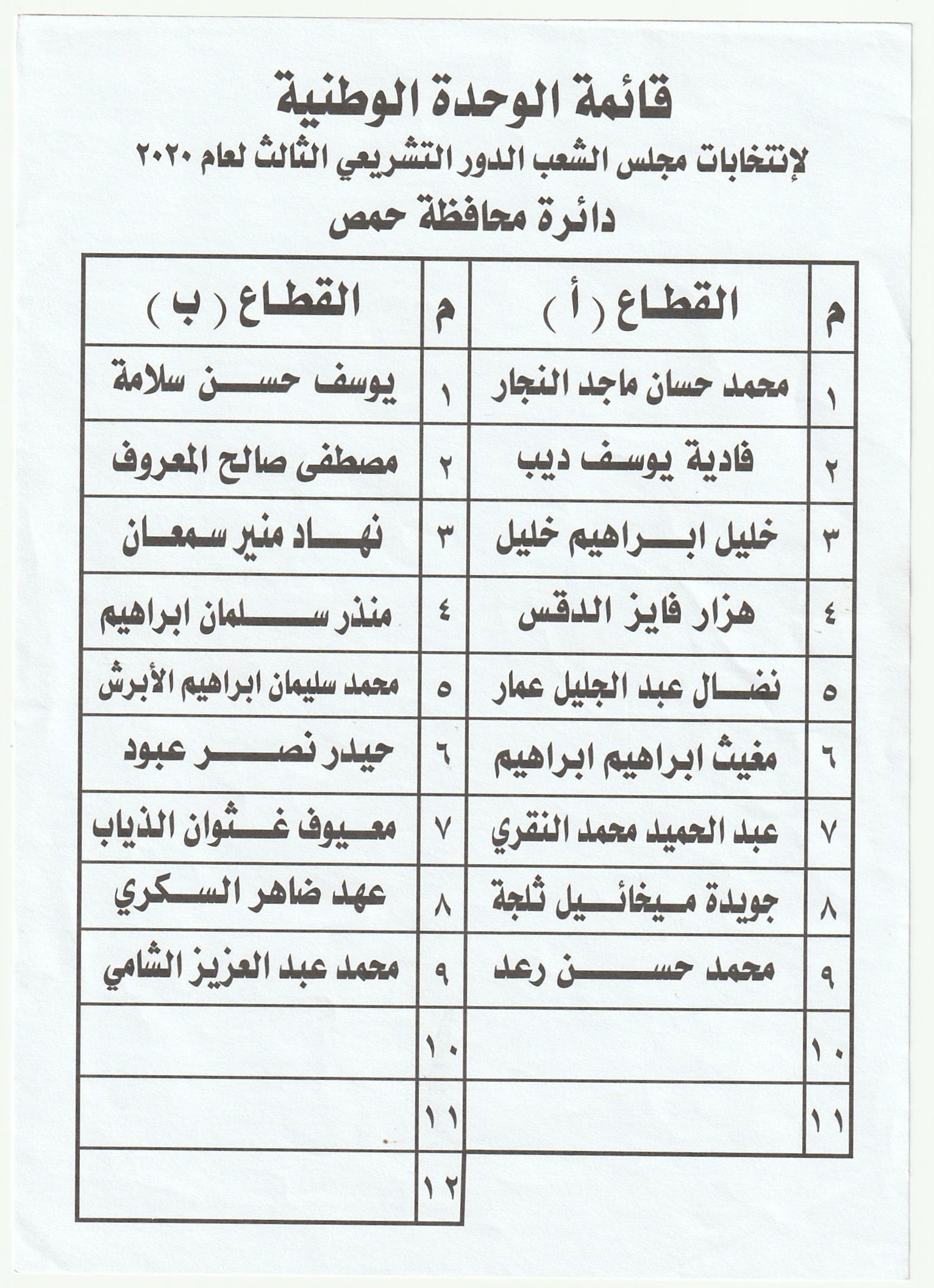
List of candidates for the constituency of Homs

The 250 seats of the People's Council of Syria are elected through party bloc voting in 15 multi-member constituencies. Voters in a riding choose a closed list of candidates that they cannot change from the proposed ones, and the one with the most votes wins all the seats at stake in the riding. Each list is made up of a minimum of two-thirds of Ba'ath Party candidates and half of workers and peasants, so that the total of the latter is 127 out of the total of 250 elected deputies.

In practice, committees appointed by a commission whose members are themselves chosen by the president decide on the validity of the candidacies of "workers and peasants," meaning the president has de facto control over who is allowed to run under that designation, and political parties other than the ruling Ba'ath Party are prohibited from criticising the national government or the Ba'ath Party under a ban on "weakening national sentiment". All members of the National Progressive Front are also loyal to the Ba'ath Party.

== Conduct ==
The electoral process was accessible to Syrians living in all areas held by the Syrian government, the Syrian Democratic Forces (SDF) allowed elections as well under joint government-SDF control, which is around 70% of the country's total territory. This made the 2020 election the first time since the beginning of the country's civil war in which a government-sponsored election was held in the provinces of Raqqa, Al-Hasakah and the government-controlled parts of Idlib. Previously, the armed groups that controlled those areas did not allow the Syrian Government to organize elections within them. However, the SDF did not allow the election to take place in areas under its exclusive rule, as they saw an election prior to dialogue and agreement on a solution to the end of the civil war as premature.

The country's electoral authorities officially stated that the elections were fair, noting that candidates, their representatives and the media would be allowed to monitor the voting and vote counting process. The Syrian Opposition and armed rebel groups within it, which don't recognize the government at all, rejected the election completely and refused to take part in it, leaving the ruling coalition to face very little opposition at the polls. The Middle East Institute claimed that "widespread electoral fraud" had taken place before and during the election. Aleppo candidate Fares Shehabi and the mostly Kurdish Youth and Justice Party protested on Facebook against irregularities; Youth and Justice Party candidate Borween Ibrahim was consequently arrested.

As the election was held during the COVID-19 pandemic in the country, voters had their temperature checked before being allowed into the voting premises, while election officials were required to wear masks and ensure that queues of voters observed social distancing.

Unknown individuals detonated a bomb inside a polling center in Busra al-Harir on election day, coinciding with two other bombings in the Syrian capital of Damascus, which detonated near a mosque in the Naher Aisha neighbourhood and killed at least one person.

== Results ==
Results were delayed as they had to be re-run in 5 of the over 7,000 total voting districts. Voting was held in 70% of Syrian territory.

The nationwide turnout for the election was 33.17%, as 6,224,687 voters voted in the election. This represented a decline in turnout, which the Syrian government attributed to the ongoing COVID-19 pandemic in Syria. Observers concurred that the deadly pandemic had significantly affected turnout, but added that the news of the election day bombings, wartime poverty and a lack of confidence in the ability of the parliament to end the crisis that had beset Syria since the start of the country's civil war were also major contributing factors to the low turnout.

There were several changes to the ethnic and religious makeup of parliamentary as a result of the election. Four Armenians were elected to the People's Council, an increase of one compared with the previous elections. The country's large Kurdish minority received six seats, a "token increase" from 2016. Druze received eight seats, though six of these were Ba'ath Party loyalists unlike in the 2016 election, where opposition-leaning Druze had received more support. There was a marginal increase in Alawite, Sunni, and Murshidi MPs. The number of Christian representatives declined from 22 to 18.

The pro-government National Progressive Front and its allies won 183 of the 250 seats. Overall, the NPF lost seats, particularly due to the SSNP suffering heavy losses, being reduced to three seats. These were attributed to the clashes between Assad and the SSNP before the election. The Ba'ath Party received 66.8% of the seats, registering victory. Militia representatives running as independents won several seats. In addition, candidates affiliated with Syrian First Lady Asma al-Assad won several seats which was interpreted by observers as showcasing her growing influence within the Syrian government.

In addition, the election resulted in a reduced representation of women, as 27 female candidates secured a seat, compared to 32 in 2016.

The First Hussein Arnous government was formed in the months after the election. The Second Hussein Arnous government was formed the following year.

Party or alliance		Votes	%	Seats
National Progressive Front	Ba'ath Party			167
National Progressive Front	Arab Socialist Union Party			3
National Progressive Front	Syrian Communist Party (Bakdash)			3
National Progressive Front	Syrian Social Nationalist Party			3
National Progressive Front	National Covenant Party			2
National Progressive Front	Socialist Unionist Party			2
National Progressive Front	Arab Democratic Union Party			1
National Progressive Front	Democratic Socialist Unionist Party			1
National Progressive Front	Syrian Communist Party (Unified)			1
Independents				67
Total				250
Total votes		6,224,687	–	
Registered voters/turnout		18,766,014	33.17	
Source: Middle East Institute
