= List of terms of the Parliament of Syria =

This is a list of legislative terms of Syria, covering all bodies that have held legislative power in the country since the end of Ottoman rule in 1918.

Syria's legislatures have taken many forms over the past century. The institutions entrusted with legislative power have differed widely in their composition, authority, and democratic legitimacy, reflecting the country's turbulent constitutional history. Some were elected bodies with genuine legislative power; others were constituent assemblies convened solely to draft constitutions; others still were appointed councils with little independence from the executive.

For much of the modern period, the Chamber of Deputies stood as the most powerful institution in the Syrian state. That changed abruptly with the Ba'ath Party takeover in 1963, after which the legislature was gradually subordinated to the executive and the party apparatus. Throughout the Ba'ath era (1963–2024), the People's Assembly functioned largely as a rubber-stamp body, ratifying decisions made elsewhere.

The fall of the Assad regime in December 2024 brought this period to a close; the parliament elected in 2024 was dissolved on 29 January 2025, and a transitional legislature was subsequently established under the Syrian Constitutional Declaration of March 2025.

== List ==
#	Name	Tenure	Duration (days)	Jurisdiction
–	Syrian National Congress	3 June 1919 – 25 July 1920	418	Kingdom
–	Federal Council	28 June 1922 – 1 January 1925	918	Syrian Federation (French Mandate)
–	Representative Councils	1923 – 1928		States of Damascus, Aleppo, Jabal Druze, the Alawites (French Mandate)
–	Constituent Assembly	9 June 1928 – 5 February 1929	241	State of Syria (French Mandate)
1	1st Chamber of Deputies	7 June 1932 – 25 November 1933	536	First Republic (French Mandate)
2	2nd Chamber of Deputies	21 December 1936 – 8 July 1939	929	First Republic (French Mandate)
3	3rd Chamber of Deputies	17 August 1943 – 31 May 1947	1,383	First Republic (French Mandate)
4	4th Chamber of Deputies	27 September 1947 – 30 March 1949	550	First Republic
–	Constituent Assembly	12 December 1949 – 5 September 1950	267	Second Republic
5	5th Chamber of Deputies (Note: The Fifth Chamber of Deputies was dissolved prematurely by a coup d'état in 1951. A new constitution was adopted in 1953, and a Sixth Chamber of Deputies was elected according to it. When the regime was overthrown in 1954, the Fifth Chamber of Deputies resumed its legislative functions from 15 March until the end of its term on 8 July, and a new Chamber of Deputies, also designated the Sixth, was elected in October 1954.)	5 September 1950 – 2 December 1951	453	Second Republic
6	6th Chamber of Deputies	24 October 1953 – 26 February 1954	125	Second Republic
5	5th Chamber of Deputies (Cont.)	15 March – 8 July 1954	115	Second Republic
7	6th Chamber of Deputies	14 October 1954 – 22 February 1958	1,227	Second Republic
–	National Assembly	21 July 1960 – 22 June 1961	336	United Arab Republic
–	Constituent and Parliamentary Assembly	12 December 1961 – 8 March 1963	451	Second Republic
–	National Revolutionary Council	1 September 1965 – 23 February 1966	175	Third Republic (pre-1973 Constitution)
8	Appointed People's Assembly	22 February 1971 – 21 March 1973	758	Third Republic (pre-1973 Constitution)
9	1st People's Assembly	9 June 1973 – 8 June 1977	1,460	Third Republic (1973 Constitution)
10	2nd People's Assembly	18 August 1977 – 17 August 1981	1,460	Third Republic (1973 Constitution)
11	3rd People's Assembly	16 November 1981 – 15 November 1985	1,460	Third Republic (1973 Constitution)
12	4th People's Assembly	27 February 1986 – 26 February 1990	1,460	Third Republic (1973 Constitution)
13	5th People's Assembly	11 June 1990 – 10 June 1994	1,460	Third Republic (1973 Constitution)
14	6th People's Assembly	10 September 1994 – 9 September 1998	1,460	Third Republic (1973 Constitution)
15	7th People's Assembly	17 December 1998 – 16 December 2002	1,460	Third Republic (1973 Constitution)
16	8th People's Assembly	9 March 2003 – 8 March 2007	1,460	Third Republic (1973 Constitution)
17	9th People's Assembly	7 May 2007 – 14 May 2012	1,834	Third Republic (1973 Constitution)
18	1st People's Assembly	24 May 2012 – 23 May 2016	1,460	Third Republic (2012 Constitution)
19	2nd People's Assembly	6 June 2016 – 25 June 2020	1,480	Third Republic (2012 Constitution)
20	3rd People's Assembly	10 August 2020 – 27 June 2024	1,417	Third Republic (2012 Constitution)
21	4th People's Assembly	21 August – 12 December 2024	112	Third Republic (2012 Constitution)
22	Transitional People's Assembly	12 July 2026 – present	130	Transitional period
