= Second Abdul Rahman Khleifawi government =

1976–1978 Syrian government

- 79th government of the Syrian Arab Republic

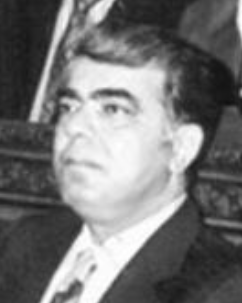
- Date formed: 7 August 1976
- Date dissolved: 30 March 1978

People and organisations
- President: Hafez al-Assad
- Prime Minister: Abdul Rahman Khleifawi
- Prime Minister's history: Khleifawi I
- Deputy Prime Ministers: Abdul Halim Khaddam; Jamil Shiya; Fahmi al-Youssefi
- Total no. of members: 36
- Member parties: ▌Ba'ath; ▌ASU; ▌SCP; ▌ASM; ▌SUP; ▌DASU
- Status in legislature: Majority coalition government

History
- Election: 1977
- Legislature terms: 1st and 2nd People's Assemblies
- Predecessor: M. al-Ayyubi
- Successor: al-Halabi

The Second Abdul Rahman Khleifawi government was the seventy-ninth government since the establishment of the modern Syrian state in 1918. Formed on 7 August 1976 by Decree No. 1439, it was the third government to serve under the presidency of Hafez al-Assad. The government was headed by Major General Abdul Rahman Khleifawi and remained in office until 30 March 1978.

The government was formed during a period of increasing regional tensions, including Syria's military intervention in the Lebanese Civil War. It continued the domestic and foreign policies of the Assad administration, overseeing the consolidation of Ba'ath Party rule while managing the political and military challenges arising from Syria's expanding regional role.

The government remained in office for nearly two years before being succeeded on 30 March 1978 by a new government headed by Muhammad Ali al-Halabi. Its tenure reflected the growing importance of security and regional affairs in Syrian government policy during the mid-1970s.

== Composition ==
Portfolio	Minister	Took office	Left office	Party
Prime Minister	Abdul Rahman Khleifawi	7 August 1976	30 March 1978	Ba'ath Party
Deputy Prime Minister	Abdul Halim Khaddam	21 November 1970	30 March 1978	Ba'ath Party
Deputy Prime Minister for Economical Affairs	Jamil Shiya	7 August 1976	30 March 1978	
Deputy Prime Minister for Services Affairs	Fahmi al-Youssefi	7 August 1976	30 March 1978	
Minister of Foreign Affairs	Abdul Halim Khaddam	21 November 1970	30 March 1978	Ba'ath Party
Minister of Defense	Mustafa Tlass	22 March 1972	30 March 1978	Ba'ath Party
Minister of Local Administration	Taha al-Kheirat	7 August 1976	30 March 1978	
Minister of Supply and Internal Trade	Muhammad Ghabbash	7 August 1976	30 March 1978	Ba'ath Party
Minister of State for Foreign Affairs	Abd al-Karim Zuhur Addi	7 August 1976	30 March 1978	
Minister of State for Presidential Affairs	Adib Mulhem	7 August 1976	30 March 1978	
Minister of the Euphrates Dam	Subhi Kahala	1 September 1974	30 March 1978	
Minister of Education	Shakir al-Fahham	26 September 1973	30 March 1978	Ba'ath Party
Minister of Justice	Adib al-Nahwi	21 November 1970	30 March 1978	
Minister of Transportation	Omar al-Sibai	21 November 1970	30 March 1978	Syrian Communist Party
Minister of Agriculture and Agrarian Reform	Ahmad Qablan	7 August 1976	30 March 1978	Ba'ath Party
Minister of Endowments	Abdul-Sattar al-Sayed	23 December 1972	30 March 1978	
Minister of Economy and Foreign Trade	Muhammad al-Amadi	23 December 1972	30 March 1978	Independent
Minister of State for Council of Ministers Affairs	Hussein Kuweidar	7 August 1976	30 March 1978	
Minister of Health	Madani al-Kheimi	23 December 1972	30 March 1978	
Minister of Higher Education	Muhammad Ali Hashem	6 September 1973	30 March 1978	
Minister of State	Zahir Abdul-Samad	23 December 1972	30 March 1978	
Minister of State	Diyaa Malwahi	7 August 1976	30 March 1978	
Minister of State	Youssef Je'edani	7 August 1976	30 March 1978	ASU
Minister of State	Sherif Koush	7 August 1976	30 March 1978	
Minister of Social Affairs and Labour	Anwar al-Hamadi	7 August 1976	30 March 1978	ASU
Minister of Industry	Shtewi Seifo	26 September 1973	30 March 1978	
Minister of Transport	Numan al-Zein	1 September 1974	30 March 1978	
Minister of Information	Ahmad Iskandar Ahmad	1 September 1974	30 March 1978	Ba'ath Party
Minister of Interior	Adnan Dabbagh	7 August 1976	30 March 1978	
Minister of Finance	Sadiq al-Ayuubi	7 August 1976	30 March 1978	
Minister of Electricity	Ahmad Omar Youssef	7 August 1976	30 March 1978	
Minister of Culture and National Guidance	Najah al-Attar	7 August 1976	30 March 1978	
Minister of Oil and Mineral Resources	Issa Darwish	7 August 1976	30 March 1978	
Minister of Tourism	Ghassan Shalhoub	7 August 1976	30 March 1978	
Minister of Housing and Utilities	Muharram Tayyara	7 August 1976	30 March 1978	
Minister of Public Works	Nazim Qaddour	7 August 1976	30 March 1978	
Minister of Water Resources	Nazim Qaddour	7 August 1976	30 March 1978	
Minister of State for Planning Affairs	George Houraniya	7 August 1976	30 March 1978	

== See also ==
- Council of Ministers (Syria)
- List of Syrian governments
- Government ministries of Syria
- List of prime ministers of Syria
