= Muhammad Ali al-Halabi government =

1978–1980 Syrian government

- 80th government of the Syrian Arab Republic

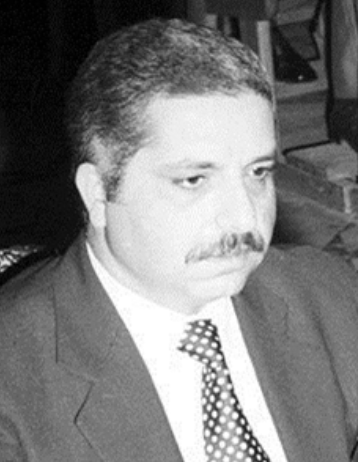
- Date formed: 30 March 1978
- Date dissolved: 14 January 1980

People and organisations
- President: Hafez al-Assad
- Prime Minister: Muhammad Ali al-Halabi
- Deputy Prime Ministers: Abdul Halim Khaddam; Jamil Shiya; Fahmi al-Youssefi
- Total no. of members: 36
- Member parties: ▌Ba'ath; ▌ASU; ▌SCP; ▌ASM; ▌SUP; ▌DASU
- Status in legislature: Majority coalition government

History
- Legislature term: 2nd People's Assembly
- Predecessor: Khleifawi II
- Successor: al-Kasm I

The Muhammad Ali al-Halabi government was the eightieth government since the establishment of the modern Syrian state in 1918. Formed on 30 March 1978 by Decree No. 339, it was the fourth government to serve under the presidency of Hafez al-Assad. The government was headed by Muhammad Ali al-Halabi and remained in office until 14 January 1980.

The government continued the domestic and foreign policies of the Assad administration during a period marked by increasing political unrest and regional instability. Domestically, it faced growing tensions arising from the escalating Islamist insurgency, while internationally it oversaw Syria's continued military involvement in the Lebanese Civil War and its efforts to consolidate its regional influence.

The government remained in office for nearly two years before being succeeded on 14 January 1980 by a new government headed by Abdul Rauf al-Kasm. Its tenure coincided with a period of mounting security challenges that shaped the direction of Syrian politics at the close of the 1970s.

== Composition ==
Portfolio	Minister	Took office	Left office	Party
Prime Minister	Muhammad Ali al-Halabi	30 March 1978	14 January 1980	Ba'ath Party
Deputy Prime Minister	Abdul Halim Khaddam	21 November 1970	14 January 1980	Ba'ath Party
Deputy Prime Minister for Economical Affairs	Jamil Shiya	7 August 1976	14 January 1980	
Deputy Prime Minister for Services Affairs	Fahmi al-Youssefi	7 August 1976	14 January 1980	
Minister of Foreign Affairs	Abdul Halim Khaddam	21 November 1970	14 January 1980	Ba'ath Party
Minister of Defense	Mustafa Tlass	22 March 1972	14 January 1980	Ba'ath Party
Minister of Local Administration	Taha al-Kheirat	7 August 1976	14 January 1980	
Minister of Education	Zuhair Masharqa	30 March 1978	14 January 1980	
Minister of Supply and Internal Trade	Muhammad Ghabbash	7 August 1976	14 January 1980	Ba'ath Party
Minister of State for Foreign Affairs	Abd al-Karim Zuhur Addi	7 August 1976	14 January 1980	
Minister of Presidential Affairs	Adib Mulhem	7 August 1976	14 January 1980	
Minister of the Euphrates Dam	Subhi Kahala	1 September 1974	14 January 1980	
Minister of Higher Education	Shakir al-Fahham	6 September 1973	14 January 1980	Ba'ath Party
Minister of Justice	Adib al-Nahwi	21 November 1970	14 January 1980	
Minister of Transportation	Omar al-Sibai	21 November 1970	14 January 1980	Syrian Communist Party
Minister of Agriculture and Agrarian Reform	Ahmad Qablan	7 August 1976	14 January 1980	Ba'ath Party
Minister of Endowments	Abdul-Sattar al-Sayed	7 August 1976	14 January 1980	
Minister of Economy and Foreign Trade	Muhammad al-Amadi	23 December 1972	14 January 1980	Independent
Minister of Health	Madani al-Kheimi	23 December 1972	14 January 1980	
Minister of State	Zahir Abdul-Samad	30 December 1972	14 January 1980	
Minister of State	Diyaa Malwahi	7 August 1976	14 January 1980	
Minister of State	Sherif Koush	7 August 1976	14 January 1980	
Minister of State	Safwan al-Qudsi	30 March 1978	14 January 1980	
Minister of State for Council of Ministers Affairs	Anwar al-Hamadi	30 March 1978	14 January 1980	ASU
Minister of Industry	Shtewi Seifo	26 September 1973	14 January 1980	
Minister of Information	Ahmad Iskandar Ahmad	1 September 1974	14 January 1980	Ba'ath Party
Minister of Interior	Adnan Dabbagh	7 August 1976	14 January 1980	
Minister of Finance	Sadiq al-Ayuubi	7 August 1976	14 January 1980	
Minister of Electricity	Ahmad Omar Youssef	7 August 1976	14 January 1980	
Minister of Culture and National Guidance	Najah al-Attar	7 August 1976	14 January 1980	
Minister of Oil and Mineral Resources	Issa Darwish	7 August 1976	14 January 1980	
Minister of Tourism	Ghassan Shalhoub	7 August 1976	14 January 1980	
Minister of Housing and Utilities	Muharram Tayyara	7 August 1976	14 January 1980	
Minister of Public Works	Nazim Qaddour	7 August 1976	14 January 1980	
Minister of Water Resources	Nazim Qaddour	7 August 1976	14 January 1980	
Minister of State for Planning Affairs	George Houraniya	7 August 1976	14 January 1980	
Minister of Social Affairs and Labour	Youssef Je'edani	30 March 1978	14 January 1980	ASU
Minister of Transport	Salim Yasin	30 March 1978	14 January 1980	

== See also ==
- Council of Ministers (Syria)
- List of Syrian governments
- Government ministries of Syria
- List of prime ministers of Syria
