= List of members of the People's Assembly (Syria), 1971–1973 =

This is a list of members elected to the People's Assembly by the Regional Command of the Ba'ath Party and appointed by President Hafez al-Assad.

== Members ==
No.	Name	Party
1	Ahmad al-Khatib	Ba'ath Party
2	Abdallah al-Ahmar	Ba'ath Party
3	Muhammad Hilal	Ba'ath Party
4	Abd al-Halim Khaddam	Ba'ath Party
5	Mahmoud al-Ayyubi	Ba'ath Party
6	Muhammad Haidar	Ba'ath Party
7	Fahmi al-Youssefi	Ba'ath Party
8	Abd al-Karim Uday	
9	Jabr al-Kafri	
10	Mustafa Tlass	Ba'ath Party
11	Abd al-Rahman Khalifawi	Ba'ath Party
12	Ali al-Halabi	Ba'ath Party
13	Dawud al-Raddawi	Ba'ath Party
14	Naji al-Hamid	
15	Abdallah al-Ahmad	Ba'ath Party
16	Abdallah ibn al-Ladhqani	
17	Muhammad Jaber Bahbouh	
18	Abd al-Ghani Ibrahim	
19	Abd al-Ghani Qanout	Arab Socialist Movement
20	Muhammad Sami Soufan	
21	Shakir Al Faham	Ba'ath Party
22	Mustafa Haddad	
23	Nur Allah Ridha Nur Allah	
24	Fawzi al-Kiyali	Arab Socialist Movement
25	Mustafa al-Hallaj	
26	Adeeb al-Nahwi	Arab Socialist Movement
27	Adnan Baghjati	
28	Ghazi Nassif	
29	Ouda Qassis	
30	Muhammad Ali al-Ashqar	
31	Michel Richa	
32	Mahmoud Hadid	
33	Jamal Abd al-Din	
34	Aziz al-Nasser	
35	Ibrahim al-Louzi	
36	Walid al-Azhari	
37	Mahmoud Abd al-Qadir	
38	Kamel Aroub	
39	Dia al-Hajj Ali	
40	Ayyad Ali al-Tah	
41	Muhammad Abdallah	
42	Samih al-Maala	
43	Mustafa al-Ayed	
44	Shibli Nasr Abu Shibli	
45	Fadel Saleh Ghadab	
46	Faiz al-Nasser	
47	Ghadir Zizfoun	
48	Hussein al-Rifai	
49	Issam Ibrahim	
50	Shawqi al-Sibai	
51	Youssef Siyasneh	
52	Muhammad Dia Malouhi	
53	Souad Abdallah	
54	Souad al-Zain	
55	Georgette Warda	
56	Umayma Diab	
57	Mahdi Haddad	
58	Ahmad Kaftaru	
59	Muhammad Abu al-Saud al-Hakim	
60	Omar Ahmad Uzi al-Hajj al-Naqshbandi	
61	Riyadh al-Abed	
62	Muhammad Salim Aqil	
63	Ahmad Khaddour	
64	Ghassan Shalhoub	
65	Hassan Abd al-Azim	
66	Muhammad Abd al-Majid Manjouna	Arab Socialist Movement
67	Grigor Ablighatian	
68	Abdallah Moosalli	
69	Hamoud Bakfani	
70	Najm al-Din al-Salih	
71	Muhammad Issam al-Naib	
72	Morris Salibi	
73	Samih Atiya	
74	George Shahristan	
75	Othman ibn Ahmad Uday	
76	Fatehi Aloush	
77	Majid Azo al-Rahibani	
78	Muhammad al-Shami	
79	Abd al-Razzaq al-Shuqfi	
80	Ghazi al-Ma'sarani	
81	Mahmoud Sa'ada	
82	Muhammad Ali Taj al-Din Hashim	
83	Subhi Taha	
84	Madani al-Khaimi	
85	Muhammad Khair Kiyali	
86	Dimitri Ward	
87	Abd al-Baqi Abdallah	
88	Mohsen Ali al-Khair	
89	Abd al-Aziz Othman	
90	Abd al-Qadir Arja	
91	Abd al-Qadir Faqfouqa	
92	Ahmad Zarq Farhat	
93	Samih Fakhouri	
94	Muhammad Ibrigh	
95	Mahmoud al-Zoubi	Ba'ath Party
96	Abd al-Sattar Othman	
97	Shahin Atfeh	
98	Ibrahim al-Bakari	
99	Wafiq al-Ayyubi	
100	Muhammad As'ad al-Hamad	
101	Burhan al-Shami	
102	Mudhi al-Sahwi	
103	Tawfiq al-‘Allu al-Ibrahim	
104	Ali al-Ahmad al-‘Ubayd	
105	Abdu al-Shaqi	
106	Hussein Ghanam	
107	Subhi Shikhuni	
108	Ali Taljabini	
109	Khalid Hamama	
110	Bakri Anjarini	
111	Ahmad Hafian	
112	Diab Muhammad Diab	
113	Ali Aliwi San'a'a	
114	Abdallah Shukri	
115	Hassan Ghanam	
116	Rashid Arqawi	
117	Mahmoud al-Saadi	
118	Jamil Ghraz al-Din	
119	Nasr Zarif	
120	Ali Shahin	
121	Ali Habib Abbas	
122	Hazim Hazim	
123	Muhammad Eid Latmini	
124	Muhammad Khalaf Shawardi	
125	Ali As'ad Tahour	
126	Muhammad Subha	
127	Khali al-Khidr	
128	Abd al-Majid Bali	
129	Nur al-Din Khaddour	
130	Ismail al-Qasim	
131	Muhammad al-Qasim Mahmoud	
132	Jasim al-Huwaidi	
133	Burij Abd al-Hadi	
134	Matar al-Jasim	
135	Abd al-Latif Maarouf	
136	Muhammad Hamza al-Hussein	
137	Ahmad Taqi al-Din	
138	Rafla al-Shaghouri	
139	Tahsin al-Safadi	
140	Hussein Battikha	
141	Kamal Taha	
142	Abd al-Hadi Abla	
143	Adham Mustafa	
144	Salama al-Aghwani	
145	Fouad Hamza	
146	George Sidqi	
147	Hassan Abu Zaid	
148	Mahmoud al-Shaykh Hassan	
149	Ibrahim Hawara	
150	Yunis Hussein	
151	Muhammad Habbal	
152	Raghib Qaytaz	
153	Ahmad Salim	
154	Mahmoud Qaddour	
155	Shakir Barghouth	
156	Jasim Aloush	
157	Suleiman al-Hajwan	
158	Muhammad Hussein Ismail	
159	Kazem Abd al-Hamid	
160	Othman Ibrahim	
161	Salum Shu'ibi	
162	Taha Haddad	
163	Rais al-Farhan al-Fayyad	
164	Muharram Tiyara	
165	Mahmoud Ali Mansour	
166	Salim Said Yassin	
167	Siyah Amer	
168	Abd al-Hamid Dar'i Brazi	
169	Rubin Dararian	
170	Munir Berkhan	
171	Badee al-Alusi	
172	Saeed al-Khouri	
173	Fateh al-Hamwi	
