= First Mahmoud Al-Zoubi government =

1987–1992 Syrian government

- 84th government of the Syrian Arab Republic

- Date formed: 1 November 1987
- Date dissolved: 29 June 1992

People and organisations
- President: Hafez al-Assad
- Prime Minister: Mahmoud Al-Zoubi
- Deputy Prime Ministers: Mustafa Tlass; Mahmoud Qaddour; Salim Yasin
- Total no. of members: 35
- Member parties: ▌Ba'ath; ▌ASU; ▌SCP; ▌ASM; ▌SUP
- Status in legislature: Majority coalition government

History
- Election: 1990
- Legislature terms: 4th and 5th People's Assemblies
- Predecessor: al-Kasm III
- Successor: al-Zoubi II

The First Mahmoud Al-Zoubi government was the eighty-fourth government since the establishment of the modern Syrian state in 1918. Formed on 1 November 1987 by Decree No. 238, it was the eighth government to serve under the presidency of Hafez al-Assad. The government was headed by Mahmoud Al-Zoubi and remained in office until 29 June 1992.

The government was established during the later years of Hafez al-Assad's presidency and continued the administrative and political framework of the Ba'athist state. It oversaw Syria during a period marked by economic difficulties, regional changes following the end of the Cold War, and the aftermath of the Gulf War.

During its tenure, the government managed state affairs while maintaining Syria's existing political system and its regional role. The government remained in office for nearly five years, making it one of the longest-serving governments of the Assad era, before being succeeded on 29 June 1992 by a new government also headed by al-Zoubi.

== Composition ==
Portfolio	Minister	Took office	Left office	Party
Prime Minister	Mahmoud Al-Zoubi	1 November 1987	29 June 1992	Ba'ath Party
Deputy Prime Minister	Mustafa Tlass	11 March 1984	29 June 1992	Ba'ath Party
Deputy Prime Minister for Services Affairs	Mahmoud Qaddour	8 April 1985	29 June 1992	
Deputy Prime Minister for Economical Affairs	Salim Yasin	8 April 1985	29 June 1992	
Minister of Defense	Mustafa Tlass	22 March 1972	29 June 1992	Ba'ath Party
Minister of Agriculture and Agrarian Reform	Muhammad Ghabbash	1 November 1987	29 June 1992	Ba'ath Party
Minister of Higher Education	Kamal Sharaf	8 April 1985	29 June 1992	
Minister of Foreign Affairs	Farouk al-Sharaa	11 March 1984	29 June 1992	Ba'ath Party
Minister of State for Council of Ministers Affairs	Yasin Rajouh	1 November 1987	29 June 1992	
Minister of Transport	Youssef al-Ahmad	8 April 1985	29 June 1992	
Minister of Interior	Muhammad Harba	1 November 1987	29 June 1992	
Minister of Local Administration	Ahmad Diyab	1 November 1987	29 June 1992	
Minister of Information	Muhammad Salman	1 November 1987	29 June 1992	
Minister of Supply and Internal Trade	Hassan al-Saqqa	1 November 1987	29 June 1992	
Minister of Economy and Foreign Trade	Muhammad al-Amadi	8 April 1985	29 June 1992	Independent
Minister of Culture	Najah al-Attar	7 August 1972	29 June 1992	
Minister of Irrigation	Abdul-Rahman Madani	3 December 1981	29 June 1992	
Minister of Industry	Antouan Jubran	1 November 1987	29 June 1992	
Minister of Presidential Affairs	Wahib Fadel	11 March 1984	29 June 1992	
Minister of Electricity	Kamel al-Baba	11 March 1984	29 June 1992	
Minister of Tourism	Adnan Quli	1 November 1987	29 June 1992	
Minister of State for Planning Affairs	Sabah Baqjaji	8 April 1985	1 November 1987	
Minister of State	Muhammad Jumaa	8 April 1985	29 June 1992	
Minister of State	Ghazi Mustafa	8 April 1985	29 June 1992	
Minister of State	Ali Khalil	1 November 1987	29 June 1992	
Minister of Transportation	Murad Quwatli	8 April 1985	29 June 1992	
Minister of State for Environmental Affairs	Abdul-Hamid Manjad	1 November 1987	29 June 1992	
Minister of Education	Muhammad Ghassan al-Halabi	1 November 1987	29 June 1992	
Minister of State for Foreign Affairs	Nasser Qaddour	1 November 1987	29 June 1992	
Minister of Finance	Khalid al-Mahaini	1 November 1987	29 June 1992	
Minister of Health	Muhammad Iyad al-Shatti	1 November 1987	29 June 1992	
Minister of Oil and Mineral Resources	Matanyus Habib	1 November 1987	29 June 1992	
Minister of Endowments	Abdul-Majid Tarabulsi	1 November 1987	29 June 1992	
Minister of Housing and Utilities	Muhammad Nour Intabi	1 November 1987	29 June 1992	
Minister of Justice	Khalid al-Ansari	1 November 1987	29 June 1992	
Minister of Construction and Reconstruction	Marwan Fara	1 November 1987	29 June 1992	
Minister of Labor and Social Affairs	Haidar Bozo	1 November 1987	29 June 1992	

== See also ==
- Council of Ministers (Syria)
- List of Syrian governments
- Government ministries of Syria
- List of prime ministers of Syria
