= Third Abdul Rauf al-Kasm government =

1985–1987 Syrian government

- 83rd government of the Syrian Arab Republic

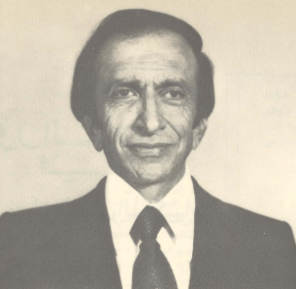
- Date formed: 8 April 1985
- Date dissolved: 1 November 1987

People and organisations
- President: Hafez al-Assad
- Prime Minister: Abdul Rauf al-Kasm
- Prime Minister's history: al-Kasm I al-Kasm II
- Deputy Prime Ministers: Mustafa Tlass; Mahmoud Qaddour; Salim Yasin
- Total no. of members: 34
- Member parties: ▌Ba'ath; ▌ASU; ▌SCP; ▌ASM; ▌SUP
- Status in legislature: Majority coalition government

History
- Election: 1986
- Legislature terms: 3rd 4th People's Assemblies
- Predecessor: al-Kasm II
- Successor: al-Zoubi I

The Third Abdul Rauf al-Kasm government was the eighty-third government since the establishment of the modern Syrian state in 1918. Formed on 8 April 1985 by Decree No. 1044, it was the seventh government to serve under the presidency of Hafez al-Assad. The government was headed by Abdul Rauf al-Kasm and remained in office until 1 November 1987.

The government represented a continuation of the Assad administration's policies and was responsible for overseeing Syria's domestic administration during a period of relative political stability. It also managed the country's continued involvement in regional affairs, particularly its political and military role in Lebanon, while maintaining the centralised political system dominated by the Arab Socialist Ba'ath Party.

The government remained in office for more than two and a half years before being succeeded on 1 November 1987 by a new government headed by Mahmoud al-Zoubi. It was the final government led by Abdul Rauf al-Kasm, concluding his tenure as Prime Minister after serving in office for nearly eight years.

== Composition ==
Portfolio	Minister	Took office	Left office	Party
Prime Minister	Abdul Rauf al-Kasm	14 January 1980	1 November 1987	Ba'ath Party
Deputy Prime Minister	Mustafa Tlass	11 March 1984	1 November 1987	Ba'ath Party
Deputy Prime Minister for Services Affairs	Mahmoud Qaddour	8 April 1985	1 November 1987	
Deputy Prime Minister for Economical Affairs	Salim Yasin	8 April 1985	1 November 1987	
Minister of Defense	Mustafa Tlass	22 March 1972	1 November 1987	Ba'ath Party
Minister of Interior	Muhammad Ghabbash	8 April 1985	1 November 1987	Ba'ath Party
Minister of Education	Muhammad Najib al-Sayid Ahmad	14 January 1980	1 November 1987	Ba'ath Party
Minister of Higher Education	Kamal Sharaf	8 April 1985	1 November 1987	
Minister of Foreign Affairs	Farouk al-Sharaa	11 March 1984	1 November 1987	Ba'ath Party
Minister of Information	Yasin Rajouh	11 March 1984	1 November 1987	
Minister of Transport	Youssef al-Ahmad	8 April 1985	1 November 1987	
Minister of Local Administration	Muhammad Harba	8 April 1985	1 November 1987	
Minister of Supply and Internal Trade	Riyad al-Haj Khalil	8 April 1985	1 November 1987	
Minister of Economy and Foreign Trade	Muhammad al-Amadi	8 April 1985	1 November 1987	Independent
Minister of Culture	Najah al-Attar	7 August 1972	1 November 1987	
Minister of Tourism	Nawras al-Diqir	3 December 1981	1 November 1987	
Minister of Health	Ghassoub al-Refai	14 January 1980	1 November 1987	
Minister of Endowments	Muhammad al-Khatib	14 January 1980	1 November 1987	
Minister of Irrigation	Abdul-Rahman Madani	3 December 1981	1 November 1987	
Minister of State for People's Assembly Affairs	Antouan Jubran	8 April 1985	1 November 1987	
Minister of Labor and Social Affairs	Antouan Jubran (acting)	8 April 1985	1 November 1987	
Minister of Presidential Affairs	Wahib Fadel	11 March 1984	1 November 1987	
Minister of Electricity	Kamel al-Baba	11 March 1984	1 November 1987	
Minister of Oil and Mineral Resources	Ghazi al-Droubi	11 March 1984	1 November 1987	
Minister of Construction and Reconstruction	Riyad al-Baghdadi	11 March 1984	1 November 1987	
Minister of State for Foreign Affairs	Issam al-Nayeb	8 April 1985	1 November 1987	
Minister of Housing and Utilities	Adnan Quli	8 April 1985	1 November 1987	
Minister of Agriculture and Agrarian Reform	Mahmoud al-Kurdi	8 April 1985	1 November 1987	
Minister of Finance	Qahtan al-Suyufi	8 April 1985	1 November 1987	
Minister of Industry	Ali Tarabulsi	8 April 1985	1 November 1987	
Minister of State for Planning Affairs	Sabah Baqjaji	8 April 1985	1 November 1987	
Minister of State	Muhammad Jumaa	8 April 1985	1 November 1987	
Minister of State	Abdul-Hamid Manjad	8 April 1985	1 November 1987	
Minister of State	Ghazi Mustafa	8 April 1985	1 November 1987	
Minister of State for Council of Ministers Affairs	Abdul-Munim Hamawi	8 April 1985	1 November 1987	
Minister of Transportation	Murad Quwatli	8 April 1985	1 November 1987	
Minister of Justice	Shaaban Shahin	8 April 1985	1 November 1987	

== See also ==
- Council of Ministers (Syria)
- List of Syrian governments
- Government ministries of Syria
- List of prime ministers of Syria
