= 4th People's Assembly of Syria (1986–1990) =

Legislative term of Syria's parliament from 1986 to 1990

4th People's Assembly
←	3rd	5th	→

Overview
- Legislative body: People's Assembly
- Jurisdiction: Syria
- Meeting place: People's Assembly Building, Damascus
- Term: 27 February 1986 – 26 February 1990
- Election: 1986
- Government: al-Kasm III (until 1 November 1987); al-Zoubi I (from 1 November 1987)
- Members: 195
- Speaker: Mahmoud Al-Zoubi (Ba'ath Party) (until 18 February 1988); Abd al-Qadir Qaddura (Ba'ath Party) (from 19 February 1988)

Sessions
- 1st: 27 February – 31 March 1986
- 2nd: 17 May – 30 June 1986
- 3rd: ? – ?
- 4th: 15 February – 31 March 1987
- 5th: 16 May – 30 June 1987
- 6th: 7 October – 31 December 1987
- 7th: 15 February – 31 March 1988
- 8th: 21 May – 30 June 1988
- 9th: 4 October – 29 December 1988
- 10th: 15 February – 30 March 1989
- 11th: 15 May – 30 June 1989
- 12th: 3 October – 29 December 1989
- 13th: 15–26 February 1990

Special sessions
- 1st: 15–25 July 1986
- 2nd: 27 January – 12 February 1990

The Fourth People's Assembly (Arabic: مجلس الشعب للدور التشريعي الرابع, romanized: Majlis al-Shaʻb lil-dawr al-tashrīʻī al-rābiʻ) was the fourth legislature elected under the 1973 Constitution, serving from 27 February 1986 to 26 February 1990.

Legislative elections were held on 11 February 1986. The Assembly convened for its first session on 27 February 1986 with a total of 195 members, including 18 women, representing the Arab Socialist Ba'ath Party, the Syrian Communist Party (Bakdash), the Syrian Communist Party (Unified), the Arab Socialist Union, the Socialist Unionists, the Arab Socialist Movement, and independents.

During its inaugural session, the Assembly elected Mahmoud al-Zoubi as Speaker and proceeded to elect the members of its bureau. On the same day, President Hafez al-Assad delivered an address before the Assembly marking the opening of the legislative term.

== Bureau ==
Position	Name	Party	Tenure
Speaker	Mahmoud al-Zoubi	Ba'ath Party	16 November 1981 – 18 February 1988
Speaker	Abd al-Qadir Qaddura	Ba'ath Party	19 February 1988 – 26 February 1990
Deputy Speaker	Ali Rida		27 February 1986 – 26 February 1990
Secretary	Muhammad Saad		27 February 1986 – 26 February 1990
Secretary	Majed Izzo Rahibani		27 February 1986 – 26 February 1990
Overseer	Ghassan al-Abd al-Rajab		27 February 1986 – 26 February 1990
Overseer	Muhammad Khair Halabi		27 February 1986 – 26 February 1990

== Activities ==
On 26 October 1987, the Assembly voted to withdraw confidence from Minister of Supply and Internal Trade Riyad al-Hajj Khalil by a majority of 175 members. The following day, on 27 October 1987, it similarly withdrew confidence from Minister of Industry Ali Traboulsi by a majority of 177 members.

On 1 November 1987, Speaker Mahmud al-Zoubi was tasked with forming a government. He was subsequently replaced as Speaker on 29 February 1988 by Abd al-Qadir Qaddura following his appointment as Prime Minister.
