= Second Abdul Rauf al-Kasm government =

1984–1985 Syrian government

- 82nd government of the Syrian Arab Republic

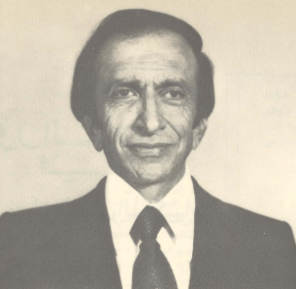
- Date formed: 11 March 1984
- Date dissolved: 7 April 1985

People and organisations
- President: Hafez al-Assad
- Prime Minister: Abdul Rauf al-Kasm
- Prime Minister's history: al-Kasm I
- Deputy Prime Ministers: Mustafa Tlass; Walid Hamdoun; Abdul Qadir Qaddura
- Total no. of members: 35
- Member parties: ▌Ba'ath; ▌ASU; ▌SCP; ▌ASM; ▌SUP
- Status in legislature: Majority coalition government

History
- Legislature term: 3rd People's Assembly
- Predecessor: al-Kasm I
- Successor: al-Kasm III

The Second Abdul Rauf al-Kasm government was the eighty-second government since the establishment of the modern Syrian state in 1918. Formed on 11 March 1984 by Decree No. 694, it was the sixth government to serve under the presidency of Hafez al-Assad. The government was headed by Abdul Rauf al-Kasm and remained in office until 7 April 1985.

The government was formed following the resignation of al-Kasm's first government and represented a continuation of the political and administrative programme pursued under President Hafez al-Assad. It oversaw the day-to-day administration of the Syrian state during a period characterised by political stability at home and Syria's continued military and diplomatic involvement in regional affairs, particularly in Lebanon.

The government remained in office for just over a year before being replaced on 7 April 1985 by a new government headed by al-Kasm.

== Composition ==
| Portfolio | Minister | Took office | Left office | Party |
|---|---|---|---|---|
| Prime Minister | Abdul Rauf al-Kasm | 14 January 1980 | 7 April 1985 | Ba'ath Party |
| Deputy Prime Minister | Mustafa Tlass | 11 March 1984 | 7 April 1985 | Ba'ath Party |
| Deputy Prime Minister for Services Affairs | Walid Hamdoun | 14 January 1980 | 7 April 1985 | Ba'ath Party |
| Deputy Prime Minister for Economical Affairs | Abdul Qadir Qaddura | 14 January 1980 | 7 April 1985 | Ba'ath Party |
| Minister of Defense | Mustafa Tlass | 22 March 1972 | 7 April 1985 | Ba'ath Party |
| Minister of Interior | Nasser al-Din Nasser | 7 August 1976 | 7 April 1985 | Ba'ath Party |
| Minister of Supply and Internal Trade | Muhammad Ghabbash | 7 August 1976 | 7 April 1985 | Ba'ath Party |
| Minister of Education | Muhammad Najib al-Sayid Ahmad | 14 January 1980 | 7 April 1985 | Ba'ath Party |
| Minister of State for Planning Affairs | Kamal Sharaf | 3 December 1981 | 7 April 1985 | |
| Minister of Industry | Mahmoud Qaddour | 3 December 1981 | 7 April 1985 | |
| Minister of Local Administration | Abd al-Karim Zuhur Addi | 11 March 1984 | 7 April 1985 | |
| Minister of Culture | Najah al-Attar | 7 August 1972 | 7 April 1985 | |
| Minister of Social Affairs and Labour | Youssef Je'edani | 30 March 1978 | 7 April 1985 | ASU |
| Minister of Economy and Foreign Trade | Salim Yasin | 11 March 1984 | 7 April 1985 | |
| Minister of Foreign Affairs | Farouk al-Sharaa | 11 March 1984 | 7 April 1985 | Ba'ath Party |
| Minister of State for People's Assembly Affairs | Nayef Te'ani | 11 March 1984 | 7 April 1985 | |
| Minister of Finance | Hamdi al-Saqqa | 14 January 1980 | 7 April 1985 | |
| Minister of Tourism | Nawras al-Diqir | 3 December 1981 | 7 April 1985 | |
| Minister of Justice | Khalid al-Maliki | 14 January 1980 | 7 April 1985 | |
| Minister of State | Mikhail Naqqul | 14 January 1980 | 7 April 1985 | |
| Minister of State | Daoud Hido | 3 December 1981 | 7 April 1985 | |
| Minister of State | Deeb al-Masri | 3 December 1981 | 7 April 1985 | |
| Minister of State | Hikmat Beyazid | 3 December 1981 | 7 April 1985 | |
| Minister of Transportation | Raafat al-Kurdi | 14 January 1980 | 7 April 1985 | |
| Minister of Housing and Utilities | Ahmad Salim Darwish | 3 December 1981 | 7 April 1985 | |
| Minister of Health | Ghassoub al-Refai | 14 January 1980 | 7 April 1985 | |
| Minister of Endowments | Muhammad al-Khatib | 14 January 1980 | 7 April 1985 | |
| Minister of Transport | Younnes Muhammad | 3 December 1981 | 7 April 1985 | |
| Minister of Agriculture and Agrarian Reform | Ammash Jedea | 3 December 1981 | 7 April 1985 | |
| Minister of Irrigation | Abdul-Rahman Madani | 3 December 1981 | 7 April 1985 | |
| Minister of State for Council of Ministers Affairs | Antouan Jubran | 3 December 1981 | 7 April 1985 | |
| Minister of Presidential Affairs | Wahib Fadel | 11 March 1984 | 7 April 1985 | |
| Minister of Information | Yasin Rajouh | 11 March 1984 | 7 April 1985 | |
| Minister of Higher Education | Ziyad Shuweiki | 11 March 1984 | 7 April 1985 | |
| Minister of Electricity | Kamel al-Baba | 11 March 1984 | 7 April 1985 | |
| Minister of Oil and Mineral Resources | Ghazi al-Droubi | 11 March 1984 | 7 April 1985 | |
| Minister of Construction and Reconstruction | Riyad al-Baghdadi | 11 March 1984 | 7 April 1985 | |

== See also ==
- Council of Ministers (Syria)
- List of Syrian governments
- Government ministries of Syria
- List of prime ministers of Syria
