= Second Mahmoud Al-Zoubi government =

1992–2000 Syrian government

- 85th government of the Syrian Arab Republic

- Date formed: 29 June 1992
- Date dissolved: 13 March 2000

People and organisations
- President: Hafez al-Assad
- Prime Minister: Mahmoud Al-Zoubi
- Prime Minister's history: al-Zoubi I
- Deputy Prime Ministers: Mustafa Tlass; Rashid Akhterini; Salim Yasin
- Total no. of members: 36
- Member parties: ▌Ba'ath; ▌ASU; ▌SCP; ▌ASM; ▌SUP
- Status in legislature: Majority coalition government

History
- Elections: 1994; 1998
- Legislature terms: 5th, 6th, and 7th People's Assemblies
- Predecessor: al-Zoubi I
- Successor: Mero I

The Second Mahmoud Al-Zoubi government was the eighty-fifth government since the establishment of the modern Syrian state in 1918. Formed on 29 June 1992 by Decree No. 153, it was the ninth government to serve under the presidency of Hafez al-Assad. The government was headed by Mahmoud Al-Zoubi and remained in office until 13 March 2000.

The government continued the political and administrative framework established during Hafez al-Assad's presidency, overseeing Syria during the final years of his rule. Its tenure included a period of regional transformation following the end of the Cold War and the changing political environment in the Middle East.

During its time in office, the government managed state affairs under the continued dominance of the Arab Socialist Ba'ath Party and maintained Syria's established economic and foreign policy approaches. The government remained in office for nearly eight years, making it one of the longest-serving cabinets in modern Syrian history.

The government resigned on 13 March 2000, shortly before the death of President Hafez al-Assad on 10 June 2000 and the subsequent transition of power to Bashar al-Assad.

== Composition ==
Portfolio	Minister	Took office	Left office	Party
Prime Minister	Mahmoud Al-Zoubi	1 November 1987	13 March 2000	Ba'ath Party
Deputy Prime Minister	Mustafa Tlass	11 March 1984	13 March 2000	Ba'ath Party
Deputy Prime Minister for Services Affairs	Rashid Akhterini	29 June 1992	13 March 2000	
Deputy Prime Minister for Economical Affairs	Salim Yasin	8 April 1985	13 March 2000	
Minister of Defense	Mustafa Tlass	22 March 1972	13 March 2000	Ba'ath Party
Minister of Foreign Affairs	Farouk al-Sharaa	11 March 1984	13 March 2000	Ba'ath Party
Minister of State	Youssef al-Ahmad	29 June 1992	13 March 2000	
Minister of State	Hussein Hassoun	29 June 1992	13 March 2000	
Minister of State	Nabil Mallah	29 June 1992	13 March 2000	
Minister of State	Hanna Murad	29 June 1992	13 March 2000	
Minister of Interior	Muhammad Harba	1 November 1987	13 March 2000	
Minister of Information	Muhammad Salman	1 November 1987	13 March 2000	
Minister of Economy and Foreign Trade	Muhammad al-Amadi	8 April 1985	13 March 2000	Independent
Minister of Culture	Najah al-Attar	3 December 1972	13 March 2000	
Minister of Irrigation	Abdul-Rahman Madani	3 December 1981	13 March 2000	
Minister of Presidential Affairs	Wahib Fadel	11 March 1984	13 March 2000	
Minister of Electricity	Kamel al-Baba	11 March 1984	13 March 2000	
Minister of State for Environmental Affairs	Abdul-Hamid Manjad	1 November 1987	13 March 2000	
Minister of Education	Muhammad Ghassan al-Halabi	1 November 1987	13 March 2000	
Minister of State for Foreign Affairs	Nasser Qaddour	1 November 1987	13 March 2000	
Minister of Finance	Khalid al-Mahaini	1 November 1987	13 March 2000	
Minister of Health	Muhammad Iyad al-Shatti	1 November 1987	13 March 2000	
Minister of Endowments	Abdul-Majid Tarabulsi	1 November 1987	13 March 2000	
Minister of Social Affairs and Labor	Ali Khalil	29 June 1992	13 March 2000	
Minister of Supply and Internal Trade	Nadim Akkash	29 June 1992	13 March 2000	
Minister of Tourism	Muhammad Amin Abu al-Shamat	29 June 1992	13 March 2000	
Minister of State for Council of Ministers Affairs	Danho Daoud	29 June 1992	13 March 2000	
Minister of Agriculture and Agrarian Reform	Asaad Mustafa	29 June 1992	13 March 2000	
Minister of Local Administration	Yahya Abu Assali	29 June 1992	13 March 2000	
Minister of Oil and Mineral Resources	Ahmad Nader Nabulsi	29 June 1992	13 March 2000	
Minister of State for Planning Affairs	Abd al-Rahim Subei	29 June 1992	13 March 2000	
Minister of Justice	Abdullah Talbah	29 June 1992	13 March 2000	
Minister of Higher Education	Saliha Sanqar	29 June 1992	13 March 2000	
Minister of Transportation	Radwan Martini	29 June 1992	13 March 2000	
Minister of Industry	Ahmad Nizam al-Din	29 June 1992	13 March 2000	
Minister of Transport	Mufid Abdul-Karim	29 June 1992	13 March 2000	
Minister of Construction and Reconstruction	Majed Izzo al-Rhebani	29 June 1992	13 March 2000	
Minister of Housing and Utilities	Husam al-Safadi	29 June 1992	13 March 2000	

== See also ==
- Council of Ministers (Syria)
- List of Syrian governments
- Government ministries of Syria
- List of prime ministers of Syria
