= 3rd People's Assembly of Syria (1981–1985) =

Legislative term of Syria's parliament from 1981 to 1985

3rd People's Assembly
←	2nd	4th	→

Overview
- Legislative body: People's Assembly
- Jurisdiction: Syria
- Meeting place: People's Assembly Building, Damascus
- Term: 16 November 1981 – 15 November 1985
- Election: 1981
- Government: al-Kasm I (until 11 March 1984); al-Kasm II (11 March 1984 – 7 April 1985); al-Kasm III (from 8 April 1985)
- Members: 195
- Speaker: Mahmoud al-Zoubi (Ba'ath Party)

Sessions
- 1st: 16 November – 30 December 1981
- 2nd: 15 February – 31 March 1982
- 3rd: 15 May – 30 June 1982
- 4th: 5 October – 30 December 1982
- 5th: 15 February – 31 March 1983
- 6th: 15 May – 30 June 1983
- 7th: 4 October – 29 December 1983
- 8th: 15 February – 30 March 1984
- 9th: 15 May – 30 June 1984
- 10th: 2 October – 30 December 1984
- 11th: 15 February – 31 March 1985
- 12th: 15 May – 29 June 1985
- 13th: 1 October – 14 November 1985

Special sessions
- 1st: 25 January – 10 February 1982
- 2nd: 22 January – 10 February 1985

The Third People's Assembly of Syria (Arabic: مجلس الشعب للدور التشريعي الثالث, romanized: Majlis al-Shaʻb lil-dawr al-tashrīʻī al-thālith) was the third legislature elected under the 1973 Constitution, serving from 16 November 1981 to 15 November 1985.

Legislative elections were held on 10 November 1981, marking the third parliamentary elections conducted under the Corrective Movement led by Hafez al-Assad. The Assembly convened for its first session on 16 November 1981 with a total of 195 members, including 13 women, representing the Arab Socialist Ba'ath Party, the Syrian Communist Party (Bakdash), the Arab Socialist Union, the Socialist Unionists, the Arab Socialist Movement, and independents.

During its inaugural session, the Assembly elected Mahmoud al-Zoubi as Speaker and proceeded to elect the members of its bureau. On the same day, President Hafez al-Assad delivered an address before the Assembly, emphasizing the importance of strengthening its oversight role and the obligation of all branches of government to fulfill their constitutional duties.

== Bureau ==
Position	Name	Party	Tenure
Speaker	Mahmoud al-Zoubi	Ba'ath Party	16 November 1981 – 15 November 1985
Deputy Speaker	Ali Rida		16 November 1981 – 15 November 1985
Secretary	Munif Shukri		16 November 1981 – 15 November 1985
Secretary	Muhammad Nazim Qaddour		16 November 1981 – 15 November 1985
Overseer	Ghassan al-Abd al-Rajab		16 November 1981 – 15 November 1985
Overseer	Yassin Otabashi		16 November 1981 – 15 November 1985

== Major legislations ==
- Law No. 15 of 11 July 1982 establishing the Ministry of Construction and Development
- Law No. 16 of 11 July 1982 establishing the Ministry of Irrigation
- Law No. 1 of 2 January 1985 concerning the Basic Law for State Employees
