= 2nd People's Assembly of Syria (1977–1981) =

Legislative term of Syria's parliament from 1977 to 1981

2nd People's Assembly
←	1st	3rd	→

Overview
- Legislative body: People's Assembly
- Jurisdiction: Syria
- Meeting place: People's Assembly Building, Damascus
- Term: 18 August 1977 – 17 August 1981
- Election: 1977
- Government: Khleifawi II (until 30 March 1978); al-Halabi (30 March 1978 – 14 January 1980); al-Kasm I (from 14 January 1980)
- Members: 195
- Speaker: Muhammad Ali al-Halabi (Ba'ath Party) (until 27 March 1978); Mahmoud Hadid (Ba'ath Party) (from 30 March 1978)

Sessions
- 1st: 4 October – 31 December 1977
- 2nd: 15 February – 29 March 1978
- 3rd: 15 May – 28 June 1978
- 4th: 3 October – 30 December 1978
- 5th: 15 February – 31 March 1979
- 6th: 15 May – 30 June 1979
- 7th: 2 October – 31 December 1979
- 8th: 15 February – 30 March 1980
- 9th: 15 May – 30 June 1980
- 10th: 7 October – 30 December 1980
- 11th: 15 February – 30 March 1981
- 12th: ? – ?

Special sessions
- 1st: 18 August – 26 September 1977
- 2nd: 20 January – 4 February 1979
- 3rd: 12–25 July 1981

The Second People's Assembly (Arabic: مجلس الشعب للدور التشريعي الثاني, romanized: Majlis al-Shaʻb lil-dawr al-tashrīʻī al-thānī) was the second legislature elected under the 1973 Constitution, serving from 18 August 1977 to 17 August 1981.

Legislative elections were held on 2 August 1977, marking the second parliamentary elections conducted under the Corrective Movement led by Hafez al-Assad. The Assembly convened for its first session on 18 August 1977 with a total of 195 members, including six women, representing the Arab Socialist Ba'ath Party, the Syrian Communist Party (Bakdash), the Arab Socialist Union, the Socialist Unionists, the Arab Socialist Movement, and independents.

During its inaugural session, the Assembly elected Muhammad Ali al-Halabi as Speaker and proceeded to elect the members of its bureau. On the same day, President Hafez al-Assad delivered an address marking the opening of the legislative term.

== Bureau ==
Position	Name	Party	Tenure
Speaker	Muhammad Ali al-Halabi	Ba'ath Party	18 August 1977 – 29 March 1978
Speaker	Mahmoud Hadid	Ba'ath Party	30 March 1978 – 17 August 1981
Deputy Speaker	Muhammad Adel Jamous		18 August 1977 – 17 August 1981
Secretary	Said Suleiman		18 August 1977 – 17 August 1981
Secretary	Tawfiq al-Naqri		18 August 1977 – 17 August 1981
Overseer	Muhammad Nadhir Dweidri		18 August 1977 – 17 August 1981
Overseer	Muhammad Wafiq Arnous		18 August 1977 – 17 August 1981

== Major Legislation ==
On 21 June 1980, the Assembly approved Law No. 37 adopting the official emblem of the Syrian Arab Republic, which was subsequently published in the Official Gazette.
