= 5th People's Assembly of Syria =

Legislative term of Syria's parliament from 1990 to 1994

5th People's Assembly
←	4th	6th	→

Overview
- Legislative body: People's Assembly
- Jurisdiction: Syria
- Meeting place: People's Assembly Building, Damascus
- Term: 11 June 1990 – 10 June 1994
- Election: 1990
- Government: al-Zoubi I (until 29 June 1992); al-Zoubi II (from 29 June 1992)
- Members: 250
- Speaker: Abd al-Qadir Qaddura (Ba'ath Party)

Sessions
- 1st: 11–30 June 1990
- 2nd: 2 October – 31 December 1990
- 3rd: 15 February – 31 March 1991
- 4th: ? – ?
- 5th: 1 October – 31 December 1991
- 6th: 15 February – 30 March 1992
- 7th: 15 May – 30 June 1992
- 8th: 7 October – 31 December 1992
- 9th: 15 February – 31 March 1993
- 10th: 15 May – 30 June 1993
- 11th: 5 October – 30 December 1993
- 12th: 15 February – 30 March 1994
- 13th: 15 May – 9 June 1994

Special sessions
- 1st: 20 April – 25 May 1991
- 2nd: 27 April – 9 May 1992
- 3rd: 20 April – 2 May 1993

The Fifth People's Assembly of Syria (Arabic: مجلس الشعب للدور التشريعي الخامس, romanized: Majlis al-Shaʻb lil-dawr al-tashrīʻī al-khāmis) was the fifth legislature elected under the 1973 Constitution, serving from 11 June 1990 to 10 June 1994.

Legislative elections were held on 23 May 1990, marking the fifth parliamentary elections conducted under the Corrective Movement led by Hafez al-Assad. The Assembly convened for its first session on 11 June 1990 with a total of 246 members, including 24 women, representing the Arab Socialist Ba'ath Party, the Syrian Communist Party (Bakdash), the Syrian Communist Party (Unified), the Arab Socialist Union, the Socialist Unionists, the Democratic Socialist Unionist Party, the Arab Socialist Movement, and independents.

During its inaugural session, the Assembly elected Abd al-Qadir Qaddura as Speaker and proceeded to elect the members of its bureau. On the same day, President Hafez al-Assad delivered an address before the Assembly marking the opening of the legislative term.

== Bureau ==
Position	Name	Party	Tenure
Speaker	Abd al-Qadir Qaddura	Ba'ath Party	11 June 1990 – 10 June 1994
Deputy Speaker	Muhammad Adel Jamous		11 June 1990 – 10 June 1994
Secretary	Muhammad Saad		11 June 1990 – 10 June 1994
Secretary	Muhammad Shams al-Din Qanout		11 June 1990 – 10 June 1994
Overseer	Ghassan al-Abd al-Rajab		11 June 1990 – 10 June 1994
Overseer	Muhammad Marwan Sheikho		11 June 1990 – 10 June 1994
