= 6th People's Assembly of Syria =

Legislative term of Syria's parliament from 1994 to 1998

6th People's Assembly
←	5th	7th	→

Overview
- Legislative body: People's Assembly
- Jurisdiction: Syria
- Meeting place: People's Assembly Building, Damascus
- Term: 10 September 1994 – 9 September 1998
- Election: 1994
- Government: al-Zoubi II
- Members: 250
- Speaker: Abd al-Qadir Qaddura (Ba'ath Party)

Sessions
- 1st: 10 September 1994 – ?
- 2nd: ? – ?
- 3rd: ? – ?
- 4th: ? – ?
- 5th: ? – ?
- 6th: ? – ?
- 7th: ? – ?
- 8th: ? – ?
- 9th: ? – ?
- 10th: ? – ?
- 11th: ? – ?
- 12th: ? – 9 September 1998

Special sessions
- 1st: ? – ?
- 2nd: ? – ?
- 3rd: ? – ?

The Sixth People's Assembly of Syria (Arabic: مجلس الشعب للدور التشريعي السادس, romanized: Majlis al-Shaʻb lil-dawr al-tashrīʻī al-sādis) was the sixth legislature elected under the 1973 Constitution, serving from 10 September 1994 to 9 September 1998.

Legislative elections were held on 24 August 1994, marking the sixth parliamentary elections conducted under the Corrective Movement led by Hafez al-Assad. The Assembly convened for its first session on 10 September 1994 with a total of 250 members, including 24 women, representing the Arab Socialist Ba'ath Party, the Syrian Communist Party (Bakdash), the Syrian Communist Party (Unified), the Arab Socialist Union, the Socialist Unionists, the Democratic Socialist Unionist Party, the Arab Socialist Movement, and independents.

During its inaugural session, the Assembly elected Abd al-Qadir Qaddura as Speaker and proceeded to elect the members of its bureau. On the same day, President Hafez al-Assad delivered an opening address to the Assembly, outlining the priorities for the legislative term.

== Bureau ==
Position	Name	Party	Tenure
Speaker	Abd al-Qadir Qaddura	Ba'ath Party	10 September 1994 – 9 September 1998
Deputy Speaker	Muhammad Adel Jamous		10 September 1994 – 9 September 1998
Secretary	Muhammad Saad		10 September 1994 – 9 September 1998
Secretary	Muhammad Nihad Mishantat		10 September 1994 – 9 September 1998
Overseer	Ismail Abd al-Ghani		10 September 1994 – 9 September 1998
Overseer	Muhammad Marwan Sheikho		10 September 1994 – 9 September 1998
