= First Abdul Rauf al-Kasm government =

1980–1984 Syrian government

- 81st government of the Syrian Arab Republic

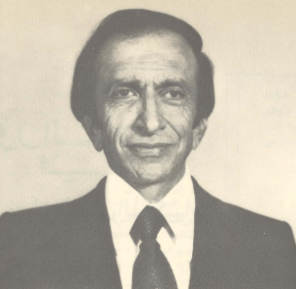
- Date formed: 14 January 1980
- Date dissolved: 11 March 1984

People and organisations
- President: Hafez al-Assad
- Prime Minister: Abdul Rauf al-Kasm
- Deputy Prime Ministers: Abdul Halim Khaddam; Walid Hamdoun; Abdul Qadir Qaddura
- Total no. of members: 35
- Member parties: ▌Ba'ath; ▌ASU; ▌SCP; ▌ASM; ▌SUP
- Status in legislature: Majority coalition government

History
- Election: 1981
- Legislature terms: 2nd and 3rd People's Assemblies
- Predecessor: al-Halabi
- Successor: al-Kasm II

The First Abdul Rauf al-Kasm government was the eighty-first government since the establishment of the modern Syrian state in 1918. Formed on 14 January 1980 by Decree No. 3, it was the fifth government to serve under the presidency of Hafez al-Assad. The government was headed by Abdul Rauf al-Kasm and remained in office until 11 March 1984.

The government was formed shortly after the conclusion of the Seventh Regional Congress of the Arab Socialist Ba'ath Party on 6 January 1980. President Hafez al-Assad's decision to appoint al-Kasm as Prime Minister came as a surprise to members of the party leadership, as al-Kasm had reportedly expected only to be appointed Minister of Housing. According to accounts by Regional Command member Walid Hamdoun, al-Assad unexpectedly proposed al-Kasm to head the new government during discussions on the government's formation.

The government presided over one of the most turbulent periods of Hafez al-Assad's presidency, marked by the escalation of the Islamist insurgency in Syria, continued Syrian involvement in the Lebanese Civil War, and the consolidation of state authority. It remained in office for more than four years before being succeeded by a second government headed by al-Kasm on 11 March 1984.

== Composition ==
Portfolio	Minister	Took office	Left office	Party
Prime Minister	Abdul Rauf al-Kasm	14 January 1980	11 March 1984	Ba'ath Party
Deputy Prime Minister	Abdul Halim Khaddam	21 November 1970	11 March 1984	Ba'ath Party
Deputy Prime Minister for Services Affairs	Walid Hamdoun	14 January 1980	11 March 1984	Ba'ath Party
Deputy Prime Minister for Economical Affairs	Abdul Qadir Qaddura	14 January 1980	11 March 1984	Ba'ath Party
Minister of Foreign Affairs	Abdul Halim Khaddam	21 November 1970	11 March 1984	Ba'ath Party
Minister of Defense	Mustafa Tlass	22 March 1972	11 March 1984	Ba'ath Party
Minister of Information	Ahmad Iskandar Ahmad	1 September 1974	11 March 1984	Ba'ath Party
Minister of Interior	Nasser al-Din Nasser	7 August 1976	11 March 1984	Ba'ath Party
Minister of Supply and Internal Trade	Muhammad Ghabbash	7 August 1976	11 March 1984	Ba'ath Party
Minister of Local Administration	Adnan Dabbagh	14 January 1980	11 March 1984	
Minister of Electricity	Ahmad Omar Youssef	7 August 1976	11 March 1984	
Minister of Education	Muhammad Najib al-Sayid Ahmad	14 January 1980	11 March 1984	Ba'ath Party
Minister of Presidential Affairs	Abd al-Karim Zuhur Addi	14 January 1980	11 March 1984	
Minister of Higher Education	Asaad Darqawi	14 January 1980	11 March 1984	
Minister of State	Omar al-Sibai	14 January 1980	3 December 1981	Syrian Communist Party
Minister of State	Anwar al-Hamadi	14 January 1980	3 December 1981	ASU
Minister of State	Nayef Te'ani	14 January 1980	11 March 1984	
Minister of State	Mikhail Naqqul	14 January 1980	11 March 1984	
Minister of State	Ahmad Salim Darwish	14 January 1980	3 December 1981	
Minister of State	Ramadan Hadla	14 January 1980	3 December 1981	
Minister of State	Daoud Hido	3 December 1981	11 March 1984	
Minister of State	Deeb al-Masri	3 December 1981	11 March 1984	
Minister of State	Hikmat Beyazid	3 December 1981	11 March 1984	
Minister of Culture	Najah al-Attar	7 August 1972	11 March 1984	
Minister of Transport	Muharram Tayyara	14 January 1980	3 December 1981	
Minister of Transport	Younnes Muhammad	3 December 1981	11 March 1984	
Minister of Social Affairs and Labour	Youssef Je'edani	30 March 1978	11 March 1984	ASU
Minister of State for Planning Affairs	Salim Yasin	14 January 1980	3 December 1981	
Minister of State for Planning Affairs	Kamal Sharaf	3 December 1981	11 March 1984	
Minister of Economy and Foreign Trade	Mohammad al-Atrash	14 January 1980	11 March 1984	
Minister of Oil and Mineral Resources	Abdul-Jabbar al-Dahhak	14 January 1980	11 March 1984	
Minister of Industry	Hussein al-Qadi	14 January 1980	3 December 1981	
Minister of Industry	Mahmoud Qaddour	3 December 1981	11 March 1984	
Minister of Finance	Hamdi al-Saqqa	14 January 1980	11 March 1984	
Minister of State for Foreign Affairs	Farouk al-Sharaa	14 January 1980	11 March 1984	Ba'ath Party
Minister of Housing and Utilities	Nawras al-Diqir	14 January 1980	3 December 1981	
Minister of Housing and Utilities	Ahmad Salim Darwish	3 December 1981	11 March 1984	
Minister of Justice	Khalid al-Maliki	14 January 1980	11 March 1984	
Minister of Agriculture and Agrarian Reform	Hamid Mesoukar	14 January 1980	3 December 1981	
Minister of Agriculture and Agrarian Reform	Ammash Jedea	3 December 1981	11 March 1984	
Minister of the Euphrates Dam	Yahya al-Khayer	14 January 1980	3 December 1981	Ba'ath Party
Minister of the Euphrates Dam	Abdul-Rahman Madani	3 December 1981	11 March 1984	
Minister of Transportation	Raafat al-Kurdi	14 January 1980	11 March 1984	
Minister of Health	Ghassoub al-Refai	14 January 1980	11 March 1984	
Minister of Public Works and Water Resources	Nayef Jarbou	14 January 1980	11 March 1984	
Minister of Endowments	Muhammad al-Khatib	14 January 1980	11 March 1984	
Minister of Tourism	George Radwan	14 January 1980	3 December 1981	
Minister of Tourism	Nawras al-Diqir	3 December 1981	11 March 1984	
Minister of State for Council of Ministers Affairs	Antouan Jubran	3 December 1981	11 March 1984	

== See also ==
- Council of Ministers (Syria)
- List of Syrian governments
- Government ministries of Syria
- List of prime ministers of Syria
