= Appointed People's Assembly =

Legislative term of Syria's parliament from 1971 to 1973

Appointed Assembly
←	NRC	1st	→

Overview
- Legislative body: People's Assembly
- Jurisdiction: Syria
- Meeting place: People's Assembly Building, Damascus
- Term: 22 February 1971 – 21 March 1973
- Election: Appointed by the President
- Government: al-Assad (until 3 April 1971); Khleifawi I (3 April 1971 – 23 December 1972); M. al-Ayyubi (from 23 December 1972)
- Members: 173
- Speaker: Ahmad al-Khatib (Ba'ath Party) (until 26 December 1971); Fahmi al-Yusufi (Ba'ath Party) (from 27 December 1971)

Sessions
- 1st: 22 February – 27 March 1971
- 2nd: 15 May – 30 June 1971
- 3rd: 5 October – 30 December 1971
- 4th: 15 February – 27 March 1972
- 5th: 15 May – 26 June 1972
- 6th: 3 October – 30 December 1972
- 7th: 17 February – 21 March 1973

Special sessions
- 1st: 29 August – 14 September 1971
- 2nd: 7–20 January 1973

The People's Assembly (Arabic: مجلس الشعب, romanized: Majlis al-Shaʻb), also known as The Appointed Assembly (Arabic: مجلس التعيين, romanized: Majlis al-Taʻyīn), or the Appointment Term (Arabic: دور التعيين, romanized: Dawr al-Taʻyīn), was the first People's Assembly of Syria established following the Corrective Movement led by Hafez al-Assad.

Formed by Legislative Decree No. 466 on 19 February 1971, the assembly consisted of 173 appointed members representing a range of political parties, including the Arab Socialist Ba'ath Party, the Syrian Communist Party, the Arab Socialist Union, the Socialist Unionists, the Arab Socialist Movement, and independents.

The Appointed People's Assembly served as a transitional legislative body that laid the foundations for Syria's modern parliamentary system under Ba'athist rule. Its most significant achievement was the preparation and adoption of the 1973 Constitution, which remained in force until 2012.

The assembly was succeeded by the 1st elected People's Assembly following the implementation of the new electoral law in 1973, marking the beginning of a new phase of parliamentary life in Syria.

== Background ==
Following the 1966 coup and subsequent suspension of constitutional life, Syria remained without a permanent constitution for several years. During the time, two provisional were adopted, in 1964 and 1969.

On 19 February 1971, Legislative Decree No. 466 established a new People's Assembly composed entirely of appointed members. The decree fixed the membership at 173 deputies and called the assembly to convene on 22 February 1971 in Damascus.

== Bureau ==
Position	Name	Party	Tenure
Speaker	Ahmad al-Khatib	Ba'ath Party	22 February – 26 December 1971
Speaker	Fahmi al-Youssefi	Ba'ath Party	27 December 1971 – 21 March 1973
Deputy Speaker	Adham Mustafa		22 February 1971 – 21 March 1973
Secretary	Muhammad Issam al-Naib		22–21 February 1971
Secretary	Taha Haddad		22–21 February 1971
Secretary	Nasr Zarif		22 February 1972 – 21 March 1973
Secretary	Ghassan Shalhoub		22 February 1972 – 21 March 1973
Overseer	Hussein Battikha		22–21 February 1971
Overseer	Wafiq al-Ayyubi		22 February 1971 – 21 March 1973
Overseer	Abd al-Majid Bali		22 February 1972 – 21 March 1973

== Activities ==
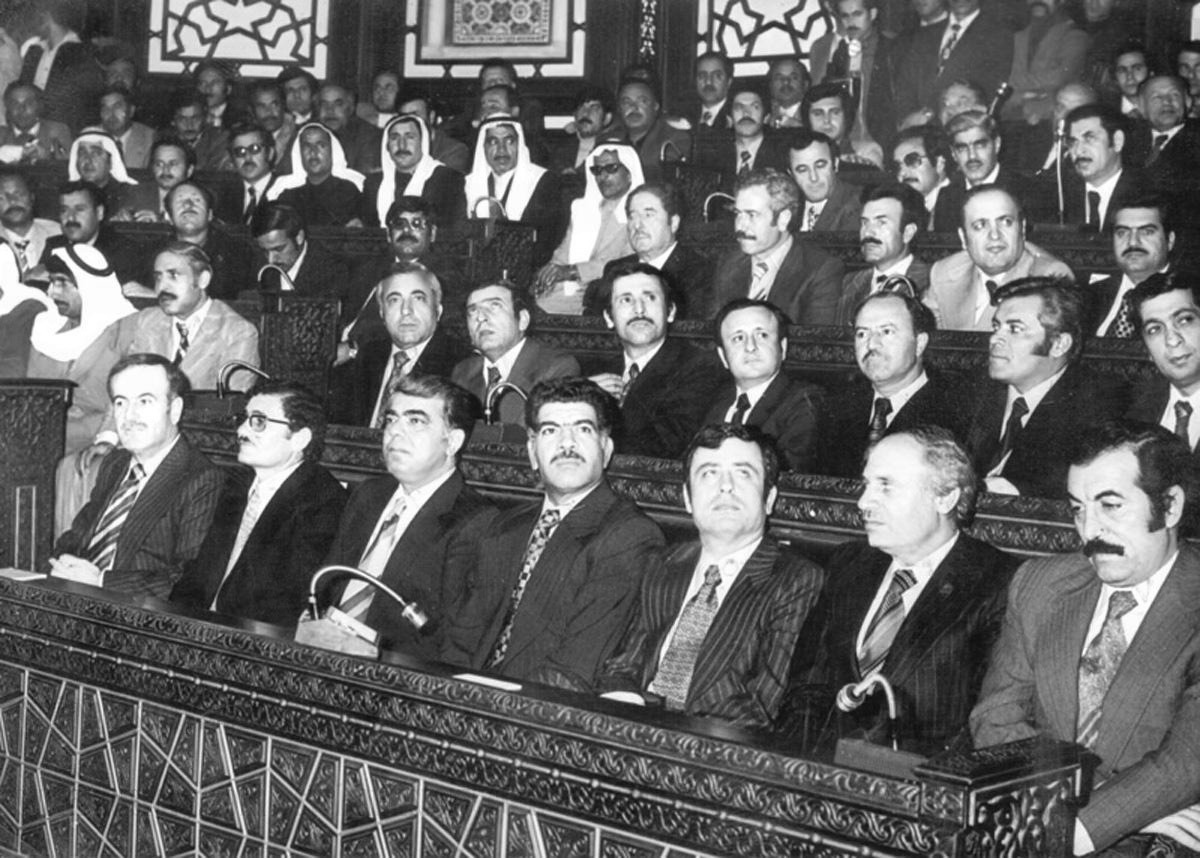
The first inauguration of President Hafez al-Assad in the People's Assembly (March 1971)

The assembly played a central role in the re-establishment of constitutional governance in Syria. One of its earliest actions was to endorse the nomination of Hafez al-Assad for the presidency, following a proposal by the Ba'ath Party leadership. A referendum held on 12 March 1971 confirmed his election as President.

The assembly also participated in regional political developments, including the announcement in Benghazi on 17 April 1971 of the proposed Federation of Arab Republics between Syria, Egypt, and Libya.

== Major legislations ==
- Drafting and approval of the Syrian Constitution of 1973, adopted by referendum on 12 March 1973 and promulgated on 13 March 1973. The 1973 Constitution defined Syria as a socialist state and formalized the leading role of the Ba'ath Party in society and the state. It also established the legislative and oversight functions of the People's Assembly within a more institutionalized political system.
- Promulgation of the Literacy Law (Law No. 7 of 7 March 1972)
- Promulgation of the Law Regulating the Legal Profession (Law No. 14 of 22 April 1972)

== National Progressive Front ==
On 7 March 1972, the assembly witnessed the formation of the National Progressive Front, a coalition of political parties led by the Ba'ath Party. The Front brought together several parties, including the Syrian Communist Party, the Arab Socialist Union, and other socialist and nationalist groups, within a controlled multi-party framework.

This development marked the institutionalization of political pluralism under Ba'athist leadership.
