= 7th People's Assembly of Syria =

Legislative term of Syria's parliament from 1998 to 2002

7th People's Assembly
←	6th	8th	→

Overview
- Legislative body: People's Assembly
- Jurisdiction: Syria
- Meeting place: People's Assembly Building, Damascus
- Term: 17 December 1998 – 16 December 2002
- Election: 1998
- Government: al-Zoubi II (until 13 March 2000); Mero I (13 March 2000 – 13 December 2001); Mero II (from 13 December 2001)
- Members: 250
- Speaker: Abd al-Qadir Qaddura (Ba'ath Party)

Sessions
- 1st: 17 December 1998 – ?
- 2nd: ? – ?
- 3rd: ? – ?
- 4th: ? – ?
- 5th: ? – ?
- 6th: ? – ?
- 7th: ? – ?
- 8th: ? – ?
- 9th: ? – ?
- 10th: ? – ?
- 11th: ? – ?
- 12th: ? –?
- 13th: ? – 16 December 2002

Special sessions
- 1st: ? – ?
- 2nd: ? – ?
- 3rd: ? – ?
- 4th: ? – ?
- 5th: ? – ?

The Seventh People's Assembly (Arabic: مجلس الشعب للدور التشريعي السابع, romanized: Majlis al-Shaʿb lil-dawr al-tashrīʿī al-sābiʿ) was the seventh legislative term of the People's Assembly of Syria.

Legislative elections were held on 30 November and 1 December 1998. The newly elected assembly, composed of 248 members including 26 women, convened for its first session on 17 December 1998. Its membership represented the parties of the National Progressive Front, including the Arab Socialist Ba'ath Party, the Syrian Communist Party and its splinter factions, the Arab Socialist Union, the Socialist Unionists, the Democratic Socialist Unionists, the Arab Socialist Movement, as well as independent deputies.

At its inaugural session, the assembly elected Abd al-Qadir Qaddura as Speaker, along with the members of its bureau. During the term, changes occurred within the bureau, including the replacement of a secretary following his appointment as Minister of Construction and Development in April 2000, and the election of a new overseer in December 2001 after the death of the incumbent.

== Bureau ==
Position	Name	Party	Tenure
Speaker	Abd al-Qadir Qaddura	Ba'ath Party	17 December 1998 – 16 December 2002
Deputy Speaker	Abdallah Mousalli		17 December 1998 – 16 December 2002
Secretary	Muhammad Saad		17 December 1998 – 16 December 2002
Secretary	Muhammad Nihad Mishantat		17 December 1998 – 24 April 2000
Secretary	Ahmad al-Ahmad		25 April 2000 – 16 December 2002
Overseer	Abd al-Razzaq al-Awwad		17 December 1998 – 16 December 2002
Overseer	Muhammad Marwan Sheikho		17 December 1998 – 22 December 2001
Overseer	Hassan al-Nouri		23 December 2001 – 16 December 2002

== International work ==
The assembly also played a role in regional and international parliamentary cooperation. It contributed to the establishment of the Parliamentary Union of the OIC Member States in 1999 and participated in the founding of the Asian Parliamentary Assembly later that year, aimed at strengthening regional cooperation and democratic institutions across Asia.

== Bashar al-Assad's Era ==
A major turning point during this legislative term came in June 2000, when Hafez al-Assad died. It subsequently formed a special committee to amend Article 83 of the constitution, to change the minimum age of the President from 40 to 34. Later that month, the assembly received a nomination from the Ba'ath Party leadership for Bashar al-Assad as President. A parliamentary committee was formed to study the nomination, and on 27 June 2000 the assembly unanimously approved it.

A referendum was held on 10 July 2000, in which Bashar al-Assad was elected President. He took the constitutional oath before the assembly on 17 July 2000.
