= Mahmoud al-Ayyubi government =

1972–1976 Syrian government

- 78th government of the Syrian Arab Republic

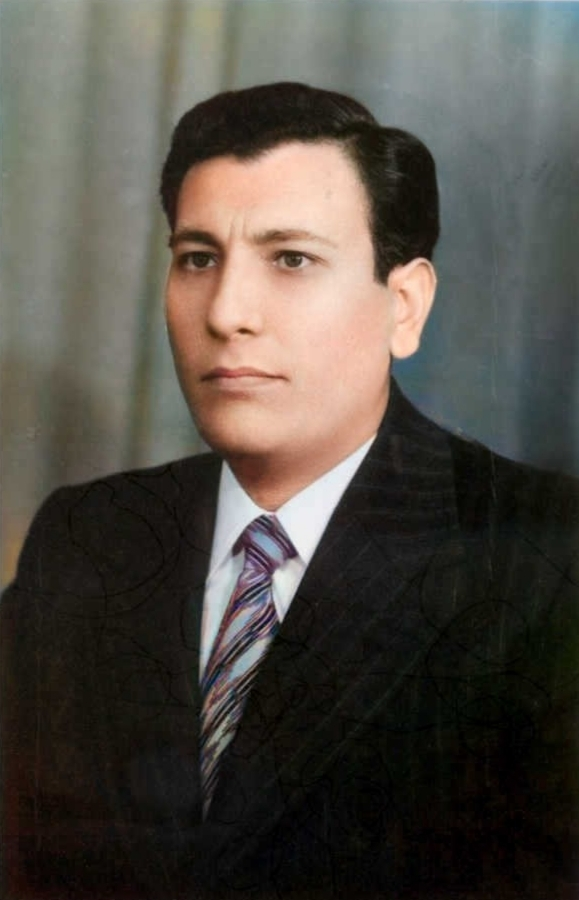
- Date formed: 23 December 1972
- Date dissolved: 7 August 1976

People and organisations
- President: Hafez al-Assad
- Prime Minister: Mahmoud al-Ayyubi
- Deputy Prime Ministers: Abdul Halim Khaddam; Muhammad Haidar
- Member parties: ▌Ba'ath; ▌ASU; ▌SCP; ▌ASM; ▌SUP; ▌DASU
- Status in legislature: Majority coalition government

History
- Election: 1973
- Legislature terms: Appointed and 1st People's Assemblies
- Predecessor: Khleifawi I
- Successor: Khleifawi II

The Mahmoud al-Ayyubi government was the seventy-eighth government since the establishment of the modern Syrian state in 1918. Formed on 23 December 1972 by Decree No. 2534, it was the second government to serve under the presidency of Hafez al-Assad. The government was headed by Mahmoud al-Ayyubi and remained in office until 7 August 1976.

The government was established during the consolidation of Hafez al-Assad's rule and was responsible for implementing the policies of the Arab Socialist Ba'ath Party under the framework of the 1973 Constitution. It presided over a period in which the Syrian government sought to strengthen state institutions, expand the public sector, and reinforce the political system established following the Corrective Movement.

Remaining in office for more than three and a half years, the Mahmoud al-Ayyubi government was one of the longest-serving cabinets of the early Assad era. It was succeeded on 7 August 1976 by a new government headed by Abdul Rahman Khleifawi.

== Composition ==
Portfolio	Minister	Took office	Left office	Party
Prime Minister	Mahmoud al-Ayyubi	23 December 1972	7 August 1976	Ba'ath Party
Deputy Prime Minister	Abdul Halim Khaddam	21 November 1970	7 August 1976	Ba'ath Party
Deputy Prime Minister	Muhammad Haidar	23 December 1972	26 September 1973	Ba'ath Party
Deputy Prime Minister for Economical Affairs	Muhammad Haidar	26 September 1973	7 August 1976	Ba'ath Party
Minister of Foreign Affairs	Abdul Halim Khaddam	21 November 1970	7 August 1976	Ba'ath Party
Minister of Agriculture and Agrarian Reform	Muhammad Haidar	3 April 1971	26 September 1973	Ba'ath Party
Minister of Agriculture and Agrarian Reform	Ahmad al-Asaad	26 September 1973	1 September 1974	
Minister of Agriculture and Agrarian Reform	Mursil Abu Omar	1 September 1974	7 August 1976	
Minister of Defense	Mustafa Tlass	22 March 1972	7 August 1976	Ba'ath Party
Minister of Local Administration	Adib Mulhem	23 December 1972	7 August 1976	
Minister of Public Works	Abd al-Ghani Qanut	23 December 1972	7 August 1976	Arab Socialist Movement
Minister of Water Resources	Abd al-Ghani Qanut	21 November 1970	7 August 1976	Arab Socialist Movement
Minister of Higher Education	Shakir al-Fahham	21 November 1970	26 September 1973	Ba'ath Party
Minister of Higher Education	Muhammad Ali Hashem	26 September 1973	7 August 1976	
Minister of State	Fayez Ismail	21 November 1970	26 September 1973	Socialist Unionist
Minister of State	Muhammad Ali Hashem	23 December 1972	26 September 1973	
Minister of State	Zahir Abdul-Samad	23 December 1972	7 August 1976	
Minister of State	Abdul-Majid Manjuneh	22 March 1972	26 September 1973	Democratic Arab Socialist Union
Minister of State	Anwar al-Hamadi	26 September 1973	7 August 1976	ASU
Minister of Finance	Nourallah Nourallah	21 November 1970	7 August 1976	
Minister of Finance	Muhammad al-Sharif	1 September 1974	7 August 1976	
Minister of Culture and National Guidance	Fawzi Kayyali	22 March 1972	7 August 1976	ASU
Minister of State for Planning Affairs	Mustafa al-Hallaj	23 December 1972	1 September 1974	
Minister of State for Planning Affairs	Nourallah Nourallah	1 September 1974	7 August 1976	
Minister of Justice	Adib al-Nahwi	21 November 1970	7 August 1976	
Minister of Transportation	Omar al-Sibai	21 November 1970	7 August 1976	Syrian Communist Party
Minister of Transport	Numan al-Zein	1 September 1974	7 August 1976	
Minister of the Euphrates Dam	Munir Wannous	21 November 1970	1 September 1974	
Minister of the Euphrates Dam	Subhi Kahala	1 September 1974	7 August 1976	
Minister of Supply and Internal Trade	Ahmad Qablan	23 December 1972	7 August 1976	Ba'ath Party
Minister of Endowments	Abdul-Sattar al-Sayed	23 December 1972	7 August 1976	
Minister of Oil, Mineral Resources and Electricity	Fayez Nasser	23 December 1972	26 September 1973	Ba'ath Party
Minister of Oil, Mineral Resources and Electricity	Jabr al-Kufri	26 September 1973	1 September 1974	
Minister of Oil and Mineral Resources	Adnan Mustafa	1 September 1974	7 August 1976	
Minister of Electricity	Hani al-Sawwaf	1 September 1974	7 August 1976	
Minister of Interior	Ali Zaza	3 April 1971	7 August 1976	
Minister of State for Council of Ministers Affairs	Marwan Sabbagh	23 December 1972	26 September 1973	
Minister of State for Council of Ministers Affairs	Fayez Nasser	26 September 1973	7 August 1976	Ba'ath Party
Minister of Industry	Hassan al-Khatib	23 December 1972	26 September 1973	
Minister of Industry	Shtewi Seifo	26 September 1973	7 August 1976	
Minister of Information	Ahmad al-Asaad	22 March 1972	26 September 1973	
Minister of Information	George Sadaqni	26 September 1973	1 September 1974	
Minister of Information	Ahmad Iskandar Ahmad	1 September 1974	7 August 1976	Ba'ath Party
Minister of Economy and Foreign Trade	Muhammad al-Amadi	23 December 1972	7 August 1976	
Minister of State for Frontline Villages Affairs	Muyyad Jazan	23 December 1972	1 September 1974	
Minister of Social Affairs and Labour	Hussein Kuweidar	23 December 1972	7 August 1976	
Minister of Health	Madani al-Kheimi	23 December 1972	7 August 1976	
Minister of Tourism	Abdullah al-Khani	23 December 1972	7 August 1976	
Minister of Education	Hafez al-Jamali	23 December 1972	26 September 1973	
Minister of Education	Shakir al-Fahham	26 September 1973	7 August 1976	Ba'ath Party
Minister of Municipal and Rural Affairs	Abdul-Razzaq Abdul-Baqi	23 December 1972	1 September 1974	
Minister of Housing and Utilities	Ahmad al-Asaad	1 September 1974	7 August 1976	

== See also ==
- Council of Ministers (Syria)
- List of Syrian governments
- Government ministries of Syria
- List of prime ministers of Syria
