= 1st People's Assembly of Syria (1973–1977) =

Legislative term of Syria's parliament from 1973 to 1977

1st People's Assembly
←	Appointed	2nd	→

Overview
- Legislative body: People's Assembly
- Jurisdiction: Syria
- Meeting place: People's Assembly Building, Damascus
- Term: 9 June 1973 – 8 June 1977
- Election: 1973
- Government: M. al-Ayyubi (until 7 August 1976); Khleifawi II (from 7 August 1976)
- Members: 186
- Speaker: Muhammad Ali al-Halabi (Ba'ath Party)

Sessions
- 1st: 9–27 June 1973
- 2nd: 2 October – 31 December 1973
- 3rd: 16 February – 31 March 1974
- 4th: 15 May – 30 June 1974
- 5th: 1 October – 22 December 1974
- 6th: 15 February – 29 March 1975
- 7th: 15 May – 30 June 1975
- 8th: 11 October – 30 December 1975
- 9th: 15 February – 30 March 1976
- 10th: 15 May – 29 June 1976
- 11th: 5 October – 30 December 1976
- 12th: 15 February – 29 March 1977
- 13th: 15 May – 7 June 1977

Special sessions
- 1st: 2–5 February 1974
- 2nd: 3–10 April 1975
- 3rd: 22–28 September 1975

The First People's Assembly (Arabic: مجلس الشعب للدور التشريعي الأول, romanized: Majlis al-Shaʻb lil-dawr al-tashrīʻī al-awwal) was the first elected parliament of the Syria under the 1973 Constitution and the Corrective Movement led by Hafez al-Assad. It was also the first elected parliament since 1961.

== Background ==
Following the adoption of the 1973 Constitution and the issuance of the General Elections Law (Legislative Decree No. 26 of 14 April 1973), parliamentary elections were held on 25 and 26 May 1973. The results were ratified by Presidential Decree No. 1093 of 29 May 1973.

The assembly was formally convened by Presidential Decree No. 1094 on 9 June 1973. During its inaugural session, Hafez al-Assad delivered a keynote address outlining the political direction of the state under the new constitutional order.

== Bureau ==
Position	Name	Party	Tenure
Speaker	Muhammad Ali al-Halabi	Ba'ath Party	9 June 1973 – 8 June 1977
Deputy Speaker	Muhammad Adel Jamous		9 June 1973 – 8 June 1977
Secretary	Abd al-Nafi' al-Sibai		9 June 1973 – 8 June 1977
Secretary	Sarem Youssef		9 June 1973 – 8 June 1977
Secretary	Khalid al-Hamud		9 June 1973 – 8 June 1977
Secretary	Tawfiq al-Naqri		9 June 1973 – 8 June 1977
Overseer	Qusay al-Sheikh		9 June 1973 – 8 June 1977
Overseer	George Harika		9 June 1973 – 14 June 1974
Overseer	Fayez Issa		15 June 1974 – 8 June 1975
Overseer	Said Suleiman		9 June 1973 – 8 June 1977
Overseer	Hasan Jumaa		9 June 1973 – 8 June 1977

== Activities ==
President Hafez Assad addressing the People's Assembly in 1975

The First People's Assembly undertook extensive legislative work, reviewing approximately 440 laws and legislative decrees covering a wide range of political, economic, and social issues. Most of these were subsequently promulgated by the President.

On 6 October 1973, during the term of the assembly, Syria participated in the October War against Israel, marking a major event in the country's modern history.

== Parliamentary diplomacy ==
The assembly played a notable role in expanding Syria's parliamentary relations at the regional and international levels.

Between 19 and 21 June 1974, it participated in the establishment of the Arab Inter-Parliamentary Union, whose founding conference was held in Damascus (Bloudan). The city subsequently became the permanent headquarters of the organisation's General Secretariat.

In 1974, the assembly joined the Inter-Parliamentary Union, headquartered in Geneva, and began participating regularly in its biannual conferences, becoming an active member of the international parliamentary community.

== Role of women ==
Women were represented in the assembly, with five female deputies elected. On 5 October 1974, two women were elected to chair permanent committees: Hajar Sadiq as head of the Committee on Guidance and Information, and Salma Najib as head of the Committee on Arab and Foreign Affairs.

== Major legislations ==
- Law No. 33 of 21 December 1975 establishing the General Women's Union
