= First Abdul Rahman Khleifawi government =

1971–1972 Syrian government

- 77th government of the Syrian Arab Republic

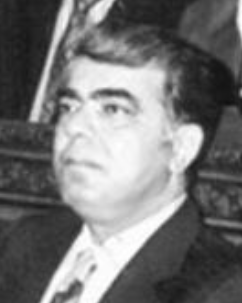
- Date formed: 3 April 1971
- Date dissolved: 23 December 1972

People and organisations
- President: Hafez al-Assad
- Prime Minister: Abdul Rahman Khleifawi
- Deputy Prime Ministers: Abdul Halim Khaddam; Muhammad Talab Hilal (until 22 March 1972)
- Total no. of members: 28 (until Mar 1972); 30 (from Mar 1972)
- Member parties: ▌Ba'ath; ▌ASU; ▌SCP; ▌ASM; ▌SUP; ▌DASU
- Status in legislature: Majority coalition government

History
- Legislature term: Appointed People's Assembly
- Predecessor: al-Assad
- Successor: M. al-Ayyubi

The First Abdul Rahman Khleifawi government was the seventy-seventh government since the establishment of the modern Syrian state in 1918. Formed on 3 April 1971 by Decree No. 941, it was the first government to serve under the presidency of Hafez al-Assad. The government was headed by Major General Abdul Rahman Khleifawi and remained in office until 23 December 1972.

The government was established shortly after Hafez al-Assad assumed the presidency, following the 1971 Syrian presidential election. Its principal role was to implement the new administration's political and economic programme while strengthening the institutions of the Ba'athist state under the new constitutional order.

As the first government of the Assad presidency, the government marked the beginning of a prolonged period of political continuity under Ba'ath Party rule. It remained in office until 23 December 1972, when it was succeeded by a second government headed by Abd al-Rahman Khulayfawi.

== Composition ==
Portfolio	Minister	Took office	Left office	Party
Prime Minister	Abdul Rahman Khleifawi	3 April 1971	23 December 1972	Ba'ath Party
Deputy Prime Minister	Muhammad Talab Hilal	21 November 1970	22 March 1972	Ba'ath Party
Deputy Prime Minister	Abdul Halim Khaddam	21 November 1970	23 December 1972	Ba'ath Party
Minister of Industry	Muhammad Talab Hilal	3 April 1971	22 March 1972	Ba'ath Party
Minister of Industry	Mut'eb Shanan	22 March 1972	23 December 1972	Ba'ath Party
Minister of Foreign Affairs	Abdul Halim Khaddam	21 November 1970	23 December 1972	Ba'ath Party
Minister of Agriculture and Agrarian Reform	Muhammad Haidar	3 April 1971	23 December 1972	Ba'ath Party
Minister of Supply and Internal Trade	Abd al-Karim Zuhur Addi	3 April 1971	23 December 1972	
Minister of Public Works	Abd al-Ghani Qanut	21 November 1970	23 December 1972	Arab Socialist Movement
Minister of Water Resources	Abd al-Ghani Qanut	21 November 1970	23 December 1972	Arab Socialist Movement
Minister of State for Planning Affairs	Sami Soufan	21 November 1970	22 March 1972	Socialist Unionist
Minister of State for Planning Affairs	Muhammad al-Amadi	22 March 1972	23 December 1972	
Minister of Higher Education	Shakir al-Fahham	21 November 1970	23 December 1972	Ba'ath Party
Minister of Oil, Mineral Resources and Electricity	Mustafa Haddad	21 November 1970	22 March 1972	
Minister of Oil, Mineral Resources and Electricity	Ahmad Abbara	22 March 1972	23 December 1972	
Minister of Finance	Nourallah Nourallah	21 November 1970	23 December 1972	
Minister of Culture, Tourism and National Guidance	Fawzi Kayyali	21 November 1970	22 March 1972	ASU
Minister of Culture and National Guidance	Fawzi Kayyali	22 March 1972	23 December 1972	ASU
Minister of Tourism	Ahmad Sheikh Said	22 March 1972	23 December 1972	
Minister of Municipal and Rural Affairs	Mahmoud Qanbaz	21 November 1970	23 December 1972	
Minister of Economy and Foreign Trade	Mustafa al-Hallaj	21 November 1970	23 December 1972	
Minister of Justice	Adib al-Nahwi	21 November 1970	23 December 1972	
Minister of Transportation	Omar al-Sibai	21 November 1970	23 December 1972	Syrian Communist Party
Minister of the Euphrates Dam	Munir Wannous	21 November 1970	23 December 1972	
Minister of Education	Adnan Baghjati	3 April 1971	22 March 1972	Ba'ath Party
Minister of Education	Hassan al-Khatib	22 March 1972	23 December 1972	
Minister of State for Frontline Villages Affairs	Ahmad Qabalan	21 November 1970	23 December 1972	Ba'ath Party
Minister of Defense	Mut'eb Shanan	3 April 1971	22 March 1972	Ba'ath Party
Minister of Defense	Mustafa Tlass	22 March 1972	23 December 1972	Ba'ath Party
Minister of Endowments	Abdul-Sattar al-Sayed	3 April 1971	23 December 1972	
Minister of Health	Mahmoud Saadeh	3 April 1971	23 December 1972	
Minister of Information	Fayez Nasser	3 April 1971	22 March 1972	
Minister of Information	Ahmad al-Asaad	22 March 1972	23 December 1972	
Minister of Interior	Ali Zaza	3 April 1971	23 December 1972	
Minister of Social Affairs and Labour	Marwan Sabbagh	3 April 1971	23 December 1972	
Minister of Local Administration	Jabr al-Kafri	22 March 1972	23 December 1972	
Minister of State for Council of Ministers Affairs	Fayez Nasser	22 March 1972	23 December 1972	
Minister of State	Daoud al-Radawi	3 April 1971	22 March 1972	
Minister of State	Ghalib Abdoun	3 April 1971	22 March 1972	
Minister of State	Fayez Ismail	21 November 1970	23 December 1972	Socialist Unionist
Minister of State	Youssef Faisal	3 April 1971	23 December 1972	Syrian Communist Party
Minister of State	Abdul-Majid Manjuneh	22 March 1972	23 December 1972	Democratic Arab Socialist Union

== See also ==
- Council of Ministers (Syria)
- List of Syrian governments
- Government ministries of Syria
- List of prime ministers of Syria
