= 8th People's Assembly of Syria =

Legislative term of Syria's parliament from 2003 to 2007

8th People's Assembly
| ← | 7th | 9th | → |

Overview
- Legislative body: People's Assembly
- Jurisdiction: Syria
- Meeting place: People's Assembly Building, Damascus
- Term: 9 March 2003 – 8 March 2007
- Election: 2003
- Government: Mero II (unti 18 September 2003); al-Otari (from 18 September 2003)
- Members: 250
- Speaker: Muhammad Naji al-Otari (Ba'ath Party) (until 18 September 2003); Mahmoud al-Abrash (Ba'ath Party) (from 7 October 2003)

Sessions
- 1st: 9 March 2003 – ?
- 2nd: ? – ?
- 3rd: ? – ?
- 4th: ? – ?
- 5th: ? – ?
- 6th: ? – ?
- 7th: ? – ?
- 8th: ? – ?
- 9th: ? – ?
- 10th: ? – ?
- 11th: ? – ?
- 12th: ? – ?
- 13th: ? – 8 March 2007

Special sessions
- 1st: ? – ?

The Eighth People's Assembly (Arabic: مجلس الشعب للدور التشريعي الثامن, romanized: Majlis al-Shaʿb lil-dawr al-tashrīʿī al-thāmin) was the eighth legislative term of the People's Assembly of Syria. It served from 9 March 2003 until 8 March 2007 and was the first parliament elected after Bashar al-Assad assumed the presidency.

== Elections ==
Legislative elections were held on 2–3 March 2003. The newly elected assembly, composed of 250 members including 30 women, convened for its first session on 9 March 2003.

Its membership represented the parties of the National Progressive Front, including the Arab Socialist Ba'ath Party, the Syrian Communist Party (Bakdash), the Syrian Communist Party (Unified), the Arab Socialist Union, the Socialist Unionists, the Democratic Socialist Unionist Party, the Arab Socialist Movement, the Arab Democratic Union Party, the Syrian Social Nationalist Party, the National Covenant Party, as well as independent deputies.

== Bureau ==
| Position | Name | Party | Tenure |
|---|---|---|---|
| Speaker | Muhammad Naji al-Otari | Ba'ath Party | 9 March – 18 September 2003 |
| Speaker | Mahmoud al-Abrash | Ba'ath Party | 7 October 2003 – 8 March 2007 |
| Deputy Speaker | Muhammad Issam al-Jammal | | 9 March – 18 September 2003 |
| Deputy Speaker | Nasser Qaddour | | 7 October 2003 – 8 March 2007 |
| Secretary | Muhammad Nihad Mishantat | | 9 March – 8 October 2003 |
| Secretary | Inam Abbas | | 9 March 2003 – 8 March 2007 |
| Secretary | Ahmad al-Shami | | 7 October 2003 – 8 March 2007 |
| Overseer | Muhammad al-Habash | Independent | 9 March 2003 – 8 March 2007 |
| Overseer | Haneen Nimr | Communist (Bakdash) | 9 March 2003 – 8 March 2007 |

== Legislative activity ==
During the broader period from 2000 to 2007, more than 1,200 laws, decrees, and administrative decisions were issued, contributing to reforms aimed at improving the business environment and transitioning Syria toward a social market economy under the Tenth Five-Year Plan (2006–2010).

In December 2005, the assembly held a notable session in which accusations of high treason were directed against former Vice President Abdul Halim Khaddam.

== International role ==
The assembly expanded its international parliamentary engagement through cooperation agreements and memoranda of understanding with several legislatures, including those of Lebanon, Colombia, Kazakhstan, Iran, France, Belarus, and Turkey.

It also strengthened ties with Asian and Arab parliamentary institutions. In cooperation with the Arab Inter-Parliamentary Union, it helped organise the Arab–Japanese parliamentary forums held in Damascus (2004), Tokyo (2005), and Amman (2007).

The assembly contributed to the establishment of the Arab Parliament, initially formed as a transitional body in 2005, with Damascus designated as its headquarters. It also cooperated with international organisations, including the United Nations Development Programme and the United Nations Population Fund, to enhance parliamentary capacity, legislative effectiveness, and engagement with social and demographic policy issues.
