= Electoral system of Syria =

The electoral system of Syria governs the election of the president, the People's Assembly (the national legislature), and local administrative councils. Syria's electoral law has changed repeatedly since the country's formation, moving from an indirect, two-stage colonial-era system through several direct majoritarian systems to the transitional arrangements introduced after the fall of the Assad regime in December 2024.

For most of Syria's history, the president was not directly elected by the public: under the First and Second Syrian Republic, the head of state was chosen by the sitting legislature, and under Ba'athist rule from 1971 until 2024, the president was confirmed by single-candidate referendum, with the exception of the 2014 and 2021 elections.

Direct, multi-candidate presidential elections were introduced only in 2014. Elections to the legislature, by contrast, have been held under several distinct systems: an indirect two-degree system (1928–1947), a direct district-based system (1947–1963), a governorate-based block-vote system (1973–2024), and, following the collapse of the Assad government, a transitional system based on locally selected electoral colleges (from 2025).

== Parliamentary elections ==
=== 1928 ===
The first electoral system to be applied in Syria after the end of Ottoman rule was introduced by Arrêté (Order) No. 1889, issued on 20 March 1928 by Henri Ponsot, the French High Commissioner for Syria and Lebanon, consolidating earlier decrees governing elections in the states of Damascus and Aleppo. The decree was introduced ahead of the Constituent Assembly election, and was retained for the 1931–32, 1936, 1937, and 1943 elections to the Chamber of Deputies Under this decree, elections were indirect and held on two degrees. Primary electors — Syrian men over the age of 20 — voted at the level of the village or urban quarter to choose "secondary electors", at a ratio of one secondary elector per 100 primary electors. The secondary electors then assembled at the level of the qadaa (district) to elect deputies by absolute majority. Seats were also reserved for religious minorities in proportion to their share of the electorate under Article 37 of the 1930 constitution, and for nomadic Bedouin tribes, whose representatives were chosen by tribal leaders rather than by election.

Article 21 set the conditions for candidates, who had to be first-degree electors in their district, at least 30 years old, and literate. The chamber initially had 68 deputies; this rose to 124 ahead of the 1943 election. The system was criticised at the time as entrenching regionalism, sectarianism and the dominance of established landowning families over political life, since secondary electors frequently failed to secure the votes needed to elect a deputy without accepting payment from candidates or coming under pressure from large landowners and other notables. Public pressure for a more representative system grew after independence in 1946; when a coalition of merchants, students and opposition politicians rejected a proposed compromise, demonstrations broke out in Damascus, Aleppo, Homs and Hama in April 1947, forcing the government of Jamil Mardam Bey to abandon the two-degree system in favour of direct elections.

=== 1947 ===
The system introduced by the government of Jamil Mardam Bey and first applied in the 1947 election replaced indirect voting with direct, single-round elections held in geographic districts, with cities generally forming single constituencies. This produced a mix of small, medium and large constituencies: 41 seats (24 per cent of the chamber) were elected in single- or near-single-member districts, 71 (41 per cent) in medium-sized districts, and 60 (35 per cent) in large districts such as Damascus and Aleppo, with representativeness weakening as district size increased. It has been described as the most accurate and representative of Syria's historical electoral systems. At its introduction, the franchise remained restricted to Syrian men over the age of 20, as it had been under the 1928 system.

=== 1949 ===
After Husni al-Za'im's coup and seizure of power in March 1949, he lowered the voting age to 18 and extended the franchise to women, and reduced the constitutional minority quota established in 1930 so that reserved seats applied only to non-Muslim communities (Christians and Jews) rather than to all sects proportionally.

The succeeding government of Hashim al-Atassi promulgated a new electoral law by legislative decree. It retained the 18-year voting age for men but narrowed the female franchise to literate women only, without extending candidacy rights to women. Under the 1950 constitution, women of any level of education gained the right to vote and to stand for election on equal terms with men; the first election held under this fully equal franchise took place in 1954. Bedouin tribal seats continued to be filled by tribal leaders rather than by direct voting.

=== 1953 ===
Adib Shishakli, who had taken full power in a coup in 1951, introduced a new electoral law under which the 1953 election was held. It was abandoned, along with the rest of his political programme, when he was overthrown in February 1954.

=== 1954 ===
The 1949 electoral law was restored by Law No. 188 of 1954. It was amended in 1957 to abolish the run-off (ballottage), so that the candidates with the most votes were elected outright. Voting was held from 07:00 to 20:00, with a 51 per cent turnout quorum per district; if the quorum was not met, voting continued into a second day and any turnout was then accepted.

The 1949 law was amended once again in 1961, raising the total number of seats in the Chamber of Deputies to 172 seats.

=== 1973 ===
The system in force since 1973 is based on the governorate as a single, at-large multi-member constituency, with each governorate's full slate of seats awarded by simple plurality; Aleppo alone is divided into two constituencies, one for the city of Aleppo and one for the governorate's other districts. Legislative Decree No. 26, issued by President Hafez al-Assad on 14 April 1973, established universal secret-ballot suffrage from the age of 18 for both sexes, with one vote per elector, and stipulated that at least 50 per cent of seats be reserved for the "workers and peasants" sector, with the remainder allocated to the "other sectors of the people". This quota did not have to be observed for the allocation of seats within an individual list. Candidates had to be at least 25 years old, literate, and vetted by government-appointed nomination committees.

The number of seats is not fixed by the law itself but set by presidential decree ahead of each election; it was raised from 186 to 195 in 1981, and from 195 to 250 in 1990, remaining unchanged up until the fall of the Ba'athist-led regime. The large-constituency, plurality-based design was retained even after it was discussed during the 2011 reform process (see § 2011), and has been criticised as unrepresentative.

=== 2011 ===
Legislative Decree No. 101, issued on 24 August 2011 amidst the early stages of the Syrian civil war, replaced the 1973 decree with a new General Elections Law covering both the People's Assembly and local administrative councils. Its principal innovation was the creation of a Supreme Committee for Elections, an independent judicial body of five members of the Court of Cassation appointed for non-renewable four-year terms, together with subordinate judicial committees in each governorate, to administer and supervise elections. The law retained the governorate-based constituency structure and the workers'-and-farmers' quota of the 1973 system, while extending the same framework to elections for governorate, city and local councils, and referred campaign finance to the separate Law No. 66 of 2006.

=== 2014 ===
Law No. 5 of 2014, promulgated by President Bashar al-Assad on 24 March 2014, was a comprehensive General Elections Law covering the presidency, the People's Assembly, local administrative councils and national referendums. Its most significant change was the introduction, for the first time, of direct popular election of the president by multiple candidates, replacing the single-candidate referendum system used since 1971 (see § Presidential elections). The law also replaced the Supreme Committee for Elections with a renamed Supreme Judicial Committee for Elections of seven judges, operating under the supervision of the Supreme Constitutional Court for presidential elections, and introduced a General Electoral Register maintained by the Ministry of Interior. The workers'-and-farmers' quota and governorate-based constituency structure for the People's Assembly were carried over largely unchanged from the 1973 and 2011 systems.

=== 2025 ===
Following the fall of the Ba'athist-led regime in December 2024, a transitional electoral decree was issued for the election of the People's Assembly, establishing a new and substantially different mechanism. The assembly was set at 210 members, of whom two-thirds (140 seats) are elected under the decree; the remaining third is filled by presidential appointment rather than election. Elections are indirect: in each electoral district, a Subcommittee for Elections, in consultation with local civic and official figures, selects an "electoral college" of local citizens, whose size is set at 50 times the district's seat allocation (or, failing that, no fewer than 30). Only members of these electoral colleges may stand as candidates for the assembly seats allocated to their district.

Membership of the electoral colleges is restricted to Syrians who held citizenship before 1 May 2011 (including those naturalised under Legislative Decree No. 49 of 2011), and excludes serving ministers, governors, security-force personnel, and — subject to a proof-of-defection exception — anyone who served as, or stood as a candidate for, a member of the People's Assembly after 2011, as well as anyone deemed a supporter of "the former regime" or of proscribed organisations, or an advocate of separatism. Colleges are meant to comprise 70 per cent holders of university qualifications ("competencies") and 30 per cent local notables, and the decree calls for attention to be paid, so far as possible, to communal diversity, the representation of the internally and externally displaced, and a minimum 20 per cent representation of women, along with representation for the families of "martyrs", the wounded, people with disabilities, and survivors of detention.

== Presidential elections ==
For most of Syria's history the presidency was not filled by a separate popular election. Under the First and Second Syrian Republics, the president was elected by the sitting Chamber of Deputies or Constituent Assembly rather than directly by voters. Under Ba'athist rule from 1971, the president was nominated by the ruling party and then confirmed by a single-candidate national referendum, a pattern that continued until 2014.

Law No. 5 of 2014 introduced direct election of the president by universal suffrage for the first time. To stand, a candidate must be at least 40 years old, born to two parents who were themselves Syrian citizens by birth, be in possession of full civil and political rights, not be married to a non-Syrian, have been continuously resident in Syria for at least ten years, hold no other citizenship, and be otherwise eligible to vote. A candidacy also requires the written support of at least 35 members of the People's Assembly, no member being permitted to endorse more than one candidate; candidacies are vetted by the Supreme Constitutional Court, which also adjudicates disputes over the results. A candidate who wins an absolute majority of votes cast is declared elected; if no candidate does so, a run-off is held within two weeks between the top two candidates, decided by a simple majority.

== Local elections ==
Elections to governorate, city and other local administrative councils are governed by the same general elections laws as the People's Assembly (the 2011 and 2014 laws), using local electoral districts and the same workers'-and-farmers' quota principle; the number of seats allocated to each council and constituency is set by the Ministry of Local Administration rather than fixed in the law itself.

Before those two laws were issued, local council elections were governed by Legislative Decree No. 91 of 3 October 1971, which regulated the election of governorate, city, town, village and rural-unit councils by direct secret ballot. The right to vote was granted to every Syrian citizen who had turned eighteen, with the exception of persons under legal guardianship, persons with mental illness, those convicted of certain offences, fugitives from justice, and members of the army and security forces; voters were registered on rolls reviewed annually, with objections to entries heard before a magistrate's court.

Candidacy required Syrian Arab citizenship held for at least five years, registration on the electoral roll of the constituency contested, an age of at least twenty-three, and literacy; applications for governorate council seats were referred to a committee chaired by the governor and including representatives of popular organisations and professional syndicates, which ruled within five days, with appeals against its decisions heard by a court of appeal within three days. Each city, town or village constituted a single constituency for its own council, while a governorate council's seats were distributed among its districts and provincial centre in proportion to population.

The vote was administered by a central committee in each governorate or district, which designated polling stations, appointed polling committees, ruled on objections, and tallied results; no polling station served more than 1,000 voters. Polling ran from 7:00 a.m. to 10:00 p.m., and a constituency's vote was valid only if turnout reached 51% of registered voters, failing which polling resumed the following day.

Ballots were counted publicly, with envelopes lacking the committee's seal or bearing a voter's signature or identifying mark declared invalid; candidates were ranked by valid votes received, with ties for the final seat broken by lot. Winners were appointed by presidential decree for governorate and provincial-capital city councils, and by ministerial or gubernatorial decision for other councils, with appointments open to challenge before the administrative judiciary or a judicial committee depending on the council concerned.

== See also ==
- People's Assembly of Syria
- Elections in Syria
- List of Syrian by-elections
- List of terms of the Parliament of Syria
