= Khalid al-Ansari =

Minister of Justice (Syria)
- In office c. 1990 – c. 1993
- President: Hafez al-Assad
- Prime Minister: Mahmoud Zuabi
- Preceded by: Khalid Malki (or a subsequent officeholder)
- Succeeded by: Abdulla Tulba

Khalid al-Ansari was a cabinet minister and judge in Syria. He served as justice minister in Hafez al-Assad's cabinet in the early 1990s.

== Public career ==
Khalid al-Ansari served on Syria's court of economic security prior to his appointment to cabinet.

In 1990, while serving as justice minister, he received a request from the government of East Germany for the extradition of Nazi war criminal Alois Brunner, who was widely believed to be living in Syria under an assumed name.

== Criticism ==
Syrian Human Rights Association president Muhanad Alhansi issued a paper in 2011 entitled, "A Study on the independence of the legal profession in Syria," in which he described al-Ansari as having set draconian legal precedents as a judge and as having interfered with the court of economic security's independence while in cabinet. Alhansi's article also describes al-Ansari as deceased.
