= Syrian Provisional Constitution of 1964 =

Provisional Constitution of the Syrian Arab Republic

Overview
- Original title: الدستور المؤقت للجمهورية العربية السورية
- Jurisdiction: Ba'athist Syria
- Date effective: 25 April 1964
- System: Transitional one-party state

Government structure
- Branches: Three (executive, legislative and judiciary)
- Head of state: Presidential Council
- Chambers: Unicameral (National Revolutionary Council)
- Executive: Council of Ministers; Prime Minister as head of government
- Federalism: Unitary
- Repealed: 23 February 1966
- Supersedes: Constitution of 1962
- Superseded by: Provisional Constitution of 1969

The Provisional Constitution of 1964 was enacted by the National Revolutionary Council (NRC) of Ba'athist Syria following internal power struggles within the Ba’ath Party and the consolidation of authority after the 1963 coup d'état. Adopted under the leadership of Amin al-Hafiz and the dominant military wing of the Ba’ath movement, the constitution sought to formalize revolutionary rule while providing a transitional legal framework. It established the NCRC as the supreme governing body, endowed with extensive executive and legislative powers, and affirmed the ideological principles of Arab socialism, economic state intervention, and the pursuit of Arab unity. Although intended as a step toward institutional stabilization, the constitution remained provisional and short-lived, eventually being superseded by the 1969 Provisional Constitution and later the 1973 Constitution of Ba'athist Syria under Hafez al-Assad.
