= Syrian Provisional Constitution of 1969 =

Provisional Constitution of the Syrian Arab Republic

Overview
- Original title: الدستور المؤقت للجمهورية العربية السورية
- Jurisdiction: Ba'athist Syria
- Date effective: 1 May 1969
- System: Unitary transitional one-party state

Government structure
- Branches: Three (executive, legislative and judiciary)
- Head of state: President
- Chambers: Unicameral (People's Assembly)
- Executive: President-led Council of Ministers; Prime Minister as head of government
- Judiciary: Judiciary of Syria
- Federalism: Unitary
- First legislature: 22 February 1971
- Repealed: 13 March 1973
- Supersedes: Provisional Constitution of 1964
- Superseded by: Constitution of 1973

Full text
- Provisional Constitution of Syria (1969) at Wikisource
- الدستور المؤقت للجمهورية العربية السورية at Arabic Wikisource

The Provisional Constitution of 1969 was issued by the Regional Command of the Ba’ath Party. The document concentrated political power in the hands of the President and the Ba’ath Party, formalizing a highly centralized system dominated by the executive and military leadership. The constitution emphasised Arab socialist principles, state-led economic development, and the ideological mission of Arab unity. It served as the governing framework of Syria until the adoption of the 1973 Constitution, which further entrenched Ba’athist rule under President Hafez al-Assad.
