= Muhammad Ali al-Halabi =

Prime minister of Syria (1978–1980)

- محمد علي الحلبي
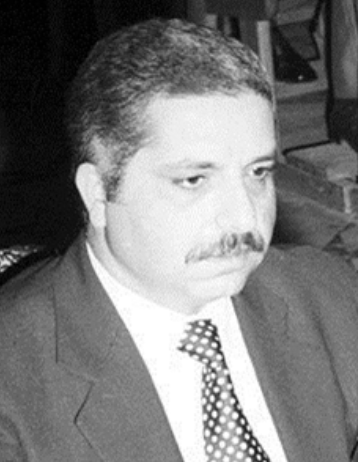

Prime Minister of Syria
- In office 27 March 1978 – 9 January 1980
- President: Hafez al-Assad
- Preceded by: Abdul Rahman Khleifawi
- Succeeded by: Abdul Rauf al-Kasm

Speaker of the People's Assembly of Syria
- In office 27 June 1973 – 9 March 1978
- Preceded by: Fahmi al-Yusufi
- Succeeded by: Mahmoud Hadid

Damascus Governor
- In office 1969–1971
- Preceded by: Mohamed Sioufi
- Succeeded by: Muhammad Yassin al-Osta

Member of the Regional Command of the Syrian Regional Branch
- In office 13 November 1970 – 7 January 1980

Personal details
- Born: 1937 Damascus, First Syrian Republic
- Died: 19 September 2016 (aged 78–79) Damascus, Syrian Arab Republic
- Party: Syrian Regional Branch of the Arab Socialist Ba'ath Party
- Other political affiliations: National Progressive Front
- Spouse: Lamis Mourad

Muhammad Ali al-Halabi (Arabic: محمد علي الحلبي, romanized: Muḥammad ʿAlī al-Ḥalabī; 1937 – 19 September 2016) was a Syrian politician.

== Biography ==
After finishing his training at the National Teacher Training Institute, Muhammed studied Philosophy at the University of Damascus. In 1955 he became a teacher on the Golan and from 1959 to 1964 he was employed as a teacher in Kuwait. From 9 June 1973 to 27 March 1978 he was chairman and spokesman for the National Council. He served as Prime Minister of Syria from March 27, 1978 to January 9, 1980 under the presidency of Hafez al-Assad. al-Halabi was an ambassador in Moscow from 1982 to 1990, during which Hafez al-Assad and Leonid Brezhnev made an agreement, to install the Soviet S-75 in al-Dumayr and Shinshar.

== Political career ==
Political offices
Preceded by Mohamed Sioufi	Damascus Governor 1969–1971	Succeeded by Muhammad Yassin al-Osta
Preceded by Fahmi al-Yusufi	Speaker of Parliament of Syria 1973–1978	Succeeded by Mahmoud Hadid
Preceded by Abdul Rahman Khleifawi	Prime Minister of Syria 1978–1980	Succeeded by Abdul Rauf al-Kasm
Preceded by Jabr al-Kafri	Ambassador of Syria to the Soviet Union 1982–1990	Succeeded by Issam al-Naeb
