= Salim Yasin =

Syrian politician (1937–2016)

Deputy Prime Minister for Economic Affairs
- In office 1985 – 14 March 2000
- President: Hafez al-Assad
- Prime Minister: Abdul Rauf al-Kasm; Mahmoud Zuabi
- Succeeded by: Khalid Raad

Member of the Regional Command of the Syrian Regional Branch
- In office 21 June 2000 – 8 December 2001

Personal details
- Born: Salim Said Yasin; 10 October 1937 Latakia, French Mandate of Syria
- Died: 6 March 2016 (aged 78) Latakia, Syria
- Party: Syrian Regional Branch of the Arab Socialist Ba'ath Party
- Education: Damascus University; University of Colorado

Salim Yasin (Arabic: سليم سعيد ياسين; 10 October 1937 – 6 March 2016) was a Syrian economist, academic and former deputy prime minister for economic affairs.

== Early life and education ==
Yasin was born in Latakia on 10 October 1937. He received a bachelor's degree from Damascus University in 1960. He obtained a master's degree in economics from the University of Colorado in 1963, and a PhD in 1965.

== Career ==
After his graduation, Yasin began to work as director of the Latakia petroleum installation in 1960 and served there for one year. From 1961 to 1965 he worked as a civil servant. Then he served as assistant professor of economics at the University of Aleppo from 1966 to 1970. He was appointed vice dean of the faculty of commerce of the same university and his tenure lasted from 1967 to 1969. He served as acting president of the University of Aleppo from 1969 to 1970. Then he became associate professor of economics and president of Tishreen University which he held from 1971 to 1978. He was the transport minister in the period 1978–1980 and then minister of planning between 1980 and 1981. Next he was named as the minister of economy and foreign trade in 1981 and was in office until 1985.

Yasin was appointed deputy prime minister in 1985. Since Prime Minister Abdel Rauf Al Kassem resigned, a new government was formed led by Mahmoud Zuabi on 2 November 1987. Yasin retained his post together with other two deputy prime ministers, namely Mustafa Tlass and Mahmoud Qaddour. Yasin was in office until March 2000 and replaced by Khalid Raad in the post. Then Yasin returned to teaching post at Damascus University. Following the death of Hafez al-Assad he was made a member of the Baath Party's regional command in June 2000.

=== Controversy ===
In June 2000, Yasin was arrested and imprisoned on charges of embezzlement for which former Prime Minister Mahmoud Zuabi was also accused. His family assets were also frozen by the government. Then he was freed in November 2000. However, on 8 December 2001, he and former transport minister Mufid Abdul Karim were sentenced to ten years in prison and fined for $240 million.

== Death ==
On 6 March 2016, Yasin died in his hometown, Latakia.
