= Shakir Al Faham =

Syrian researcher and writer

Shakir Muhammad Kamel Al-Faham (1921 – 28 June 2008) was a Syrian researcher and writer who served as a government minister in the 1960s and 1970s. He alternated between Minister of Higher Education and Minister of Education from 1970 to 1980.
