= Abdul Qadir Qaddura =

Syrian politician (1935–2013)

- عبد القادر قدورة

Speaker of the People's Assembly of Syria
- In office 19 February 1988 – 5 March 2003
- Preceded by: Mahmoud Zuabi
- Succeeded by: Muhammad Naji al-Otari

Member of the Regional Command of the Syrian Regional Branch
- In office 7 January 1980 – 9 June 2005

Personal details
- Born: 1935 Bariqa, French Syria
- Died: July 30, 2013 (aged 77–78) Damascus, Syria
- Party: Ba'ath Party

Abdul Qadir Qaddura (Arabic: عبد القادر قدورة) was a Syrian politician who was a leading member of the Syria-based wing of the Ba'ath Party, in the era of President Hafez al-Assad (in power 1970–2000). Qaddura served as speaker of the People's Council—the Syrian parliament—for much of the 1990s. He lost his post on the Ba'ath Party's leading board, the Regional Command, in 2005, as President Bashar al-Assad retired several main names from the Hafez era.

== Early life and education ==
Born in 1935 in the Circassian village of Bariqa, Qaddura was the son of Ibrahim al-Mughribi, chief of the Damascus Police during the era of President Mohammad Ali al-Abid (1932–1936). Mughrabi, of Libyan origin, often advised his son not to work in politics, saying, "A stranger should behave...what do you think you are going to become, another Shukri al-Quwatli?"

Qaddura studied briefly at the American University of Beirut, then went into the Chemistry Department at Damascus University. During the 1950s, Qaddura rose to fame as a student activist in the Ba'ath Party, long before it came to power, and co-staged demonstrations to bring down the regime of President Adib al-Shishakli in 1954. During the early years of Ba'ath Party rule, he was arrested twice, spending a total of two years in jail, and was expelled from the party by its strongman, Salah Jadid, only to be released after the Arab-Israeli War of 1967. During his prison term, he spent time at the infamous Tadmor prison with ranking pre-Ba'ath politicians like Rushdi al-Kikhya, of the Aleppo-based, People's Party.

== Career ==
Qadddura become a ranking member of the Syrian government after Hafez al-Assad came to power in 1970. He served in the state-run public sector, as CEO of Tameco, manufacturing medicine, and became Deputy Prime Minister for Economic Affairs in 1980–1985. Twice he served as Acting Prime Minister but left his job to become Head of the Economic Bureau at the Regional Command of the Ba'ath Party in the 1980s. Qaddura became Speaker of the Syrian Parliament in 1987, and held this job non-stop, until he was replaced in 2003. Qaddura is the longest serving speaker in Syrian history, followed immediately by Faris al-Khoury, who stayed at the job for 9-years.

== Personal life ==
He was married to a Damascene lady from the Jouakhi family and had four children, Nourallah, Louai, Azzah, and Layla. His eldest son Nourallah, an ophthalmologist, poet, and musician, who married the niece of Syrian Ambassador to the UK, Sami Khiyami. His son Qays died in a car accident in 1992, while studying medicine at Damascus University.

Qaddura died in Damascus on 30 July 2013.
