= Mahmoud Al-Zoubi =

Prime minister of Syria (1987–2000)

- محمود الزعبي
- Mahmoud Al-Zoubi in 1989.

Prime Minister of Syria
- In office 1 November 1987 – 7 March 2000
- President: Hafez al-Assad
- Preceded by: Abdul Rauf al-Kasm
- Succeeded by: Muhammad Mustafa Mero

Member of the Regional Command of the Syrian Regional Branch
- In office 7 January 1980 – 21 May 2000

Personal details
- Born: 1935 Khirbet Ghazaleh, Syrian Republic
- Died: 21 May 2000 (aged 64–65) Damascus, Syrian Arab Republic
- Resting place: Khirbat Ghazalah
- Party: Ba'ath Party
- Other political affiliations: National Progressive Front

Mahmoud Al-Zoubi (Arabic: محمود الزعبي, romanized: Maḥmūd az-Zuʿbī; 1935 – 21 May 2000) was Prime Minister of Syria from 1 November 1987 to 7 March 2000. He was the longest-serving prime minister of Syria.

== Early life ==
Al-Zoubi was born into the Al-Zoubi clan which is a Sunni family in 1935 in Khirbet Ghazaleh, a village 75 miles south of Damascus in the Hauran region.

== Prime Minister of Syria ==
Al-Zoubi was a member of the Ba'ath Party. Under the rule of then President Hafez Assad, Al-Zoubi was appointed prime minister in 1987.

On 7 March 2000, Al-Zoubi was replaced as prime minister by Mohammed Mustafa Mero.

=== Currency crisis ===
Between 1985 and 2000, Prime Minister Mahmoud al-Zoubi's administration failed to prevent the Syrian Pound from losing more than 90% of its value against the US Dollar. Over this period, the exchange rate plummeted from 3 to 47 pounds per US Dollar.

== Downfall and the Airbus deal controversy ==
On 10 May 2000, Hafez Assad expelled Al-Zoubi from the Ba'ath Party and decided that Al-Zoubi should be prosecuted over a scandal involving the French aircraft manufacturer Airbus. Al-Zoubi's assets were frozen by the Syrian government. Al-Zoubi and several senior ministers were officially accused of receiving illegal commissions of the order of US$124 million in relation to the purchase of six Airbus 320-200 passenger jets for Syrian Arab Airlines in 1996. The indictment alleged that the normal cost of the planes was US$250 million, but the Government paid $374 million and Airbus sent on US$124 million to the senior ministers. Three others involved in the transaction, including the former minister for economic affairs and the former minister for transport were sentenced to prison for ten years.

The French company Airbus denied paying off the Syrian officials. The Syrian government in September 2003 announced its intention of purchasing six more Airbus planes for the government airline. The official finding within Syrian courts that Airbus paid over a hundred million dollars in bribes to their officials is apparently not a factor in deciding whether to continue to do business with them, especially with Boeing aircraft and spare parts being difficult to attain due to unilateral US sanctions.

== Personal life ==
Al-Zoubi was married and had three sons and a daughter. His sons were Miflih, Hammam and Karim.

== Death and burial ==
Al-Zoubi died on 21 May 2000. Conflicting reports say he died at age 62 or 65. According to a statement from the Interior Ministry, carried by the official Syrian Arab News Agency, Al-Zoubi shot himself in the head at his home in al-Dumayr outside Damascus. The statement said Al-Zoubi died by suicide after learning that the Damascus police chief had come to his house to serve a judicial notice to appear before an investigating judge to answer allegations of corruption and other violations "that caused great harm to the national economy." An Interior Ministry spokesman said "a shot was heard upstairs and that was a shot fired by Zohbi [sic] at himself by his own pistol on the second floor of his house where his wife and children were present." The spokesman said Al-Zoubi was rushed to the Mowasat hospital in Damascus, where he later died. Hospital officials said none of his family accompanied him to the hospital. In June 2000, according to Lara Marlowe, there were persistent rumours that Al-Zoubi was actually murdered.

Al-Zoubi was buried at his birthplace in southern Syria. His funeral service took place in Deraa province on 22 May 2000. There were no officials at the ceremony. Sources said the funeral at Kirbit Ghazali, about 100 km south of Damascus, was a simple ceremony limited to his close family members and some of his hometown people.
