= People's Assembly Building (Syria) =

Meeting place of the Syrian Parliament

Coordinates: 33.518110°N 36.293094°E

- مبنى مجلس الشعب
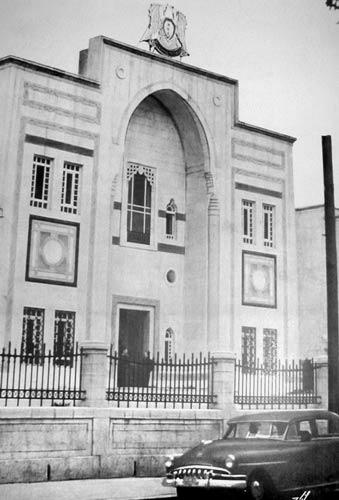
- The People's Assembly Building, sometime during the mid-20th century
- Interactive map of the People's Assembly Building area

General information
- Status: Completed
- Type: Legislative building
- Architectural style: Arab, with French influences
- Location: Damascus, Syria, Al-Salihiyah district
- Current tenants: People's Assembly
- Construction started: 1928
- Completed: 1932 (initial phase)
- Renovated: 1954, 1999, 2026

Technical details
- Floor count: Multiple

Design and construction
- Main contractor: Syrian craftsmen

The People's Assembly Building (Arabic: مبنى مجلس الشعب, romanized: Mabná Majlis al-Shaʻb), also known as the Syrian Parliament building, is the seat of the People's Assembly, located in the al-Salihiyah district of Damascus. It is regarded as one of the city's notable historic and architectural landmarks and is associated with the heritage of the Old city of Damascus.

== History ==
Construction of the building began in 1928 during the period of the French Mandate under the name Dār al-Barlamān al-Sūrī (House of the Syrian Parliament). The first phase was completed in 1932 and included the original assembly hall, which hosted parliamentary sessions until 1954. The structure was built on the site of the former Ottoman-era “Çanakkale” cinema, which had opened in 1916 but was destroyed by fire shortly thereafter, leaving the site vacant until construction began in 1928.

The building formed part of a broader urban development plan for Damascus during the early 20th century, particularly under the French Mandate, when new administrative and public buildings were constructed along what became known as Parliament Street in the al-Salihiyah district. The original complex covered approximately 6,500 square metres and was surrounded by landscaped gardens in accordance with contemporary urban planning concepts in Damascus.

On 29 May 1945, during the French bombardment of Damascus, the building sustained significant damage, and members of its guard were killed while defending it. A memorial plaque commemorating those killed during the bombardment was later installed inside the building.

In 1947, reconstruction and expansion works were initiated under parliamentary speaker Saadallah al-Jabiri. A new, larger assembly chamber was constructed over a period of seven years and inaugurated on 14 October 1954. The current dome chamber was constructed between 1947 and 1954 under the supervision of engineers Sami al-Nu'mani and Baha al-Din Zambaraki, with decorative work carried out over several years by Syrian artisans.

Further expansions were carried out during the tenure of Fares al-Khoury, including the addition of offices and committee rooms. In 1999, the building underwent additional renovation and the construction of a three-storey annex.

In 1985, the building was officially registered as a historic monument by the Directorate-General of Antiquities and Museums, and included within the protected heritage of Damascus.

In 2025 and 2026, the building underwent a major renovation ahead of the first sitting of the Transitional People's Assembly.

== Architecture ==
The building between 1950 and 1955.

The building is notable for its combination of architectural influences, reflecting both French Mandate-era planning and traditional Arab design. Decorative elements incorporate Abbasid, Fatimid, and Andalusian artistic styles.

The construction relied heavily on Syrian architects, craftsmen, and artisans, reflecting a deliberate effort to preserve local architectural traditions despite the influence of French Mandate-era planning. The initial design involved Syrian engineers and craftsmen, including Munib al-Dardari and Suhail Shabat, alongside the Spanish-born architect Fernando de Aranda, while interior decoration was carried out by local workshops such as that of Abu Amin al-Dahan.

It consists of two interconnected structures. The main building contains the principal entrance, reception halls, and the primary assembly chamber, while the secondary structure historically housed administrative and security functions.

The façades are constructed from locally sourced materials, including white limestone from Talfita, black basalt from Deir Ali, and yellow marble from Ain al-Tinah. The building is distinguished by the extensive use of Syrian materials and craftsmanship.

=== Chamber of the People's Assembly ===
Chamber of the People's Assembly.

The main assembly chamber, known as the Dome Hall (قاعة القبة, Qāʻat al-Qubbah), was completed in 1954 and remains the principal venue for parliamentary sessions. Originally designed to seat 140 members, it now accommodates approximately 210, along with designated seating for government officials.

The chamber includes galleries with a capacity of around 300 visitors, with designated sections for the president, official guests, state officials, and media representatives.

Access to the chamber is restricted to members of the People's Assembly, senior government officials, and authorised administrative staff.

== Cultural significance ==
The building is widely regarded as a symbol of Syrian statehood and parliamentary life. Its architectural design, carried out by Syrian craftsmen under the supervision of the Damascene artist Muhammad Ali al-Khayyat, reflects a synthesis of historical artistic traditions in Syria.

Due to its historical and architectural importance, it has been included among heritage-listed structures associated with Damascus. The building is also considered an architectural and cultural landmark reflecting the development of modern Syrian political institutions and urban identity.
