= Arab Socialist Movement (Damascus branch) =

Syrian political party

Arab Socialist Movement حركة الاشتراكيين العرب
- Leader: Omar Adnan al-Alawi
- Founder: Akram al-Hawrani
- Banned: 29 January 2025; 12 months ago
- Split from: Arab Socialist Movement
- Headquarters: Damascus, Syria
- Ideology: Arab socialism Arab nationalism Pan-Arabism; Neo-Ba'athism; Anti-Islamism
- Political position: Left-wing
- National affiliation: National Progressive Front (until 2025)

Website
- Facebook page

The Arab Socialist Movement's Damascus branch was a Syrian political party that operated from Damascus.

== History ==
The party originated as faction of the Arab Socialist Movement, a party which broke apart in the 1960s, and continues to claim the original party's name and legacy. The Damascus branch is headed by Abdul-Ghani Qannout, and joined the Ba'ath Party-led National Progressive Front (NPF) government in 1972 and continued to support the al-Assad family's rule in Syria until the fall of the Assad regime.

After Abdul-Ghani Qannout died in 2001, Ahmad al-Ahmad became the new secretary general; under him, the party continued its pro-government course, even during the Syrian Civil War. Amid the conflict's civil uprising phase, the Arab Socialist Movement's Damascus branch organised pro-government rallies. When the uprising escalated into a full insurgency, members of the party organised pro-government militias. Assistant secretary general Omar Adnan al-Alawi headed the National Defence Forces' Deir ez-Zor branch during part of the siege of Deir ez-Zor (2014–2017), and was wounded in combat. A member of the party's political office, Turki Albu Hamad, played a leading role in founding the "Forces of the Fighters of the Tribes" militia.

Following the fall of the Assad regime the party, along with all other NPF members, was dissolved by the Syrian transitional government on 29 January 2025.
