= List of members of the People's Assembly (Syria), 2026–present =

This is a list of members elected to the Transitional People's Assembly, following the 2025–26 parliamentary election.

== Composition ==
Several members of the People's Assembly (MPs) are affiliated with political parties. As of August 2026, none of these parties are officially licensed or registered in Syria; consequently, the following table reflects de facto party affiliations. De jure, all MPs are independents.

Party		Members		
Party		At commencement	Current	Difference
Independent		172 / 210 (82%)	171 / 210 (81%)	▼1
Muslim Brotherhood (Note: Affiliated members)		25 / 210 (12%)	25 / 210 (12%)	Steady
Kurdish National Council	Kurdistan Democratic Party of Syria	4 / 210 (2%)	4 / 210 (2%)	Steady
Kurdish National Council	Kurdistan Democratic Unity Party	1 / 210 (0.5%)	1 / 210 (0.5%)	Steady
Kurdish National Council	Kurdish Democratic Equality Party in Syria	1 / 210 (0.5%)	1 / 210 (0.5%)	Steady
Syrian Turkmen Assembly		1 / 210 (0.5%)	1 / 210 (0.5%)	Steady
Assyrian Democratic Organization		1 / 210 (0.5%)	1 / 210 (0.5%)	Steady
Movement for Justice and Development		1 / 210 (0.5%)	1 / 210 (0.5%)	Steady
Vacant		4 / 210 (2%)	5 / 210 (2%)	▲1

== Elected members ==
No.	Governorate	Electoral district	Name	Party
1	Aleppo	Mount Simeon	Ahmad Muhammad al-Hariri	Independent
2	Aleppo	Mount Simeon	Bashar Najm ad-Din al-Hawi	Independent
3	Aleppo	Mount Simeon	Tammam al-Luda'mi	Independent
4	Aleppo	Mount Simeon	Arif Razzuq	Independent
5	Aleppo	Mount Simeon	Abdul-Aziz Maghribi	Independent
6	Aleppo	Mount Simeon	Abdul-Qadir Khoja	Independent
7	Aleppo	Mount Simeon	Abdul-Karim Akidi	Independent
8	Aleppo	Mount Simeon	Azzam Khanji	Independent
9	Aleppo	Mount Simeon	Aqeel Hussein	Independent
10	Aleppo	Mount Simeon	Ali al-Jassim	Independent
11	Aleppo	Mount Simeon	Ammar Tawouz	Independent
12	Aleppo	Mount Simeon	Muhammad Ramez Korej	Independent
13	Aleppo	Mount Simeon	Mahmoud Mustafa	Independent
14	Aleppo	Mount Simeon	Muhedi Issa	Independent
15	Aleppo	Azaz	Bashir Alito	Independent
16	Aleppo	Azaz	Jaafar as-Sadiq Tahan	Independent
17	Aleppo	Azaz	Mu'ayyad Qabtour	Independent
18	Aleppo	Al-Bab	Muhammad al-Mahali	Independent
19	Aleppo	Al-Bab	Osama an-Na'ous	Independent
20	Aleppo	Al-Bab	Tariq Salou	Independent
21	Aleppo	As-Safira and Dayr Hafir	Omar Gharibo	Independent
22	Aleppo	As-Safira and Dayr Hafir	Ghassan al-Abdullah	Independent
23	Aleppo	Atarib	Ahmad Saleh	Independent
24	Aleppo	Jarabulus	Tariq Hamad	Independent
25	Aleppo	Afrin	Rankin Abdo	Independent
26	Aleppo	Afrin	Sheikh Saeed Sheikh Ismail Zadeh	KDPS (Note: Not officially recognized as a represented political party in the People's Assembly.)
27	Aleppo	Afrin	Muhammad Sido	KDPS
28	Aleppo	Ayn al-Arab	Farhad Shahin	KDPS
29	Aleppo	Ayn al-Arab	Shawakh al-Assaf	Independent
30	Aleppo	Manbij	Ahmad al-Ta'aan	Independent
31	Aleppo	Manbij	Ibrahim at-Talib	Independent
32	Aleppo	Manbij	Mustafa Haj Abdullah	Independent
33	Damascus	Damascus	Hassan ash-Sheikha	Independent
34	Damascus	Damascus	Radwan as-Sabinaty	Independent
35	Damascus	Damascus	Adnan al-Khatib	Independent
36	Damascus	Damascus	Ammar Sharqatli	Independent
37	Damascus	Damascus	Muhammad Basil Helm	Independent
38	Damascus	Damascus	Muhammad Saadi Sukriya	Independent
39	Damascus	Damascus	Muhammad Fadi al-Halabi	Independent
40	Damascus	Damascus	Muhammad Wissam Zaghloul	Independent
41	Damascus	Damascus	Nizar al-Madani	Independent
42	Damascus	Damascus	Hisham al-Afyouni	Independent
43	Rif Dimashq	Rif Dimashq and Yabroud	Hassan Ataya	Independent
44	Rif Dimashq	Rif Dimashq and Yabroud	Muhammad Suleiman Dahla	Independent
45	Rif Dimashq	Rif Dimashq and Yabroud	Muhammad Azzam Haidar	Independent
46	Rif Dimashq	Az-Zabadani	Imad al-Ashrafani	Independent
47	Rif Dimashq	At-Tall	Ayman Shamo	Independent
48	Rif Dimashq	Al-Qutayfah	Khaled Urabi	Independent
49	Rif Dimashq	Al-Nabek	Muhammad Sharif Talib	Independent
50	Rif Dimashq	Darayya	Mu'ayyad Habib	Independent
51	Rif Dimashq	Douma	Hussam Hamdan	Independent
52	Rif Dimashq	Douma	Mustafa Saqr	Independent
53	Rif Dimashq	Douma	Nizar ash-Shayeb	Independent
54	Rif Dimashq	Qatana	Ali Masoud	Independent
55	Homs	Homs	Abdullah Ghannoum	Independent
56	Homs	Homs	Qutaiba al-Issa	Independent
57	Homs	Homs	Kinan al-Nahhas	Independent
58	Homs	Homs	Muhammad al-Bakir	Independent
59	Homs	Homs	Nader Sanoufi	Independent
60	Homs	Homs	Nasser al-Muhaimid	Independent
61	Homs	Homs	Nour al-Jandali	Independent
62	Homs	Homs	Waddah Rajab	Independent
63	Homs	Al-Rastan	Muhammad Ayoub	Independent
64	Homs	Al-Qusayr and al-Mukharram	Ahmed al-Smail	Independent
65	Homs	Tadmur	Mahmoud Asaad	Independent
66	Homs	Talkalakh	Salem al-Ahmad	Independent
67	Hama	Hama	Bassam al-Hussein	Independent
68	Hama	Hama	Tariq al-Madani	Independent
69	Hama	Hama	Abdullah al-Haj Abdullah	Independent
70	Hama	Hama	Uthman an-Naqqar	Independent
71	Hama	Hama	Mu'mina Arbo	Independent
72	Hama	Al-Suqaylabiyah	Abdul-Razzaq al-Aliwi	Independent
73	Hama	Al-Suqaylabiyah	Abdul-Fattah Obaid	Independent
74	Hama	Salamiyah	Abdullah ash-Sha'ar	Independent
75	Hama	Salamiyah	Yasser ash-Shahada	Independent
76	Hama	Mharda	Abdul-Nasser al-Hawshan	Independent
77	Hama	Masyaf	Ibrahim al-Abdullah	Independent
78	Hama	Masyaf	Samer Muhammad	Independent
79	Al-Hasakah	Al-Hasakah	Ibrahim al-Ali	Independent
80	Al-Hasakah	Al-Hasakah	Omar Hayes	Independent
81	Al-Hasakah	Al-Hasakah	Fasla Youssef	KDUP
82	Al-Hasakah	Qamishli	Kim Ibrahim	Independent
83	Al-Hasakah	Qamishli	Radwan Sido	KDEP
84	Al-Hasakah	Qamishli	Abdul-Halim al-Ali	Independent
85	Al-Hasakah	Qamishli	Mahmoud al-Ali	Independent
86	Al-Hasakah	Al-Malikiyah	Ahmad Murad	Independent
87	Al-Hasakah	Al-Malikiyah	Alwan al-Ali	Independent
88	Al-Hasakah	Ras al-Ayn	Abdullah al-Abdullah	Independent
89	Latakia	Latakia	Jamal Makis	Independent
90	Latakia	Latakia	Rula Dayeh	Independent
91	Latakia	Latakia	Samer Qara Ali	Independent
92	Latakia	Al-Haffah	Refa'a Akrameh	Independent
93	Latakia	Qardaha	Aws Othman	Independent
94	Latakia	Jableh	Ali Yaqoub Agha	Independent
95	Latakia	Jableh	Rami Mahfoudh	Independent
96	Tartus	Tartus	Abdul-Razzaq Rayes	Independent
97	Tartus	Tartus	Azzam Jahjah	Independent
98	Tartus	Duraykish and al-Shaykh Badr	Lina Aizouqi	Independent
99	Tartus	Safita	Mai Khalouf	Independent
100	Tartus	Baniyas	Amjad Ali	Independent
101	Deir ez-Zor	Deir ez-Zor	Ahmed al-Shalash	Independent
102	Deir ez-Zor	Deir ez-Zor	Akram al-Assaf	Independent
103	Deir ez-Zor	Deir ez-Zor	Khaled al-Khalaf	Independent
104	Deir ez-Zor	Deir ez-Zor	Aamir al-Bashir	Independent
105	Deir ez-Zor	Deir ez-Zor	Fajr al-Ahmad	Independent
106	Deir ez-Zor	Abu Kamal	Amir ad-Dandal	Independent
107	Deir ez-Zor	Abu Kamal	Osama al-Assaf	Independent
108	Deir ez-Zor	Abu Kamal	Mahmoud al-Uweis	Independent
109	Deir ez-Zor	Mayadin	Ayesh az-Zarqa	Independent
110	Deir ez-Zor	Mayadin	Marwan an-Nazhan	Independent
111	Raqqa	Raqqa	Ahmad al-Khalaf al-Shallash	Independent
112	Raqqa	Raqqa	Ahmad al-Omar	Independent
113	Raqqa	Raqqa	Miqdam Ali al-Jash’am	Independent
114	Raqqa	Tabqa	Abdullah al-Haj Abd	Independent
115	Raqqa	Tell Abyad	Khalil al-Kanou	Independent
116	Raqqa	Tell Abyad	Saad al-Shweish	Independent
117	Idlib	Idlib	Hussam Dbeis	Independent
118	Idlib	Idlib	Abdul-Razzaq Awad	Independent
119	Idlib	Idlib	Mazen Ghazal	Independent
120	Idlib	Maarat al-Numan	Faraj Aqdi	Independent
121	Idlib	Maarat al-Numan	Muhammad Firas al-Jundi	Independent
122	Idlib	Khan Shaykhun	Khaled al-Saloum	Independent
123	Idlib	Jisr ash-Shughur	Vacant (Note: Muhammad Kaltoum was elected to the People's Assembly for the Jisr ash-Shughur electoral district on 5 October 2025. However, Kaltoum died on 14 June 2026, before the assembly had convened. Under the provisional electoral system, the vacancy is to be filled by presidential appointment.)	
124	Idlib	Jisr ash-Shughur	Mustafa al-Mousa	Independent
125	Idlib	Harem	Iqbal Mansour	Independent
126	Idlib	Harem	Wajdi Zaido	Independent
127	Idlib	Ariha	Tahir Abdul-Baqi	Independent
128	Idlib	Ariha	Abdul-Haseeb Daghmash	Independent
129	Daraa	Daraa	Abdul-Rahman al-Hariri	Independent
130	Daraa	Daraa	Adnan al-Masalma	Independent
131	Daraa	Daraa	Nizar ar-Rashdan	Independent
132	Daraa	As-Sanamayn	Muhammad al-Asi	Independent
133	Daraa	Izraa	Abdul-Mawla al-Hariri	Independent
134	Daraa	Izraa	Muhammad Surur al-Mudhib	Independent
135	Suwayda	Suwayda	Vacant (Note: Elections in Suwayda Governorate were postponed and its three seats remain vacant. See Regional postponements.)	
136	Suwayda	Shahba	Vacant	
137	Suwayda	Salkhad	Vacant	
138	Quneitra	Quneitra	Jamal an-Numeri	Independent
139	Quneitra	Quneitra	Tariq adh-Dhiyab	Independent
140	Quneitra	Fiq	Amin al-Bashir	Independent

== Appointed members ==
The President of Syria is to appoint 70 members, one-third of the assembly. By late May 2026, Syrian officials reported that President Ahmed al-Sharaa's list of appointees had been finalized and would be announced "in the coming days", and that the assembly's inaugural session had been preliminarily scheduled for 8 June 2026, after the Eid al-Adha holiday; the three Suwayda seats were to remain vacant until security conditions allowed elections there. Hawar News Agency reported that first session of the People's Assembly would be held on 8 June 2026, but despite those reports, it did not convene.

On 30 June, it was officially confirmed that the list of al-Sharaa's appointees would be released on 1 July. Al-Sharaa's appointees were chosen by a committee that completed a series of meetings and closed interviews conducted between 15 and 21 June, interviewing 100 candidates.

The appointments were officially announced on 1 July, with 15 women among those appointed, 13 of whom had previously been imprisoned under the previous regime. The appointees included three members of Syria's Turkmen community: Abdurrahman Mustafa, president of the Syrian Turkmen Assembly, along with Imad Barq and Khalil Darda al-Abdullah. The Secretary-General of the People's Assembly, Muhammad Hamza Shamout, explained that the "supplementary third" of the Assembly's members comprises 23 notables and 47 qualified professionals, including 12 with masters degrees and 17 with PhDs.

No.	Name	Party
141	Asma al-Saba'i	Independent
142	Anas al-Abdah	MJD-S
143	Ayman al-Shuqairi	Independent
144	Ahmad Zaidan	Independent
145	Ahmad al-Afdal	Independent
146	Ahmad Nawaf al-Jarba	Independent
147	Israa al-Mashhour	Independent
148	Bader Jamous	Independent
149	Husam al-Din Tatari	Independent
150	Husam al-Din Razma	Independent
151	Hassan Daghim	Independent
152	Hassan Soufan	Independent
153	Hussein al-Ali	Independent
154	Hussein Assaf	Independent
155	Hamza Qablan	Independent
156	Hammoud al-Hassan al-Hamoud	Independent
157	Hanan al-Balkhi	Independent
158	Khaldoun al-Ahmad	Independent
159	Khalil al-Abdullah	Independent
160	Da'wa al-Ahdab	Independent
161	Rami al-Saleh	Independent
162	Rouzaina Lazkani	Independent
163	Saud al-Najras	Independent
164	Sumaya Murad	Independent
165	Samira al-Watar	Independent
166	Suhail al-Fadel	Independent
167	Subh al-Badah	Independent
168	Aisha al-Dibs	Independent
169	Abdul Hamid al-Awak	Independent
170	Abdurrahman Mustafa	STM
171	Abdul-Karim Barakat	Independent
172	Abdul-Moneim al-Nassif	Independent
173	Abdul Hakim Bashar	KDPS
174	Abdullah al-Zayed	Independent
175	Alaa al-Mousa	Independent
176	Imad Barq	Independent
177	Omar al-Muhammad	Independent
178	Issa Muhammad Ibrahim	Independent
179	Fatima al-Youssef	Independent
180	Fatima Haidar	Independent
181	Gabriel Moushe Gawrieh	ADO
182	Lara Qadid	Independent
183	Laith al-Balous	Independent
184	Mouayad al-Qablawi	Independent
185	Madonna Bishara	Independent
186	Maher Alloush	Independent
187	Muhammad Ibrahim al-Zoubi	Independent
188	Muhammad al-Rabat	Independent
189	Mohammed al-Tariha	Independent
190	Mohammed Balas	Independent
191	Muhammad Haj Othman	Independent
192	Mohammed Dalwan	Independent
193	Muhammad Saeed al-Hasou	Independent
194	Mohammed Ali Yassin	Independent
195	Mohammed Yasser al-Humaidi al-Hamad	Independent
196	Mervat Toto	Independent
197	Mustafa Abdul-Rahman Abdi	Independent
198	Mustafa Akoush	Independent
199	Musab al-Hafel	Independent
200	Mudar Hamdan	Independent
201	Munther Saras	Independent
202	Muharib al-Hamoud	Independent
203	Naser al-Hariri	Independent
204	Najwa Qassas	Independent
205	Nawar Najma	Independent
206	Huda al-Atassi	Independent
207	Haitham al-Ma'sas	Independent
208	Wadih Haj Hamoud	Independent
209	Yasser Suleiman Mansour	Independent
210	Yahya Muhammad Imad Ibrahim	Independent

== Changes ==
Electoral district	Date	Previous incumbent	Party	New incumbent	Party	Cause
Appointed	TBD	Mudar Hamdan	Independent	TBD		Resignation (Note: Following his appointment, Hamdan faced accusations of supporting the Assad regime. The Assembly subsequently suspended his attendance and activities on a temporary basis. In August 2026, Hamdan submitted his resignation, citing "systematic defamatory online campaigns" that he said had damaged his reputation. He described the allegations as "fabricated lies and false claims" and argued that remaining a member could impede the Assembly's legislative work. Hamdan characterised his resignation as "voluntary and responsible", motivated by "genuine concern for the nation" and a desire to preserve the Assembly's standing. His resignation was accepted by the Assembly at its sitting on 13 September.)
