= Transitional People's Assembly of Syria =

Legislative term of Syria's parliament from 2026

Transitional People's Assembly
←	4th	Next	→

Overview
- Legislative body: People's Assembly
- Jurisdiction: Syria
- Meeting place: People's Assembly Building, Damascus
- Term: 12 July 2026 – present
- Election: 2025
- Government: Transitional

People's Assembly
- Independent (171); Muslim Brotherhood (25); ENKS (6) (Note: KDPS (4); KDUP (1); KDEP (1)); ADO (1); MJDS (1); STA (1); Vacant (5) (Note: Three of the electoral districts that these seats represent are currently mostly under control of the Administrative Council of Jabal Bashan amidst the Druze insurgency in the region. Two seats are left vacant due to the death of Muhammad Mustafa Kaltoum and the resignation of Mudar Hamdan.)
- Members: 210 (Note: Including five vacant seats.)
- Speaker: Abdul Hamid al-Awak (I)
- First Deputy Speaker: Mustafa al-Mousa (I)
- Second Deputy Speaker: Madonna Bishara (I)
- Secretary: Mu'ayyad Habib (I)

Sessions
- 1st: 18 October 2026 – present

Special sessions
- 1st: 12 July – 20 September 2026

The People's Assembly (Arabic: مجلس الشعب, romanized: Majlis al-Shaʿb), also known as the Transitional People's Assembly (Arabic: مجلس الشعب الانتقالي, romanized: Majlis al-Shaʿb al-Intiqālī), and occasionally as the First People's Assembly (Arabic: الدور التشريعي الأول, romanized: Al-dawr al-tashrīʿī al-awwal), is Syria's first legislative term since the fall of the Assad regime, and the twenty-second since the founding of the republic in 1932.

The term of the People's Assembly is two and a half years (thirty months), subject to renewal. Therefore, if its term is not renewed, it will expire thirty months after its first sitting on 12 July 2026, on 12 January 2029.

== Background ==
Following the fall of the Assad regime on 8 December 2024, the People's Assembly issued a statement calling that day a "historic day in the lives of all Syrians", stating that it would work towards ensuring the rule of law without discrimination. On 12 December 2024, the Syrian caretaker government suspended both the Assembly and the constitution for a three-month transitional period. The Assembly was formally dissolved on 29 January 2025, when the transitional authorities announced plans to establish an interim legislative council.

The Constitutional Declaration was adopted on 13 March, and provided for the establishment of a provisional legislature, also referred to as the "People's Assembly", to serve during a five-year transitional period. Under the transitional framework, one-third of the members are appointed by the president, while the remaining two-thirds are selected through electoral bodies supervised by a committee designated by the presidency.

On 2 June 2025, a presidential decree established the Higher Committee for People's Assembly Elections, an 11-member body responsible for overseeing the formation of electoral subcommittees tasked with selecting members of the Assembly. No time limit was set for the Committee to complete its work, and Syria's legislative and oversight vacuum accordingly extended for many months before the Assembly convened.

The convening of the Assembly's first sitting was repeatedly delayed: Foreign Minister Asaad al-Shaibani announced, from the Manama Dialogue, that the sitting would be held at the end of November 2025, a date which passed without the sitting taking place and without any formal postponement being announced; President Ahmed al-Sharaa then announced, from the Antalya Diplomacy Forum in March 2026, that the sitting would be held at the end of April 2026, a date which likewise did not materialise.

On 1 November 2025, the Higher Committee for People's Assembly Elections announced what it described as the final results of member elections in the electoral districts of Syria's governorates, with the exception of Al-Hasakah, Raqqa and Suwayda governorates, for political and security reasons; the selection of Al-Hasakah's and Raqqa's members was completed by May 2026, while the Arab press reported a semi-official date of 8 June 2026 for the first sitting, following the announcement of the president's quota and final ratification of all members elected through the regional bodies, before this too was postponed again until 12 July.

== Bureau of the People's Assembly ==
Position		Name	Party	Tenure
Speaker		Abdul Hamid al-Awak	Independent	12 July 2026 – present
Deputy Speaker	1st	Mustafa al-Mousa	Independent	12 July 2026 – present
Deputy Speaker	2nd	Madonna Bishara	Independent	12 July 2026 – present
Secretary		Mu'ayyad Habib	Independent	12 July 2026 – present

=== Elections of the Bureau ===
The People's Assembly elected its bureau at the first sitting of the first special session, on 12 July 2026.

Election of the Speaker
Candidate	Party	Votes	%
Abdul Hamid al-Awak	Independent	99	48.29
Mouayad al-Qablawi	Independent	75	36.59
Muhammad Ramez Korej	Independent	31	15.12
Total		205	100.00
Valid votes		205	99.51
Invalid/blank votes		1	0.49
Total votes		206	100.00
Registered voters/turnout		206	100.00
Abdul Hamid al-Awak is elected			

Election of the Deputy Speakers
Candidate	Party	Votes	%
Mustafa al-Mousa	Independent	122	59.51
Madonna Bishara	Independent	67	32.68
Adnan al-Khatib	Independent	52	25.37
Ghassan al-Abdullah	Independent	43	20.98
Nour al-Jandali	Independent	38	18.54
Muhammad al-Bakir	Independent	34	16.59
Rankin Abdo	Independent	23	11.22
Muhammad Suleiman Dahla	Independent	15	7.32
Abdul Hakim Bashar	KDPS	10	4.88
Mai Khalouf	Independent	7	3.41
Total		411	100.00
Valid votes		205	99.51
Invalid/blank votes		1	0.49
Total votes		206	100.00
Registered voters/turnout		206	100.00
Mustafa al-Mousa is elected			
Madonna Bishara is elected			

Election of the Secretary
Candidate	Party	Votes	%
Mu'ayyad Habib	Independent	87	42.44
Abdul-Karim Barakat	Independent	47	22.93
Yasser ash-Shahada	Independent	26	12.68
Omar Gharibo	Independent	23	11.22
Jaafar as-Sadiq Tahan	Independent	11	5.37
Ayesh az-Zarqa	Independent	11	5.37
Total		205	100.00
Valid votes		205	99.51
Invalid/blank votes		1	0.49
Total votes		206	100.00
Registered voters/turnout		206	100.00
Mu'ayyad Habib is elected			

== Members ==
The Assembly's membership includes 22 women, about 10.5% of its total seats, of whom seven were elected through the electoral bodies and 15 were appointed by President al-Sharaa as part of the supplementary third. The Assembly also has 12 Kurdish members, out of 210, or 5.7% of its total seats.

In July 2026, the Assembly announced the temporary suspension of member Mudar Hamdan's attendance and activities within the Assembly, following a campaign of accusations linking him to the former regime, pending review of his file and the issuing of recommendations by a specialised committee; the Assembly stressed that the suspension did not amount to a decision to expel him or terminate his membership.

Several members of the People's Assembly (MPs) are affiliated with political parties. As of August 2026, none of these parties are officially licensed or registered in Syria; consequently, the following table reflects de facto party affiliations. De jure, all MPs are independents.

Party		Members		
Party		At commencement	Current	Difference
Independent		172 / 210 (82%)	171 / 210 (81%)	▼1
Muslim Brotherhood (Note: Affiliated members)		25 / 210 (12%)	25 / 210 (12%)	Steady
Kurdish National Council	Kurdistan Democratic Party of Syria	4 / 210 (2%)	4 / 210 (2%)	Steady
Kurdish National Council	Kurdistan Democratic Unity Party	1 / 210 (0.5%)	1 / 210 (0.5%)	Steady
Kurdish National Council	Kurdish Democratic Equality Party in Syria	1 / 210 (0.5%)	1 / 210 (0.5%)	Steady
Syrian Turkmen Assembly		1 / 210 (0.5%)	1 / 210 (0.5%)	Steady
Assyrian Democratic Organization		1 / 210 (0.5%)	1 / 210 (0.5%)	Steady
Movement for Justice and Development		1 / 210 (0.5%)	1 / 210 (0.5%)	Steady
Vacant		4 / 210 (2%)	5 / 210 (2%)	▲1

=== Remuneration ===
Abdul-Nasser al-Hawshan said in an interview with the Syrian News Channel that Assembly members receive a monthly grant of US$1,500 (US$18,000 a year), plus US$50 for each sitting attended and a housing allowance of US$300 for six months; he said the amounts were not necessarily final, as the final salary had not been settled within the draft budget. Nawar Najma told Al-Quds Al-Arabi that People's Assembly members receive a salary of US$1,500, with allowances for attending sittings or carrying out other tasks, and a housing allowance of US$500 for members living more than 150 kilometres from Damascus; he acknowledged that the sum might appear high against Syrian wages, with a public-sector minimum wage of under US$100, but argued that the problem lay in the low wage level, and that financial independence helps secure members' integrity.

The disclosure drew criticism on social media amid the country's economic crisis, and no official schedule setting the amounts definitively had been published. Deputy Speaker Mustafa al-Mousa said a housing allowance had been set for members from outside Damascus, as the Assembly's own residential buildings needed rehabilitation before they could be used.

== Election and appointment ==
On election day, 5 October 2025, 119 members were elected, after voting was postponed in 21 seats across Suwayda, Raqqa and Al-Hasakah governorates and the Ayn al-Arab district for security reasons. Additional election rounds were subsequently held on 23 October 2025, 17 March 2026 and 24 May 2026, raising the number of elected members to 137; the three seats in Suwayda Governorate remain vacant.

The President of Syria is to appoint 70 members, one-third of the assembly. By late May 2026, Syrian officials reported that President Ahmed al-Sharaa's list of appointees had been finalised and would be announced "in the coming days", and that the assembly's inaugural sitting had been preliminarily scheduled for 8 June 2026, after the Eid al-Adha holiday; the three Suwayda seats were to remain vacant until security conditions allowed elections there. Hawar News Agency reported that the first sitting of the People's Assembly would be held on 8 June 2026, but despite those reports, it did not convene.

On 30 June, it was officially confirmed that the list of al-Sharaa's appointees would be released on 1 July. Al-Sharaa's appointees were chosen by a committee that completed a series of meetings and closed interviews conducted between 15 and 21 June, interviewing 100 candidates. The appointments were officially announced on 1 July, with 15 women appointed. The Secretary-General of the People's Assembly, Muhammad Hamza Shamout, explained that the "supplementary third" of the Assembly's members comprises 23 notables and 47 qualified professionals, including 12 with master's degrees and 17 with PhDs.

Although the inaugural sitting had been scheduled for 6 July 2026, the Higher Committee for People's Assembly Elections postponed it on 5 July to an unspecified later date without publicly stating a reason. Under Article 39 of the provisional electoral system, the Higher Committee chairman must convene members for the first sitting within three to seven days of the decree naming the Assembly's members.

== Postponement of the first sitting ==
Reports on the reason for the delay diverged. Some accounts framed the postponement as more than an administrative matter, describing it as an early signal of the political balances shaping the new transitional period, with the delay tied to ongoing efforts to reach cross-bloc consensus on the Assembly's bureau — whose composition was seen as needing to reflect the political, ethnic and religious make-up of the new chamber. Other accounts linked it to security arrangements surrounding French President Emmanuel Macron's visit to Damascus on 6 July and President al-Sharaa's attendance at the NATO summit in Ankara, with the sitting then expected to be rescheduled within a day or two. However, two Assembly members told Al-Quds al-Arabi they considered it unlikely the postponement was connected to the Macron visit, since it had long been scheduled and the Higher Committee chairman, a senior foreign ministry official, would have known of it in advance; they instead attributed the delay to objections raised over the "procedural instructions for the first sitting" document.

That document, circulated to members before the sitting scheduled for 6 July, drew objections on several points where it appeared to conflict with the Constitutional Declaration and the provisional electoral system:

- Who presides: the instructions gave the Higher Committee chairman an expanded role in opening the sitting, calling the roll, administering the oath and inviting the President to speak, before handing the chair to the oldest member after a recess and the start of the bureau elections — whereas Article 39 of the electoral system and Article 28 of the Constitutional Declaration both provide that the first sitting is chaired by the oldest member.
- The oath: the Constitutional Declaration provides for members to take the oath before the President, whereas the procedural instructions had them take it during the sitting under a different procedure; a separate account reported that the instructions instead provided for the oath to be taken before the Speaker of the Assembly rather than the President, framed as enshrining the principle of separation of powers.
- Timing of the President's address: the instructions had the Higher Committee chairman invite the President to speak during the first sitting, before the bureau election, whereas Article 40 of the electoral system provides for the elected Speaker of the Assembly to invite the President to address the second sitting.
- Bureau composition: Article 28 of the Constitutional Declaration provides for a Speaker, two deputy speakers and one secretary, while Article 39 of the electoral system provides for a Speaker, one deputy speaker and two secretaries; the instructions followed the formula of one deputy speaker and two secretaries.
- Voting threshold: the Constitutional Declaration specifies election "by majority" without defining whether this means an absolute majority, a majority of those present, or a plurality; the procedural instructions declared the candidate with the largest number of valid votes the winner regardless of whether this exceeded half the votes, without providing for a run-off round or a tie-breaking mechanism.
- New candidacy restriction: the instructions barred a candidate defeated in one bureau election from later standing for another bureau post during the same sitting, a restriction found in neither the Constitutional Declaration nor the electoral system.

Objectors also questioned the Higher Committee's impartiality in managing the sitting, noting that seven of its own members had themselves become Assembly members under the president's supplementary list.

Following the postponement, the Higher Committee created a WhatsApp group of 207 of the Assembly's 210 members (excluding the three vacant Suwayda seats), together with Higher Committee members, to discuss the upcoming sitting and canvass declared candidacies for the bureau posts alike; the disputed procedures were circulated there and confirmed in their final form, despite continued objections. Members said the sitting could not be held until a consensus was reached on forming a bureau reflecting the different components of Syrian society, and that this depended in part on President al-Sharaa's return from Turkey.

== Candidates for the Bureau elections ==
By early July, seven members had declared candidacies for Speaker: Abdul Hamid al-Awak, a legal adviser and member of the committee that drafted the Constitutional Declaration, appointed for Al-Hasakah Governorate; Azzam Khanji, elected for Mount Simeon, associated with the Muslim Brotherhood, a characterisation he has denied; Mohammed Ali Yassin, a presidential adviser appointed for Aleppo Governorate; Jaafar as-Sadiq Tahan, elected for the Azaz electoral district; Mu'ayyad Qabtour, elected for Azaz; Jamal an-Numeri, elected for Quneitra; and Mahmoud Asaad, elected for Tadmur. Despite the number of declared candidates, parliamentary and political sources described the real contest as narrowed to a small number of names, with contacts under way to persuade some to withdraw in favour of a consensus candidate who could spare the Assembly a contested vote in its first sitting.

Al-Awak emerged as the frontrunner, drawing support across the Jazira bloc (Deir ez-Zor, Raqqa and Al-Hasakah, with 42 votes) as well as broad Muslim and Christian backing, owing to his role in drafting the Constitutional Declaration and in national dialogue efforts. Sources described him as gaining momentum in the days before the scheduled sitting, citing his legal background and consensus-oriented profile as qualities drawing support from blocs seeking a Speaker able to manage a politically and socially diverse chamber; some sources noted he was seen as personally professional and technical in character, without association with political disputes that might trouble particular communities. Al-Awak reportedly presented himself in meetings with Assembly members as backed by President al-Sharaa, though the presidency had not officially committed to any single candidate and had issued no public statement on the race; separately, several government officials were said to be working individually to build support for al-Awak, a stance sources characterised as reflecting personal positions rather than a formal presidential decision.

A rival bid came from Khanji of the Aleppo bloc; a competing Aleppo candidate, Yassin, claimed the backing of 20 of the province's 46 votes. To avoid splitting the province's vote, the Aleppo bloc held a binding internal ballot in which Yassin received 32 votes, formalising him as the bloc's candidate in cross-bloc negotiations; members described the vote as an effort to present a unified front rather than a sign of division within the bloc. Bloc members linked the push for the Speakership to Aleppo's position as Syria's largest province by population and economic weight, arguing this was not matched by political representation in decision-making circles, while stressing the bid was not meant as a confrontation with the presidency or other blocs; they said they were prepared to drop their candidate if consultations produced a broadly accepted consensus figure, describing a successful first sitting as a higher priority than the contest over posts.

For the deputy speakers' posts, discussion centred on selecting one woman, possibly Kurdish, and one Christian member, with Nawar Najma — the Higher Committee's spokesman and a member of the Greek Orthodox church, the largest Christian denomination in Syria — leading the list of candidates for the Christian seat. Christian churches urged the government to preserve a decades-long tradition of a Christian deputy speaker, a request given added weight after Christian representation in the Assembly fell to roughly 3% (six of 210 seats) from about 8% (20 of 250) in the previous assembly; Christian sources described preserving this representation within the bureau as carrying political and symbolic weight beyond the distribution of posts, framing it as reassurance about partnership in state institutions during the transitional period.

== Parliamentary blocs ==
Several blocs were reported to be forming among members even before the Assembly's first sitting: a pro-government bloc, described as the largest; a bloc close to the Muslim Brotherhood estimated at around 40 members; a roughly 20-member "democratic" bloc of liberals, former socialists and communists, nationalists and members linked to the National Coalition of Syrian Revolutionary and Opposition Forces, seen as a potential swing bloc; and a nascent coalition of ethnic and religious minorities encompassing Kurdish, Syriac, Christian, Ismaili, Druze and Alawite members, which had not yet fully coalesced. The Assembly's eleven Kurdish members were reported to be distributed across these blocs rather than forming a unified voting bloc. Parliamentary sources cautioned these alignments remained in formation and could shift after the bureau election, but said they marked the first appearance of genuine political balances within a Syrian legislative body, after decades in which the People's Assembly had functioned more as a body ratifying executive decisions than as a forum for political debate and competition.

The final hours before the sitting convened saw heated discussions over endorsing certain candidates for bureau posts or pressuring others to withdraw; sources said the dispute played out between Assembly members on one side and representatives of the executive authority on the other, who intervened to endorse some candidates and press for others to withdraw, succeeding in part just hours before the opening sitting began, while a majority of members, according to the same sources, held to the Assembly's independence in choosing its bureau through either election or internal consensus. The Syrian administration attached great importance to the Assembly speakership because of the message it sends abroad, seeking a consensus candidate with broad acceptance while avoiding figures who might trouble some allied states. Several Syrian governorates held internal elections and dialogue sittings among their members, most notably Aleppo, whose bloc reached consensus on Muhammad Ramez Korej as its sole candidate after both Mohammed Yassin (who won more than 30 votes in an internal election) and Azzam Khanji withdrew; Damascus, meanwhile, saw members withdraw their candidacies in favour of the president's list, while others preferred to contest the deputy speaker posts, among them rights lawyer Muhammad Suleiman Dahla, the consensus candidate of the Damascus and countryside bloc.

Assembly member Abdulaziz Maghribi described the attempts to form parliamentary groupings, and the divisions and pressures that accompanied them, as natural, given that members entered the Assembly through governorate blocs amid the country's exceptional circumstances and the absence of parties, saying: "We are facing a new parliament elected in the absence of political parties... today we are experiencing a leap in political maturity, and this points to a trend towards what might be classed as a primitive bloc in the race for the presiding bureau." Political writer Abdul Wahab Assi, by contrast, argued that the executive authority's intervention — whether by pressuring the choice of Speaker, delaying the sitting, or intervening in the Assembly's powers — damaged attempts to build a nucleus of member blocs, particularly the larger Aleppo bloc, whose candidate had a high internal vote share that could have rivalled the presidency's preferred candidate. Analyst Darwish Khalifa said he did not believe parliamentary blocs existed in the recognised political sense, "because nominations to the People's Assembly took place individually, and were not based on partisan or ideological groupings, and so the outcome was a consensus-based Assembly speakership."

Reports also said President al-Sharaa hosted Assembly members at a lunch at the People's Palace on 11 July 2026, the day before the first sitting. The President presented members with his vision and rules for the Assembly's work, in what was described as "firm" language, and floated candidates for its speakership, among them Abdul Hamid al-Awak, who was later elected Speaker; writer Ali al-Abdullah, in an opinion piece for An-Nahar, took this as evidence that the executive authority was keen to prevent the emergence of any partisan or regional blocs that might limit its ability to steer the Assembly's work.

== First sitting ==
The People's Assembly held the first sitting of its first special session on 12 July 2026, attended by President Ahmed al-Sharaa, Foreign Minister Asaad al-Shibani, Justice Minister Mazhar al-Wais, Interior Minister Anas Khattab, and the chairman of the Higher Committee for People's Assembly Elections, Muhammad Taha al-Ahmad. For the first time in the history of the Syrian People's Assembly, members collectively took the constitutional oath before the President, and the President's address to the Assembly ended without cheering or applause from the floor, unlike the practice of Assembly sittings under the former regime. President al-Sharaa entered the hall quietly and sat among the members' seats before delivering a brief address in which he called on the Assembly to be "a model of responsibility and competence" and to "contribute to entrenching a culture of dialogue, the rule of law and respect for institutions." The chair was then taken, under the provisional electoral system, by Osama al-Assaf, the oldest member, so that the Assembly could elect its bureau; al-Assaf faced repeated objections from members during the discussion of voting procedures and responded that the Assembly "has no rules and no law of its own, and this is something entirely new." State media broadcast the sitting's proceedings in full, including the discussions, objections and voting results, unlike the coverage of People's Assembly sittings under the former regime.

In his address after his election, al-Awak told the executive authority: "We will cooperate with you, and we will facilitate legislation to the fullest extent we can." Closing the sitting, the newly elected Secretary, Mu'ayyad Habib, said: "History will not record who won today, but how this sitting was conducted, and how Syrians gathered once again under parliament's dome; the assemblies that come after us will follow in our footsteps — if we are weak, they will be weak, and if we are strong, they will be strong."

== Rules of procedure ==
=== Drafting ===
On 17 July 2026, Assembly Speaker Abdul Hamid al-Awak formed a temporary 17-member committee to draft the Assembly's rules of procedure, chaired by Abdul Nasser al-Hawshan and with Hisham al-Afiouni as rapporteur; its other members were Kinan al-Nahhas, Abdul Qader Khoja, Nour Arabo, Tamam al-Loudaami, Ahmad al-Omar, Akram al-Assaf, Saadi Sakriyeh, Khaled al-Salloum, Amjad Ali, Saad al-Shuwaish, Mohammed al-Mudhib, Imad al-Ashrafani, Mahmoud Madi al-Ali, Ayman al-Shuqairi and Samira al-Wattar. The committee began its work on Sunday 19 July and concluded it on the evening of Thursday 23 July, a span of four days, drawing on a preliminary draft that some legally trained members had prepared during the months of waiting that preceded the first sitting, as well as on the rules of procedure of other Arab parliaments, foremost among them those of the Jordanian parliament.

=== Debate and adoption ===
On Sunday 26 July 2026, the Assembly opened the second sitting of its first special session and discussed the bureau's report and the report of the committee tasked with drafting the rules, before proceeding to debate its articles one by one ahead of a vote. At the end of the first day of debate, Speaker al-Awak announced that members had completed 16 articles "after rich contributions and considerable discussion and dialogue among members on every article." The following day (27 July), the Assembly adopted 14 further articles, bringing the total adopted to 30, amid consensus that al-Awak and the rest of the bureau would remain in their posts for the Assembly's full 30-month term, after some members had called for halving that term. The draft rules were debated in closed sittings that were not broadcast live, unlike the opening sitting, which had been broadcast in full, on the grounds that this allowed more room for free discussion among members. The sittings were accompanied by the authorities closing the main roads leading to the Assembly building in the al-Salihiyah district of Damascus, causing traffic paralysis in the heart of the capital's commercial centre and a wave of discontent among residents and merchants, which prompted members themselves to call for the roads to be reopened.

On Tuesday 28 July, Article 30, concerning the naming of the Assembly's committees and defining their remits, failed to win the votes needed for adoption, receiving only 85 votes. The Assembly then picked up its pace, adopting 130 further articles that same day, bringing the total adopted to 160 of 227 (about 60% of the draft), after members were asked to stop unnecessary interventions. By noon the following day (29 July), the number of adopted articles had reached 180, without notable debate or disagreement, including articles on accountability, hearing testimony from the executive authority, and lifting members' immunity. On Thursday 30 July, the Assembly adopted the rules of procedure in their final form by a majority, after five days of article-by-article debate, bringing the total number of articles to 231, arranged in 11 chapters, with 205 of the Assembly's 210 members in attendance. Deputy Speaker Madonna Bishara described the adoption of the rules as the first step towards establishing the institutional framework governing the Assembly's work, calling the coming phase a "legislative revolution" given the scale of the responsibilities facing the Assembly; Secretary Mu'ayyad Habib, for his part, described the debate as "the broadest parliamentary debate the Assembly's dome has witnessed in decades," noting that some articles drew more than 50 interventions.

=== Diplomatic and Consular Affairs Committee controversy ===
The initial draft of the rules of procedure did not include a committee dedicated to foreign affairs, unlike most of the world's parliaments and unlike the previous rules of procedure, which had featured an "Arab and Foreign Affairs Committee"; the committee's absence sparked widespread controversy on social media and within the Assembly, with a number of members insisting the article on committees not be adopted without it. A source inside the Assembly told the website Ultra Syria that the committee had not been dropped at any stage, and that talk of its removal was "incorrect." On 28 July, the Assembly re-formed the committee under a new name, the "Diplomatic and Consular Affairs Committee," retaining its traditional remit of following the work of the Ministry of Foreign Affairs and international parliamentary relations, studying international agreements, discussing foreign policy, questioning the foreign minister, and submitting recommendations to the Assembly.

Views differed on the significance of the name change. Governance expert Rabal al-Zein argued that having committee chairs, vice-chairs and rapporteurs appointed by the executive bureau, rather than elected from within each committee as had previously been the practice, "is not a technical matter," since it could turn the Legislation and Constitutional Affairs Committee into a "mandatory gateway" and a "bureaucratic bottleneck" capable of stalling legislation or reshaping it before it reached public debate; he linked this to the removal of the "vote of no confidence" tool against officials under the new rules, arguing that this "leads to the diminishing of the Assembly's oversight bodies and tools." Samer Dhi'i, director of the "Free Syrian Jurists' League," by contrast, viewed the committee's creation as a necessary completion of the Assembly's institutional structure enabling it to exercise its constitutional powers, particularly ratifying international treaties and overseeing foreign-relations files at a stage of rebuilding international relations, lifting sanctions and reconstruction; he noted, however, that the name "Diplomatic and Consular Affairs" was narrower than "Foreign Affairs," and that dropping the word "expatriates" from the name deserved attention given the connection of millions of Syrians abroad to documentation, passport and status-regularisation issues, calling for the committee to be given genuine oversight tools, chief among them mandatory referral of draft treaties to it before they are put to the general assembly, the power to summon the foreign minister, and early access to agreements before they are signed. Assembly member Yasser ash-Shahada, for his part, considered talk of "creating" the committee to involve "a degree of exaggeration," explaining that the Assembly had adopted several new committees during its debates besides this one alone, among them the reconstruction and the martyrs and navigation committees, and that the committee's remit was limited to studying legislation related to diplomatic and consular affairs, while ratifying international agreements remained the prerogative of the Assembly's general body as a whole. Assembly member Abdul Mawla al-Hariri, representing Daraa Governorate, acknowledged that some members had proposed abolishing the foreign relations committee, which others rejected, leading to amendments, saying: "I personally am not satisfied with it, but we work under the rule of law and respect for the majority vote."

The Lebanese newspaper Al-Akhbar, in an analysis, argued that excluding foreign affairs and international agreements from legislative oversight, by not forming a committee named "Foreign Affairs" and settling instead for a "Diplomatic and Consular Affairs" committee, exposed a power structure — comprising the presidency, the foreign ministry and the security services — that stood above oversight institutions and whose decisions were not accountable even to the People's Assembly itself, in the context of foreign policy being concentrated in the hands of the foreign ministry in parallel with the formation of a "National Security Council" in March 2025, whose management was entrusted to Interior Minister Anas Khattab.

=== Key provisions ===
According to what has been published of its articles, the rules of procedure include the following:

- Term of the Assembly and bureau: the Assembly's term runs for 30 months, renewable under the Constitutional Declaration, and the Speaker, the two deputy speakers and the secretary remain in their posts for the full term, with a third of members entitled to submit a reasoned request to withdraw the membership of a bureau member.
- Sessions: the Assembly holds three ordinary sessions a year and may be called into special session at the request of the President, a third of members, or the Assembly's bureau.
- Openness and voting: Assembly sittings are, as a rule, public and broadcast by means determined by the bureau, with the possibility of halting the broadcast on a reasoned request; voting, too, is public as a rule, except in exceptional cases adopted by a majority. A closed sitting is held at the request of the President, the Speaker, or a tenth of members, for reasons related to national security.
- Absolute majority: laws on elections, parties, the judicial authority, the council of state, the Supreme Constitutional Court, and transitional justice require the approval of an absolute majority of Assembly members.
- Relationship with the presidency: draft laws submitted by the President are placed on the agenda of the first sitting following their receipt and referred to the competent committee, which has the right to review their legal drafting; the President has the right to object to any law adopted by the Assembly within a month of receiving it, provided the objection is reasoned; international treaties and agreements are likewise referred by the President to the Assembly for ratification or rejection, and the President has the right to propose amending the Constitutional Declaration, subject to a vote by the Assembly.
- Immunity and prohibitions: no penal measures may be taken against any member, nor may a member be suspended or arrested, except when caught in the act of a flagrant offence; the rules prohibit members from glorifying the former regime or denying its crimes, and likewise prohibit calling for the secession or partition of any part of Syria under any name.
- Limits of oversight: the rules allow for hearing sittings with ministers, questioning them, and debating the general budget, but do not grant the Assembly a "vote of no confidence" tool against the government or any minister, since the formation of the government does not in the first place require the Assembly's confidence.

In an extended analysis of the rules' provisions, journalist Menhel Bareesh observed that Articles 21, 22 and 23 grant the Speaker broad organisational and administrative powers as the Assembly's representative, the supervisor of the rules' implementation, and the organiser of the institution's work and relations, while the two deputy speakers' role remains closer to assisting him and standing in for him in his absence; combining the management of sittings, representation, administrative supervision and influence over the formation of committee chairmanships in the hands of a single Speaker, with the bureau remaining in place for the whole term, gives him the ability to steer the Assembly's legislative and oversight priorities. He also considered the openness of sittings "a rule subject to restriction" as long as the bureau controls the means of broadcast and the criteria for halting it or shifting to secrecy have not yet been published, and that the value of open voting depends on publishing results by members' names rather than by vote totals alone; he concluded that oversight "without a vote of no confidence" remains contingent on how far officials are obliged to attend and answer, and on the possibility of escalating questioning into a general debate or an inquiry committee.

=== Suspension of sittings after adoption ===
The Assembly did not meet again for more than a month after adopting the rules of procedure on 30 July. Assembly member Kinan al-Nahhas explained, in a Facebook post dated 24 August 2026, that this was due to two reasons: the text of the rules of procedure had not yet been published in the Official Gazette despite this "supposedly" being a priority, and the expenses needed for the Assembly's work had not been covered, owing to what appeared to him to be either a liquidity shortfall or a dispute between the Assembly's bureau and an official body over their financial coverage; he noted that the rules of procedure refer the study and adoption of the Assembly's budget to the Assembly itself, without direct intervention from any government ministry, in keeping with parliamentary custom in Syria and elsewhere. Because sittings had stopped, members had not been briefed on the state budget for 2026, nor were they able to formally pursue the case of Mohammed Ghmeira within the Assembly, despite coordinating informally to prepare their files in anticipation of sittings resuming. Ghmeira is not a member of the Assembly, but a young Syrian man who died after being detained at a police station, in an incident that sparked controversy, with some accusing the security authorities of torturing him in a manner that led to his death.

In this context, Fadel Abdul Ghani, director of the Syrian Network for Human Rights, argued that the Constitutional Declaration contains no provision preventing the Assembly from continuing to meet before its rules of procedure are published in the Official Gazette, and that Article 29 of the Declaration obliges the Assembly to prepare its rules of procedure within a month of its first sitting, but does not make publication a condition for continuing to meet, since the Assembly's legislative and oversight powers derive their legitimacy from the Constitutional Declaration itself, not from the rules of procedure alone; he stressed, however, the need to distinguish between continuing to meet and using rules of procedure unavailable to the public to take decisions affecting members' rights or the integrity of the legislative process, arguing that publishing the full text of the rules, budget transparency, open sittings and documenting decisions were the practical guarantees enabling Syrians to hold both the Assembly and the government accountable, and that "no authority has the right to interfere in the powers of the People's Assembly as defined by the Constitutional Declaration, whether by imposing the agenda, obstructing the work of committees, influencing voting, or using financial resources to weaken the Assembly's ability to legislate and provide oversight." The rules of procedure were published in the Official Gazette shortly before the end of August 2026, according to al-Nahhas's later confirmation.

== Committees ==
Following the adoption of the rules of procedure on 30 July, and Decision No. 109 of 2026 issued by Assembly Speaker Abdul Hamid al-Awak on 28 August 2026, the Assembly came to have 26 standing committees. The decision was based on paragraph 1 of Article 30 and paragraph 8 of Article 22 of the rules of procedure, and on meetings held by the Assembly's bureau on 7, 8, 12, 19 and 26 August 2026. Under the rules of procedure, each member may join up to two committees, provided that the chair of one committee is not a member of another, and committee membership ranges between 7 and 17 members. Women chaired six of the 26 committees, a proportion described as relatively acceptable given the generally limited representation of women in the Assembly as a whole.

Three of the 26 committees were regarded as "sovereign committees" in which the Syrian presidency played the leading role in naming their members: the Diplomatic and Consular Affairs Committee, the Defence, National Security and Emergency Committee, and the Public Freedoms and Human Rights Committee; the Diplomatic and Consular Affairs Committee, with 17 members, was described as "the most important committee in the Assembly," and lawyer Samira al-Wattar was chosen to chair it in the interest of Syria's external image, while Nawar Najma was chosen as its vice-chair for his good relations with the political circle linked to the foreign ministry. The committee-formation stage saw a repeat of the same controversy that had accompanied the adoption of the rules of procedure, with sources saying the first test the Assembly faced at this stage was a decision to abolish the Diplomatic and Consular Affairs Committee, which sparked a wave of sharp criticism within the Assembly that led to it being reversed.

The committee membership lists did not include the name of Kurdish leader Ilham Ahmad, formerly head of foreign relations in the Autonomous Administration, pending a presidential decree appointing her within the supplementary third, to take the place of MPA Mudar Hamdan, who resigned his membership in August 2026 amid accusations of being among the "remnants of the former regime"; parliamentary sources denied to Asharq Al-Awsat any official confirmation of Ahmad's appointment as of that time. Among the other vacant seats was that of Idlib Governorate, vacated by the death of MPA Muhammad Mustafa Kalthoum, and the three seats of Suwayda Governorate, where elections had not yet been held.

According to parliamentary sources, the formation of the committees was delayed owing to their sheer number, and it was decided that the Assembly would begin its legislative work in the second week of September 2026, with priority given to the transitional justice law, on which the trial of more than 6,000 detainees among the remnants of the former regime would be based.

The Syrian Arab News Agency grouped the 26 committees into broad categories: legislative and financial, such as constitutional and legislative affairs, budget and accounts, financial laws, and economic affairs; service and development, such as education, higher education, health, agriculture, energy, transport and tourism and culture; administrative, economic and technical, such as local administration, investment and reconstruction, crossings and customs, and communications and digital transformation, and political, security and human-rights related, such as defence and national security, diplomatic and consular affairs and public freedoms and human rights, in addition to media, social affairs and labour, youth and sports, family and women, and endowments and religious affairs.

An analytical article argued that the committees' greatest challenges lay in the shortage of time, given that a number of ministries, civil-society organisations and some political currents had submitted ready-made draft laws in their fields for the committees to use as reference material, which was described as a "double-edged sword" that saves time but places heavy responsibility on choosing the most suitable wording, in addition to the challenge of setting priorities between what the Syrian leadership sees as most pressing and what Syrians themselves see as most pressing, foremost among them the parties law.

Committee	Bureau		Party
Victims and Martyrs of the Revolution Affairs Committee	Chair	Ayman Shamo	Independent
Victims and Martyrs of the Revolution Affairs Committee	Vice-Chair	Mervat Toto	Independent
Agriculture and Food Security Committee	Chair	Israa al-Mashhour	Independent
Agriculture and Food Security Committee	Vice-Chair	Hammoud al-Hassan al-Hamoud	Independent
Budget and Accounts Committee	Chair	Amin al-Bashir	Independent
Budget and Accounts Committee	Vice-Chair	Husam al-Din Razma	Independent
Communications, Digital Transformation and Information Technology Committee	Chair	Lara Qadid	Independent
Communications, Digital Transformation and Information Technology Committee	Vice-Chair	Samer Qara Ali	Independent
Constitutional and Legislative Affairs Committee	Chair	Abdul Nasser al-Hawshan	Independent
Constitutional and Legislative Affairs Committee	Vice-Chair	Hassan Daghim	Independent
Culture, Heritage and Cultural Diversity Committee	Chair	Tariq Salou	Independent
Culture, Heritage and Cultural Diversity Committee	Vice-Chair	Nizar ar-Rashdan	Independent
Defence, National Security and Emergency Committee	Chair	Khaldoun al-Ahmad	Independent
Defence, National Security and Emergency Committee	Vice-Chair	Munther Saras	Independent
Diplomatic and Consular Affairs Committee	Chair	Samira al-Wattar	Independent
Diplomatic and Consular Affairs Committee	Vice-Chair	Nawar Najma	Independent
Economic Affairs Committee	Chair	Lina Aizouqi	Independent
Economic Affairs Committee	Vice-Chair	Abdullah al-Zayed	Independent
Education Committee	Chair	Waddah Rajab	Independent
Education Committee	Vice-Chair	Abdul-Fattah Obaid	Independent
Endowments, Religious Affairs and Fatwa Committee	Chair	Adnan al-Khatib	Independent
Endowments, Religious Affairs and Fatwa Committee	Vice-Chair	Subh al-Badah	Independent
Energy Committee	Chair	Iqbal Mansour	Independent
Energy Committee	Vice-Chair	Abdul-Karim Akidi	Independent
Family and Women Committee	Chair	Asma al-Saba'i	Independent
Family and Women Committee	Vice-Chair	Rankin Abdo	Independent
Financial Laws Committee	Chair	Mustafa Akoush	Independent
Financial Laws Committee	Vice-Chair	Adnan al-Masalma	Independent
Health Committee	Chair	Arif Razzuq	Independent
Health Committee	Vice-Chair	Aws Othman	Independent
Higher Education and Scientific Research Committee	Chair	Ahmad al-Afdal	Independent
Higher Education and Scientific Research Committee	Vice-Chair	Muhammad Ramez Korej	Independent
Investment, Reconstruction and Sustainable Development Committee	Chair	Husam al-Din Tatari	Independent
Investment, Reconstruction and Sustainable Development Committee	Vice-Chair	Ayesh az-Zarqa	Independent
Local Administration and Development Committee	Chair	Imad al-Ashrafani	Independent
Local Administration and Development Committee	Vice-Chair	Mahmoud al-Uweis	Independent
Media Committee	Chair	Mouayad Ghazlan al-Qablawi	Independent
Media Committee	Vice-Chair	Mohammed Balas	Independent
Public Crossings and Customs Committee	Chair	Muhammad Surur al-Mudhib	Independent
Public Crossings and Customs Committee	Vice-Chair	Abdul-Razzaq Rayes	Independent
Public Freedoms and Human Rights Committee	Chair	Hassan Soufan	Independent
Public Freedoms and Human Rights Committee	Vice-Chair	Yasser ash-Shahada	Independent
Social Affairs and Labour Committee	Chair	Mahmoud Mustafa	Independent
Social Affairs and Labour Committee	Vice-Chair	Alwan al-Ali	Independent
Tourism Committee	Chair	Mahmoud al-Ali	Independent
Tourism Committee	Vice-Chair	Ali Masoud	Independent
Transitional Justice and Civil Peace Committee	Chair	Osama al-Assaf	Independent
Transitional Justice and Civil Peace Committee	Vice-Chair	Maher Alloush	Independent
Transport and Navigation Committee	Chair	Kim Ibrahim	Independent
Transport and Navigation Committee	Vice-Chair	Muhammad al-Mahali	Independent
Youth and Sports Committee	Chair	Wajdi Zaido	Independent
Youth and Sports Committee	Vice-Chair	Osama an-Na'ous	Independent

== Subsequent developments ==
The People's Assembly held its third sitting on Sunday 13 September 2026, with the resignation of MPA Mudar Hamdan and the abolition of the Counter-Terrorism Court topping its agenda.

Hamdan had submitted his resignation from Assembly membership in August 2026, citing "systematic defamatory online campaigns" that had damaged his reputation, and describing the accusations against him as "fabricated lies and false claims," adding that continuing in his membership risked hampering the Assembly's legislative work. Hamdan described his decision as "voluntary and responsible," motivated by "genuine concern for the nation" and a desire to preserve the Assembly's standing. Around 190 of the Assembly's 210 members attended the sitting.

The acceptance of the resignation followed the formation of a special committee that investigated the suspicions raised about Hamdan and heard his testimony, before the Assembly debated his resignation request on the floor and approved it, with some phrases deleted from the resignation letter; Nawar Najma, vice-chair of the Diplomatic and Consular Affairs Committee, said the Assembly had accepted the resignation formally but had reservations about phrases within it, such as Hamdan's references to "campaigns against him" and to "leaving with his head held high." Earlier, in June 2026, Hamdan had denied reports concerning his father's military rank in the former regime's army, explaining that his father had been a "former military lecturer" who had been arrested, tortured and discharged. At the same sitting, the Assembly adopted its internal budget. The acceptance of the resignation created a new vacancy within the presidential third, which could be filled by a presidential decree appointing former Kurdish leader Ilham Ahmad to the Assembly.

The Assembly also discussed, at the same sitting, three legislative proposals addressing exceptional laws issued under the former regime, framed as applying the principles of transitional justice and the provisions of the Constitutional Declaration:

- an amendment to the pensions law separating criminal penalties from retirement rights for those convicted on terrorism charges;
- a tax exemption, from taxes and transfer fees, for individuals whose confiscated property had been returned to them, covering the period between 15 March 2011 and 8 December 2024; and
- the repeal of Law No. 22 of 2012, which established the counter-terrorism court, with the Supreme Judicial Council to annul its unjust rulings and return property confiscated under it.

On 11 September 2026, sources inside the Assembly told the website Ultra Syria that the Assembly's Education Committee had summoned Education Minister Mohammed Abdul Rahman Turko to a hearing session scheduled for the following week, to discuss files relating to the education sector, chief among them the file of dismissed teaching and educational staff, as well as decisions on education policy and errors that had accompanied some procedures; this was framed as part of the Assembly's oversight role of inquiry and seeking clarification on ministry matters that had raised questions in the preceding period. The ministry had recently announced receiving more than 173,000 electronic applications through an app for securing teaching staff. The Assembly duly heard Education Minister Mohammed Abdul Rahman Turko at its sitting on Monday 14 September 2026.

On 16 September, the assembly unanimously approved a bill abolishing the Assad-era Counter-Terrorism Court and nullifying its legal rulings. The law provides for the Supreme Judicial Council to form judicial committees to remove the effects of the court's rulings, including returning confiscated property, and to dismiss pending cases or refer them to the competent judicial authority, while decisions the council had already taken on the matter before the law came into force are deemed valid. People whose property is returned after being confiscated under rulings of the Counter-Terrorism Court, the military field courts or the military courts are exempted from taxes and fees for the period from 15 March 2011 to 8 December 2024. Fadel Abdul Ghani said the Syrian Network for Human Rights had documented, up to October 2020, at least 10,767 people tried before the court in around 90,560 cases, along with 3,970 seizures of property. The Ministry of Justice said exceptional measures such as travel bans and asset freezes had by then been lifted in 38,566 of 49,726 cases, and that the total number of people relieved of such measures had reached nearly 130,000.

=== Fuel price increase and protests ===
On the evening of Saturday 13 September 2026, the government announced an increase in fuel prices of between 25% and 40%, attributing the decision to an "exceptional rise in the global cost of securing fuel" coinciding with maintenance work at the Baniyas refinery, and describing it as a temporary measure linked to exceptional circumstances. Widespread protests against the decision broke out on 13 and 14 September in several areas of Syria, including burning tyres and road blockages in the town of al-Shuhayl in the Deir ez-Zor countryside, protests by public-transport drivers in Raqqa and Tabqa, road blockages in front of fuel tankers in al-Hasakah, blocking of the international highway in Idlib and Maarat al-Numan, sit-ins in the towns of Mare', al-Bab and Azaz in the Aleppo countryside, and protests in Hama; protesters linked the decision to low monthly public-sector salaries, which do not exceed US$150, arguing that it burdened an economy that had "just emerged from 14 years of destruction."

On 14 September, the Assembly's bureau approved a request by MPA Iqbal Mansour, chair of the Energy Committee, to hold a hearing session with the energy minister, under Article 30 of the Constitutional Declaration and Article 168 of the Assembly's rules of procedure, to discuss the fuel-price bulletin issued and the reasons for and circumstances surrounding the increase; the hearing was initially scheduled for Thursday 17 September 2026.

=== Hearing sessions with ministers ===
Article 30 of the Constitutional Declaration lists holding hearing sessions for ministers among the Assembly's functions, and the rules of procedure adopted on 30 July 2026 define a hearing as a means of hearing clarifications from an official or the head of a body about a policy, procedure, act or incident, which may be requested by a committee or by 21 members. The new Assembly's first hearing was with Education Minister Mohammed Turko on Monday 14 September 2026, covering the unification of curricula, the integration of people with disabilities, the situation of teachers and of students returning from abroad, and the ministry's plans.

The energy hearing was postponed from Thursday 17 September to Sunday 20 September 2026, and its scope was widened to cover oil, electricity, water resources and mining; Asharq Al-Awsat linked the postponement to a meeting on Wednesday 16 September between President al-Sharaa and the energy minister, which it said appeared to have prompted the postponement and gave the executive time to review the decision. At a press conference on 17 September, Energy Minister Mohammed al-Bashir announced that subsidised diesel would be allocated at 115 lira per litre, that several grades of diesel at different prices and specifications would be offered, and that limited-capacity local electric refineries would be brought back into operation; the newspaper noted domestic output of about 100,000 barrels per day against estimated needs of 300,000 to 350,000. At the hearing on 20 September, al-Bashir defended the price rise. According to Al-Watan, he set out the reasons for the increase, the difficulties of securing oil derivatives, and figures on oil and gas production and import costs; Deputy Speaker Mustafa al-Mousa later said that a file of questions left unanswered at the hearing had been sent to the ministry for reply, and that the Energy Committee was following up the fuel file with it.

Iqbal Mansour, chair of the Energy Committee, said that if a minister declines to appear, withholds information or supplies inaccurate figures, the rules of procedure give the Assembly four options: requesting a recommendation session addressed to the Presidency, requesting a second hearing, referring the matter to the competent committee, or requesting documents on the subject. Assembly member Nour Jandali said that the Assembly could not overturn the government's decision but could expose shortcomings and, where a problem stemmed from legislation, address it through its own tools.

Commentators stressed the limits of the mechanism. Lawyer Mu'tasim al-Kilani told Al Jazeera that the Constitutional Declaration provides for "hearing sessions" rather than accountability in the full parliamentary sense, since political accountability ordinarily implies a possible sanction such as a vote of no confidence or dismissal, powers the Declaration does not give the Assembly; the Assembly can hear ministers, discuss their performance, request clarifications and expose shortcomings. Ahmad Qorbi, director of the Syrian Dialogue Centre, attributed this to a presidential system that restricts the legislature from withdrawing confidence from ministers and makes the government answerable to the president alone; he did not expect strong recommendations, saying the hearing's value lay in placing the minister's answers on the public record. Arif al-Shaal, a member of the Supreme Constitutional Court, likewise said that under the Declaration the Assembly can hold hearings but has no power of accountability, interpellation or withdrawing confidence, which some might regard as a gap in the state's structure.

=== Proposal to repeal Law No. 49 of 1980 ===
In September 2026, reports emerged that members of the Assembly were moving to repeal Law No. 49 of 1980, which made membership of the Muslim Brotherhood punishable by death. The law was passed by the then People's Assembly on 7 July 1980 and ratified by President Hafez al-Assad the following day; it treated every member of the organisation as a criminal without requiring any act of violence, and was enacted in response to an armed escalation by the Fighting Vanguard. Reports differed on the extent of support for the move: an opinion piece published by Elaph spoke of more than ten members, while Al-Akhbar reported more than 40 and said the proposal had been submitted to the Assembly's leadership, quoting member Kinan al-Nahhas as saying it would repeal the law definitively, address the rulings issued under it and rehabilitate its victims and their families. Abdul Nasser al-Hawshan, chair of the Constitutional and Legislative Affairs Committee, told Asharq Al-Awsat that the proposal was still at the signature-gathering stage and had not been submitted, and that the rules of procedure require the approval of 17 members before a bill is drafted and referred to the competent committee; the newspaper noted that this indicated that the steps needed to bring it before the Assembly were incomplete, despite media leaks that it might be discussed at the sitting expected in mid-October.

The law's legal status was itself unclear: the declaration issued by the Victory Conference on 29 January 2025 suspended all exceptional laws, but it was not clear whether this covered Law No. 49 or whether a legislative repeal was still required; the declaration dissolved the Ba'ath Party and the parties of the National Progressive Front but did not dissolve all political parties. Researcher Hussam Jazmati expected broad support for repeal inside and outside the Assembly, given the abuses associated with the law, while researcher Abdulrahman al-Hajj described the move as a test of the transitional authorities' political will, suggesting that an indefinite delay could be read as a sign that they did not want to ease the Brotherhood's return to political activity.

On 27 September 2026, the Brotherhood's Shura Council concluded its fifth regular session of the year with a 16-point statement saying that the group would remain a national organisation independent in its decision. The statement welcomed the opening of the Assembly and stressed its role in completing the transitional period and establishing organised political pluralism, and called for a permanent constitution to be put to a referendum, a serious transitional justice process, and regulation of party activity. Al-Akhbar reported that the group had rejected calls to dissolve itself, noting that it had no declared legal status or visible offices inside Syria and that its General Overseer since 2023 was Amer Abu Salama. Mulhim al-Droubi, a former member of the group's leadership, said he had advocated dissolution, that the Shura Council had rejected it by majority, and that he had resigned in August 2025.

== First ordinary session ==
The first ordinary session of the first legislative term opened on Sunday 18 October 2026. Al-Watan described it as the Assembly's third and final session of the year. Deputy Speaker Mustafa al-Mousa said it had no fixed duration and could last days, a week or two weeks, depending on the matters before the Assembly.

=== First sitting (18–20 October) ===
The first sitting of the ordinary session ran over three days. On its first day, the Assembly heard a summary of the closing sitting of the special session and the written answers of the education and energy ministers to members' questions; the Education and Energy committees were to draw up memoranda setting out members' comments on the answers. The Assembly also approved a proposal by the executive committee of the Syrian Arab Parliamentary Division to form a four-member delegation representing the Assembly in the Arab Parliament. Abdul Nasser al-Hawshan, chair of the Constitutional and Legislative Affairs Committee, said efforts were under way to return the Arab Parliament's headquarters to Damascus, describing the city as its original seat before it was moved to Cairo at the start of the revolution.

The sitting closed on 20 October with the repeal of Law No. 143 of 1958, which had allowed the education minister to issue decisions seizing any property he deemed necessary for the ministry's work. The repeal bill had been submitted by the Presidency, and the remaining bills on the agenda were referred to the competent committees. The Syrian Observer, citing Al-Thawra, reported that the repeal passed with 95.77% of the vote. (Note: Some reports said the Assembly had voted to repeal Law No. 521 of 1955, which gave the education minister a similar power, while the Syrian Arab News Agency and other sources named the repealed law as Law No. 143 of 1958.) The bills referred to committees included:

- a bill amending Article 364 bis of the Penal Code, issued by Legislative Decree No. 148 of 1949, which penalises public- and mixed-sector employees who leave or abandon their posts before their resignation is accepted. According to al-Hawshan, the amendment would reduce the penalty from six months to three years' imprisonment to three months to one year, or a fine. He added that members were considering repealing the article altogether and moving its provisions into the new universities law and the forthcoming civil service law;
- a bill repealing Law No. 36 of 2014, which reserves 50% of vacancies in public-sector recruitment competitions for the families of "martyrs" and those treated as such. The law's definition of a martyr covers soldiers, members of the internal security forces and civilians working under army command, as well as state employees killed on duty or because of their work; Legislative Decree No. 22 of 2017 kept the share at 50% and added brothers and sisters to the beneficiaries. Al-Hawshan said the law had given the families of members of the National Defence Forces and allied militias a privilege that violated the Constitutional Declaration's prohibition of discrimination; and
- a proposal by 22 members to repeal Law No. 41 of 2004 on property transactions in border areas (see below).

==== Law No. 41 of 2004 ====
Law No. 41 of 2004 requires prior licensing to create, transfer, modify or acquire real rights over property in border areas, and to lease or invest in property for more than three years. The restrictions were tightened by Legislative Decree No. 49 of 2008 and partly eased by Decree No. 43 of 2011, which exempted property within zoning plans. Their effects extended to Al-Hasakah Governorate and the Ayn al-Arab and Afrin areas. MPA Radwan Sido, representing Al-Hasakah, said the law had deprived some Kurds in these areas of the ability to register or dispose of their property, and called for it and the amending decrees to be repealed as contrary to the equality of citizens set out in the Constitutional Declaration.

The Constitutional and Legislative Affairs Committee, however, recommended amending rather than repealing the law. Its chair, al-Hawshan, said repeal "conflicts with national security", since every state regulates its border areas. He said the former regime had amended the law repeatedly in order to extort property owners, and that obtaining a licence had required the approval of the Political Security and Military Intelligence branches. He proposed writing into the law a deadline for issuing licences, such as the 15-day period set in the executive instructions, after which an application would be deemed approved. The file was referred to the Defence and National Security Committee and the Investment Committee for study in coordination with the ministries of defence, interior and agriculture.

==== Law No. 36 of 2014 ====
On 29 October, the Victims and Martyrs of the Revolution Affairs Committee and the Family and Women Committee discussed proposals to amend Law No. 36 of 2014 at a joint meeting, and called for a clear legal definition of a martyr of the Syrian revolution. On 3 November, MPA Kinan al-Nahhas, representing Homs, proposed amending the law instead of repealing it outright. His proposal would include martyrs of the revolution between 2011 and 2024, among them those who died in prisons and security branches; cut the reserved share to 20%, falling gradually over time; keep the law in force for at least ten years; and form a committee to review the status of those appointed under it between 2014 and 2024. On 6 November, the Victims Committee and the Social Affairs and Labour Committee, meeting jointly, asked the relevant bodies for further documents and statistical data before drafting their final report.

=== Slow arrival of government bills ===
After the first sitting, members said the Assembly's leadership had asked ministries to speed up submitting their bills to the Presidency's General Secretariat or to the Constitutional and Legislative Affairs Committee. They said the Assembly had so far dealt only with bills from the Presidency and proposals from members, and had not received any bill from executive institutions. Some members said this left them answerable to the public for the executive's shortcomings and exposed them to accusations of "legislative stagnation". Al-Nahhas said the Assembly was suffering from "unemployment" caused by its few sittings and the government's delay in sending bills, and proposed holding more sittings. Al-Mousa acknowledged that the Assembly's work was slow but described its steps as deliberate, saying committees met ministries before bills arrived in order to form a full picture of them.

Member Abdul Razzaq Awad said the laws put forward at the first sittings, though important, did not necessarily reflect Syrians' most pressing priorities. Fellow member Muhammad al-Bakir said the Assembly's success should be measured by its ability to protect rights, fight corruption and improve Syrians' lives, not by the number of laws it passed. Hassan Daghim, representing Idlib, said priorities were "scattered", criticising the placing of more than 400 laws on the table at once, and named the return of around 77,000 arbitrarily dismissed employees to their jobs among the most urgent files.

=== Second sitting (8–10 November) ===
The next sitting was postponed to 8 November to give committees time to study the bills referred to them, and pending the arrival of further bills. Before it convened, al-Mousa said around ten bills had reached the Assembly. They included a bill repealing Law No. 53 of 1979 on the security of the Ba'ath Party, which imposed severe penalties, up to death, on anyone attacking the party, and a bill repealing Decree No. 4 of 1965, which criminalised opposing or obstructing the implementation of the socialist system. The agenda also included:

- bills amending tourism service fees and fines;
- a bill on the tax status of taxpayers whose places of business were in areas outside the former regime's control as of 8 December 2024, exempting them from tax liabilities for the period from 2011 to the end of 2025;
- a bill unifying the rules on precautionary seizure;
- a bill establishing a public authority for Hama University Hospital; and
- a bill regulating international trade in endangered wild species.

On the second day of the sitting, Monday 9 November, the Assembly passed a bill repealing "all legal provisions that bar the right to litigation or immunise any administrative act or decision from review by the competent judiciary, wherever they appear in legislation in force". The Constitutional and Legislative Affairs Committee had found the bill admissible and proposed putting it straight to a vote, as there was no specialised committee to refer it to. Its explanatory memorandum, issued by the Presidency's General Secretariat, cited Article 48 of the Constitutional Declaration, which requires the repeal of exceptional laws, and Article 17, which prohibits immunising any administrative act or decision from judicial review. Speaker al-Awak said the law restored to Syrians a right they had been denied for some 60 years. He gave the examples of dismissals from public employment and of decisions by the second expropriation committee, which could not be challenged however small the compensation. He said the law would apply "without retroactive effect", in order to preserve the stability of legal transactions.

At the same sitting, other bills were referred to committees:

- the bills repealing the Ba'ath Party security law and the penalties for resisting socialist legislation, to the Constitutional and Legislative Affairs Committee, for study in coordination with the executive;
- the bill establishing the Hama University Hospital authority, to the Higher Education and Health committees;
- the bill protecting endangered species, to the Agriculture Committee; and
- the bill on fees and fines for tourist establishments, to the Financial Laws, Tourism and Religious Affairs committees. The referral to the Religious Affairs Committee was made at a member's suggestion, as part of the fees concern Umrah pilgrimages.

US Special Envoy for Syria and Iraq Tom Barrack congratulated Syrians on what he described as the opening of the Assembly's second session. He said its leadership had "a rare opportunity" to turn it from an instrument of power into a source of legitimacy grounded in representation, accountability and the rule of law.

=== Parliamentary code of conduct ===
On 5 November 2026, the Assembly announced that the Constitutional and Legislative Affairs Committee had submitted a preliminary draft parliamentary code of conduct to its leadership. The draft was prepared under paragraph 4 of Article 35 of the rules of procedure and placed on the agenda of the following sitting. The committee's vice-chair, Hisham al-Afiouni, said the draft covers members' conduct inside and outside the Assembly, including on social media, prohibits exploiting parliamentary status and requires the disclosure of conflicts of interest. A dedicated committee would monitor compliance and receive complaints, applying graduated measures ranging from a warning and a written notice to censure and the referral of serious violations to the competent body under the rules of procedure. Al-Afiouni said the code creates no penalties beyond those allowed by the rules of procedure, and distinguishes between misconduct and political disagreement, which does not count as a violation. Al-Hawshan said the code was expected to be debated at upcoming sittings.

=== Committee work ===
- Constitutional and Legislative Affairs: on 20 October, the committee's chair, al-Hawshan, discussed coordination with Issam al-Khalif, president of the Supreme Constitutional Court, particularly on constitutional review of laws. On 25 October, Speaker al-Awak and members of the committee met Justice Minister Mazhar al-Wais, who said the ministry would soon send a set of bills to the Assembly. Al-Hawshan said Syria needed around 7,500 judges, against an estimated 3,500 currently serving, and that the justice ministry was working on amending the judicial authority law.
- Education: the committee's chair, Waddah Rajab, said that after the hearing with the minister the committee had sent the ministry scheduled written questions and tied his commitments to timetables and performance indicators. He added that the committee was awaiting a package of bills on developing education, protecting teachers and granting them immunity, and updating the laws on private and vocational education; committee member Mohammed Fadi al-Halabi said the education ministry had sent ten bills to the Presidency. The committee was working on a legislative framework or binding recommendation to settle the status of teachers dismissed for political or security reasons, and was awaiting the civil service law to settle the status of contract teachers in northern Syria. On 4 November, the committee began a round of consultations with teaching staff in the governorates on the education ministry's bills, starting in Tartus.
- Social Affairs and Labour: on 30 October, Administrative Development Minister Mohammed Hassan al-Sakkaf presented the civil service bill to the committee. The 77-page bill, arranged in nine chapters, is intended to replace Basic Law No. 50 of 2004 on state employees. The committee's chair, Mahmoud Mustafa, said the ministry had sent the bill to the Presidency's General Secretariat for referral to the Assembly.
- Media: the committee, chaired by Mouayad al-Qablawi, met on 23 October and on 2, 4 and 5 November to prepare a new media law, holding talks with the heads of ministries' media offices and later with independent journalists and content creators from Daraa and Quneitra. The information minister had announced in September that the bill was complete and that it would abolish prison sentences in cases linked to media work. The Syrian Journalists Union said it had not been invited to the committee's recent meetings, and called for private and public media outlets and independent journalists to be included in the discussions.
- Budget and Accounts: on 20 October, members of the budget, financial laws, economic and agriculture committees met Finance Minister Mohammed Yisr Barnieh, who said the 2027 budget was in its final stages; the two sides agreed to meet monthly. The Budget Committee's chair, Amin al-Bashir, said legislative procedure required the 2027 budget to be adopted before the end of the year, failing which a provisional twelfths budget would be used. The minister reportedly presented the budget preparation committee with a structure of two complementary budgets, one for the administrative sector and one for independent economic institutions and holding companies, described as a first for Syria.
- Other committees:
  - the Agriculture and Food Security Committee, chaired by Israa al-Mashhour, discussed the needs of Deir ez-Zor, Raqqa and Al-Hasakah governorates and the updating of agricultural legislation with Agriculture Minister Basel al-Suwaidan;
  - the Defence, National Security and Emergency Committee, chaired by Khaldoun al-Ahmad, studied developing the legislative framework for the army, police and emergency services;
  - the Transport and Navigation Committee discussed the traffic bill;
  - the Local Administration Committee discussed with Minister Mohammed Anjarani the amendment of Local Administration Law No. 107 and the move towards administrative decentralisation;
  - the Religious Affairs Committee was following the endowments ministry's amendment of Law No. 31 of 2018 and studying how five countries manage religious endowments; and
  - the Culture, Heritage and Cultural Diversity Committee, chaired by Tariq Salou, drew up a plan to develop legislation on cultural production.

=== Relations with the executive ===
Mustafa Akoush, chair of the Financial Laws Committee, said the Assembly had played a part in the dismissal of Yousef Qablawi, chief executive of the Syrian Petroleum Company, who was replaced by Maher Khalil al-Hassan under Decree No. 190 of 2026. The dismissal followed calls on live television by MPA Khaled al-Khalaf for the President to remove him, and demands by MPA Mohammed Balas for officials to be held to account, after a crisis over adulterated petrol and a remark by Qablawi describing his critics as a "herd". Akoush added that the Assembly's influence remained advisory, since the final decision lay with the President under the Constitutional Declaration, and that parliamentary pressure was pushing for the appointment of a prime minister to improve coordination among ministers.

=== Other positions and activities ===
- On 27 October, the Assembly condemned air strikes carried out by the Royal Jordanian Air Force the previous day on sites in the Daraa countryside, which killed seven civilians, including three children, and called for a joint Syrian–Jordanian investigation. Al-Hawshan described the targeting of civilians as a "war crime", while al-Nahhas called on the Jordanian government to investigate, apologise and pay compensation.
- On the same day, a delegation of members led by Deputy Speaker al-Mousa visited Suwayda Governorate and met its governor, Mustafa al-Bakour; the delegation affirmed that the governorate was an integral part of Syrian territory.
- On 3 November, Speaker al-Awak received a delegation from the Inter-Parliamentary Union led by its secretary-general, Anda Filip, who welcomed the restoration of parliamentary relations between the two sides.
- MPA Abdul Mawla al-Hariri returned to the Assembly a painting showing the representatives of the first founding congress of the Syrian state, the Syrian National Congress, under King Faisal, which had been stolen from the Assembly building on 8 December 2024.

== Legislative agenda ==
On 10 September 2026, Asharq Al-Awsat reported on efforts by Assembly members and observers to speed up the legislative process and end what was described as "institutional chaos" stemming from the accumulation and overlap of the former regime's laws and legal norms. Members identified three main priorities for this phase: transitional justice and political isolation; redress, through returning to government employment those dismissed from their posts over their opposition to the former regime; and institutional legislation regulating the work of ministries and bodies. Among the urgent laws listed were draft legislation on weapons possession and combating crime, local administration and its subordinate councils, and the financial system of administrative units, in addition to legislation concerning the ministries of justice and civil service, information and press unions, agriculture and land expropriation, and sports and youth.

Finance Minister Mohammed Yisr Barnieh stated, on 8 August 2026, that his ministry had prepared, on the presidency's instructions, a comprehensive package of 39 financial draft laws, in addition to the draft law on the state's general budget for the 2027 fiscal year, covering the basic financial system, the new tax system and service fees, expressing hope that they would be discussed and adopted in the People's Assembly in the coming months; a joint meeting was held between the minister, the Speaker, the first deputy speaker and the secretary on 6 August 2026 to discuss the Assembly's own financial system and preparations for its budget bill.

Justice Minister Mazhar al-Wais announced that a comprehensive draft law to confront domestic violence was ready and awaiting submission to the People's Assembly, comprising a full protection and prevention system, the creation of specialised police and judicial mechanisms for such cases, strengthened victim-protection procedures, and tougher penalties for perpetrators of domestic violence, calling it "an advanced step in developing the national legislative system to protect the family and strengthen social peace."

Speaker al-Awak said the transitional justice law, prepared by the National Commission for Transitional Justice, would be among the Assembly's priorities as soon as it reached it, and that it must address redress, accountability and corruption files in a manner consistent with the particularity of the Syrian case. Debate arose over the scope of transitional justice, since Decree No. 20 of 2025, which created the National Commission for Transitional Justice, confines its mandate to crimes and violations committed by the former regime between 1970 and 8 December 2024, raising questions about the fate of other files such as the crimes of the Islamic State, the missing and mass graves in Raqqa, and violations attributed to the period of Syrian Democratic Forces control. Lawyer and rights activist Menhel al-Ulw argued that the current legal framework does not prevent expanding the commission's mandate to cover these files, but that this would require either an explicit amendment to Decree No. 20, or including such an expansion in the forthcoming transitional justice law. It is worth noting that violations attributed to opposition factions were not mentioned among the transitional justice issues.

The "Syrian National Democratic Alliance," a bloc of 32 secular and liberal parties, currents and independent figures founded in November 2025, called for shortening the Assembly's term to one year instead of two and a half, and for giving priority to issuing a parties law, arguing that Syria cannot live without party and political life. The Alliance's leader, Mahmoud Marei, said the calls that emerged with the convening of the first sitting to steer clear of parties and blocs were confined to inside parliament, not outside it, and named the priorities of the phase as the transitional justice law, a parties law, a permanent constitution in place of the Constitutional Declaration, and a law regulating the judicial authority, in addition to calling for a comprehensive national dialogue conference. Researcher Samir al-Abdullah argued that the absence of parties from the Assembly in its current form did not amount to an indicator of the absence of political pluralism, given its temporary transitional character following more than five decades of one-party rule and 14 years of war, calling for speeding up the issuance of a modern parties law that would open the field to political activity; analyst Darwish Khalifa, for his part, argued that the absence of parties opened the door to political disputes moving into the street, suggesting the name "People's Assembly" itself be reconsidered given its association with the former regime's era, and replaced with a name such as "Assembly of Representatives," "Chamber of Deputies," or "Parliament."

Speaker al-Awak affirmed that preparing a draft permanent constitution is not among the People's Assembly's powers, since the Constitutional Declaration issued in March 2025 did not grant it this task, and that the Assembly would likewise not work on drafting an elections law or a law establishing parties, confining itself to drafting the laws needed by ministries and bodies to facilitate their work. This raised questions about which body would undertake, during the five-year transitional period, the drafting of the permanent constitution and the presidential, parliamentary and municipal election laws and the parties law, given that the People's Assembly itself was excluded from these tasks.

In November 2026, members differed over when a parties law should be issued:

- Hassan Daghim argued that the law was not a priority in current circumstances compared with transitional justice legislation, warning of attempts by former intelligence officers to present themselves as leaders of new parties;
- Kinan al-Nahhas replied that "political isolation" was enough to prevent the return of former regime figures, and that political life could not mature without opening the way to parties;
- Mahmoud Mustafa, chair of the Social Affairs Committee, proposed a gradual political opening within a set timeframe, and said a political isolation bill was still under study;
- MPA Fasla Youssef, representing Al-Hasakah, called for the law to be issued without delay; and
- Nawar Najma called for "moderation and gradualism", warning that new parties could become a mirror of sectarian and regional affiliations, and of an inflow of what he called "dirty money" to fund them.

On 4 November 2026, Social Affairs and Labour Minister Hind Kabawat said at a seminar at the United Nations in Geneva that a proposal to grant Syrian nationality to the children of Syrian women married to non-Syrians had reached "the approval stage". The proposal requires the marriage to be officially registered and the mother to be Syrian by origin rather than by naturalisation, and the applicant to have no criminal record. Under Nationality Law No. 276 of 1969, nationality passes mainly through the father. Several Assembly members, however, denied that any bill on the matter had reached the Assembly, among them Social Affairs Committee chair Mahmoud Mustafa, MPA Nour Arabo and Nawar Najma. Arabo said the proposal was still being studied by the ministries of interior, foreign affairs and social affairs and by the Council of State, and set out the path of a bill through the Assembly: it is first referred to the Constitutional Affairs Committee to determine whether it may be considered, then distributed to members 72 hours before the sitting, then studied by the competent committee within 15 days (which may be extended), and finally reviewed by the Legislative Affairs Committee for drafting before being debated and voted on article by article. Najma said nationality laws required careful study, warning against putting the Assembly under pressure from public opinion before members had seen the bill's content.

By mid-October 2026, about three months after the first sitting on 12 July, the only law the Assembly had adopted was the one repealing the Counter-Terrorism Court, which drew criticism of the pace of legislative work. Nawar Najma attributed this to the preceding extraordinary session having been devoted chiefly to completing the rules of procedure and then forming committees, describing it as a founding period of deliberation rather than delay. Arif al-Shaal acknowledged the slowness but said the legislative process is bureaucratic, since a draft goes to the competent committee, which studies it and meets the ministry concerned before article-by-article debate, and estimated that the Assembly would not pass more than 50 or 60 laws a year; he said about 30 bills were reportedly before the committees. He added that the Supreme Constitutional Court, appointed by Decree No. 149 of 2026 on 8 July pending a law on the court, had completed a draft of that law and sent it to the Presidency's General Secretariat weeks earlier, and that the court would act only if the President challenged a law's constitutionality, which had not yet happened.

Deputy Speaker Mustafa al-Mousa said that the Assembly's next sitting would be held on 18 October 2026, with bills to be discussed as they arrived. Asharq Al-Awsat reported that this sitting was expected to be devoted largely to voting on a package of bills and decrees, led by a civil service bill and mechanisms for returning to their posts employees dismissed for siding with the revolution and defectors, and including amendments to Article 364 bis of the Penal Code, issued by Legislative Decree No. 148 of 1949, which imposes imprisonment or a fine of at least a year's salary and allowances on public-sector employees who leave their posts before their resignation is accepted, and proposals to repeal certain laws issued since the revolution on recruitment and job vacancies; it also said that some members had circulated working papers on reviewing Law No. 41 of 2004, concerning areas of geographic and border specificity. MPA Rifaa Ikrima said the Assembly's legislative role would begin at that sitting, after an extraordinary session that had seen the election of the bureau, the adoption of the rules of procedure, the formation of committees, the repeal of the Counter-Terrorism Court law and two ministerial hearings, and that the agenda had not yet been distributed to members.

Radif Mustafa, director of the accountability department at the National Commission for Transitional Justice, said in September 2026 that the draft transitional justice law would soon be sent to the Presidency's General Secretariat for referral to the Assembly, and that the commission's chairman, Abdul Basit Abdul Latif, had met members of the Assembly to discuss its main provisions, which include articles not found in existing Syrian legislation. In October, Asharq Al-Awsat reported that the commission's chairman had denied that the draft had reached its final form or been sent to the Presidency, saying it was still under consultation with bodies including the ministries of interior and justice and the missing persons commission. Rights groups and legal experts criticised earlier drafts for the generality of provisions on institutional reform and truth-seeking, for confining accountability to the period from 1970 to 2024, for doubts over the independence of the competent judicial bodies, and for overlapping provisions on political isolation; Mu'tasim al-Kilani, described by the newspaper as a researcher in international criminal law, said that Articles 17 to 20 of the draft provide for a three-member fact-finding committee to vet security or administrative bodies, with no right of appeal or review for dismissed employees, and that Articles 21 and 22, on political isolation, give the committee wide powers and the ability to impose penalties without a judicial basis. On 10 November 2026, the Assembly's Transitional Justice and Civil Peace Committee, chaired by Osama al-Assaf, began discussing the articles of the transitional justice bill and its explanatory memorandum before its formal referral to the Assembly; committee member Hisham al-Afiouni said the aim was to prepare in advance so that the bill could be studied quickly once it arrived.

The Budget and Accounts Committee, chaired by Amin al-Bashir, met the Finance Ministry's director of the general budget, Rania Taghlibi, to review the 2025, 2026 and 2027 budgets, including the exceptional circumstances in which the 2025 budget was prepared, the legal status of the 2026 budget and the procedures for the Assembly's ratification of it, and preparations for debating the 2027 budget; the ministry was working on a twelfths basis. Finance Minister Barnieh said that the 2027 budget had not yet been completed and that its deficit was expected to be below the current year's US$1.8 billion. Imad al-Ashrafani, chair of the Local Administration and Administrative Development Committee, said that a bill amending the expropriation law, being prepared by the Ministry of Public Works and Housing, was expected to reach the Assembly soon, calling expropriation, especially legacy cases more than 60 years old, a very thorny file; the committee also discussed youth housing, drew up a timetable for coordination with the ministries of Public Works and Housing and of Local Administration and Environment, and reviewed neighbouring countries' local-administration laws. According to Al Bawaba, a new traffic law that the Transport Ministry had completed more than 95% of was due to be sent to the Assembly; it would set fines of up to 60,000 lira for major offences and prison terms for offences such as running a red light or exceeding the speed limit by more than 40 km/h, with the aim of cutting road deaths by at least 10% in 2027.

Second Deputy Speaker Madonna Bishara told Anadolu Agency that rebuilding trust between citizens and institutions was one of the Assembly's main challenges, requiring transparent decision-making and clear mechanisms of accountability, and that she wished to explore a legal framework for reconstruction promoting transparent projects, sustainable building materials and clear quality and safety standards while encouraging investment and protecting public resources; she estimated that reconstruction would take three to four years, and named education, employment, economic recovery, reconstruction and the protection of families affected by the conflict among the areas needing legislation.

== Minority representation ==
=== Women representation ===
The representation of women in the Assembly drew many criticisms, as it includes only 22 women, seven of whom arrived through the electoral bodies. Civil activist Ghalia al-Rahal said that presidential appointment might correct the immediate imbalance in representation, but could not substitute for women's right to stand for election and reach parliament by the will of voters, since an appointed woman remains "tied to the authority that appointed her"; she identified the main obstacles to Syrian women's political participation as a patriarchal culture that views politics as a male domain, weak parties and political life, the absence of direct elections, limited financial resources, continued political violence, the burdens of poverty, displacement and family care, and the marginalisation of independent women's organisations with genuine community experience. She noted that the transitional Constitutional Declaration acknowledged women's role but did not set a binding, clear guarantee for their representation, and that unless the permanent constitution and the elections law include a quota of no less than 30%, this representation — currently around 10%, against a Middle East and North Africa regional average of about 16.7% and a global average of about 27.5% — might continue to decline.

Judge Iman Shahoud argued that the new Assembly's diversity must not be confined to "numbers" and "appearance," but must produce meaningful policy; she described the arrival of 22 women members as "a positive step but not enough," stressing that what matters is women's ability to influence legislation and oversight through competence and independence rather than symbolic representation, and proposing transparent criteria for selecting candidates, expanding women's participation in the electoral bodies, and investing in training women leaders. Academic Najwa Bahjat Qassab, who was appointed to the Assembly, considered the transitional, foundational phase exceptional after sixty years in which "parliament lacked weight and purpose," calling on women to move beyond a narrow focus on women's issues and to engage across the Assembly's various committees, and viewing the appointment of a woman to the Assembly's bureau as a positive sign of the growing momentum for women's representation.

MPA Fatima al-Yousef, who lost 25 members of her family in the Khan Shaykhun chemical massacre of 2017, said "the era of symbolism is over," and that she did not believe in symbolic roles, adding: "My role is not to sit and applaud, but to turn the pain I lived through as one of the survivors of the chemical massacre into laws that protect people and prevent such a tragedy from happening again." She identified her legislative priorities as a comprehensive law protecting women from domestic violence and discrimination, labour legislation guaranteeing equal pay and maternity protection, representing victims of violence in documenting crimes, compensation and reconstruction, and educational and reproductive-health legislation to bring back girls who dropped out of school and combat child marriage. MPA Huda al-Atassi, of Homs Governorate, said the current phase was an important opportunity to prove that women are essential partners in legislation, oversight and policymaking rather than merely representatives of a social segment, and that the currently limited representation of women doubles the responsibility on women MPs.

Madonna Bishara, a civil-engineering academic from Latakia University who was appointed to the Assembly in July and then elected Second Deputy Speaker, told Anadolu Agency that she hoped her election would open the way for wider participation by women in political life and decision-making, that women's participation should go beyond numerical representation to legislative work and parliamentary committees, and that she was particularly interested in reviewing legislation supporting women's economic participation and protecting their rights; the agency described her as one of 15 women appointed by the presidency and as a member of Syria's Christian minority.

=== Kurdish representation ===
The People's Assembly has 12 Kurdish members out of 210 (about 5.7% of its seats), three of them within the third appointed by the President. Kurdish parties and factions describe this proportion as weak and not reflective of the Kurds' true demographic weight in Syria. MPA Radwan Sido, representing Al-Hasakah Governorate and also a member of the legal office of the Kurdish National Council in Syria, said he did not believe Kurds would be able to achieve any demand or right through the voting mechanism "given how few of us there are in parliament," and that they needed to reach understandings with the rest of the Assembly's members and the government to secure Kurdish rights and redress the injustice against them, drawing on Presidential Decree No. 13 of 2026, affirming that they would make every effort to entrench Kurdish rights within the permanent constitution.

On 30 July 2026, MPA Fasla Youssef, representing Al-Hasakah, delivered a speech in Kurdish during the sitting debating the rules of procedure, after taking the collective oath had prevented her from swearing it in Kurdish as she had intended; she later said she had noticed there was room to speak in Kurdish, "so I delivered my speech in it," thanking the committee tasked with preparing the rules of procedure, the Assembly's leadership and her fellow MPs, a step that was met with warm applause and welcome inside the chamber.

MPA Alwan al-Ali, representing Al-Hasakah, spoke of a joint working room bringing together Kurdish members and representatives of the Christian community for coordination and consultation, including on voting in the election of the Assembly's leadership and debating the articles of the rules of procedure, and described relations between Arab and Kurdish MPs as distinguished despite the legacy of years of estrangement; he linked the file of Kurdish rights to Legislative Decree No. 13, issued on 16 January 2026, which considered the Kurds an integral part of the Syrian people, and to the gradual progress of integrating state institutions in Al-Hasakah Governorate. Syria's ambassador to the United Nations, Ibrahim al-Olabi, said that the People's Assembly, once fully formed, was the body that would decide, through its committees, on including Kurdish rights within the forthcoming constitution, not the government.

In October 2026, Kurdish members called for the repeal of Law No. 41 of 2004 on property in border areas, which Radwan Sido said had deprived some Kurds in the Jazira, Ayn al-Arab and Afrin of the ability to register their property (see above). Education Committee member Ahmad Murad announced understandings under which "Rojava University" would be temporarily attached to Al-Furat University and "Kobani University" to the University of Aleppo, under the names "Qamishli Colleges Complex" and "Kobani Colleges Complex", pending the establishment of a university in Al-Hasakah; he said a draft for creating that university was ready and awaiting a political decision and the Assembly's approval. On the teaching of Kurdish, Education Committee chair Waddah Rajab said Arabic would remain the sole official language, and that the languages of other communities could be taught as optional subjects under academic rules once the necessary resources and qualified staff were available.

== Assessments and criticism ==
Researcher Ibrahim al-Assil, in an analytical article for Foreign Policy magazine, argued that the People's Assembly is "a weak parliament by design," closely tied to the presidency and with relatively narrow representation, noting that its members — elected through indirect electoral bodies whose overseers the presidency appointed, and a third of them appointed directly by the President — had for the most part not run a genuine election campaign, and that none of them had previously served in an actual legislative body; he observed that the word "oversight" was practically never mentioned throughout the opening sitting, which was dominated by a focus on reconstruction and legislation rather than holding the government accountable.

In an opinion piece for the Lebanese newspaper An-Nahar, writer Ali al-Abdullah asked whether the arrangements accompanying the formation of the Assembly and its committees were aimed at "building institutions for a state of institutions, or building institutions to institutionalise influence," arguing that the Assembly suffers from a "birth defect" given the composite formula by which it was formed — two-thirds through electoral bodies formed by a higher committee the President appointed, and a third appointed directly by him — which, in his account, made it subordinate to the very executive authority it is supposed to oversee. He linked the election of Abdul Hamid al-Awak as Speaker of the Assembly, who had previously chaired the legal committee that drafted the Constitutional Declaration, to al-Awak's subsequent statement that drafting a permanent constitution and holding the presidency and government accountable were not among the Assembly's powers, viewing this as an embodiment of the executive authority's control over the legislative track; he also pointed to the naming of the "Diplomatic and Consular Affairs Committee" instead of the customary "Foreign Affairs Committee," describing it as a "legal pretext" for keeping foreign policy off the Assembly's agenda.

The Lebanese newspaper Al-Akhbar reached a similar conclusion, arguing that excluding the foreign-affairs file from legislative oversight revealed a concentration of power in the hands of the presidency, the foreign ministry and the security services. Officials and MPs, for their part, defended the Assembly's design as suited to the particular nature of the transitional phase; researcher Samir al-Abdullah argued that the absence of parties from a temporary legislative body formed after more than five decades of one-party rule did not necessarily mean the absence of political pluralism, but rather reflected its time-limited transitional nature.

Presidential decrees on economic matters also prompted discussion of the Assembly's role. After President al-Sharaa issued Decree No. 188 of 2026, which amended parts of the customs tariff schedule adopted by Decree No. 110 of 2026 and cut duties by up to 91% on some electrical, renewable-energy and medical equipment, economic researcher Mohammed Alabi asked what the Assembly's function was if basic economic decisions were taken without being referred to it for debate and oversight; the report noted that whether the amendment had to be referred depended on the legal texts governing decree powers, and that the decree's issuance alone did not establish a violation.

In a statement to the United Nations Security Council, the European Union described the formation of Syria's parliament as a new step in the political transition, listed the adoption of a new constitution and contributing to substantive reforms among its principal tasks, and offered to support its capacity-building and good governance.
