= SKYNET (surveillance program) =

U.S. National Security Agency Surveillance Program

SKYNET is a program by the U.S. National Security Agency that performs machine learning analysis on communications data to extract information about possible terror suspects. The tool is used to identify targets, such as al-Qaeda couriers, who move between GSM cellular networks. Specifically, mobile usage patterns such as swapping SIM cards within phones that have the same ESN, MEID or IMEI number are deemed indicative of covert activities. Like many other security programs, SKYNET uses graphs that consist of a set of nodes and edges to visually represent social networks. The tool also uses classification techniques like random forest analysis. Because the data set includes a very large proportion of true negatives and a small training set, there is a risk of overfitting. Bruce Schneier argues that a false positive rate of 0.008% would be low for commercial applications where "if Google makes a mistake, people see an ad for a car they don't want to buy" but "if the government makes a mistake, they kill innocents."

It has partnerships with TMAC/FASTSCOPE, MIT Lincoln labs and Harvard.

== Controversy ==
The SKYNET project was linked with drone systems, thus creating the potential for false-positives to lead to deaths.

According to NSA, the SKYNET project is able to accurately reconstruct crucial information about the suspects including their social relationships, habits, and patterns of movements through graph-based visualization of GSM data. However, scholars criticize that current security literature conflate statistical discrepancies with behavioral abnormalities and that the anomaly detection methodology SKYNET perpetuates the self/other binary. For example, Al-Jazeera's bureau chief in Islamabad, Ahmad Zaidan, was wrongly identified as the most probable member of al-Qaeda and the Muslim Brotherhood on their records.

== See also ==
- Global surveillance
