= Rami al-Saleh =

Syrian politician

- رامي شاهر الصالح

Member of the People's Assembly
- Incumbent
- Assumed office 1 July 2026
- Appointed by: Ahmed al-Sharaa

Personal details
- Born: 1954 (age 71–72) Deir ez-Zor, Syria

Rami al-Saleh (Arabic: رامي شاهر الصالح; born 1954) is a Syrian tribal figure and politician who has served as a member of the People's Assembly since July 2026.

== Biografy ==
al-Saleh was born in Deir ez-Zor in 1954. Following the Syrian Revolution, he became a member of Syrian National Coalition. He is also a member of the Syrian Council of Tribes and Clans. Following the release of the Syrian presidential list, he became a member of the People's Assembly.
