= Saud al-Najras =

Syrian politician

- سعود النجراس

Member of the People's Assembly
- Incumbent
- Assumed office 1 July 2026
- Appointed by: Ahmed al-Sharaa

Personal details
- Born: ? al-Ashara, Syria

Saud al-Najras (Arabic: سعود النجراس; born ?) is a Syrian politician and tribal figure who has served as a member of the People's Assembly since July 2026.

== Biografy ==
Najras was born in the town of al-Ashara in the Deir ez-Zor Governorate. He is the son of People’s Assembly member Sheikh Faisal al-Najras, who objected to Bashar al-Assad’s succession to power during the Assembly session held to vote on his appointment as president.

His brother, Ma’ad, was killed under torture in prison by Ba'athist-led forces in 2015. Following the release of the Syrian presidential list, he became a member of the People's Assembly.
