= Haitham al-Ma'sas =

Syrian politician

- هيثم يوسف المعسعس

Member of the People's Assembly
- Incumbent
- Assumed office 1 July 2026
- Appointed by: Ahmed al-Sharaa

Personal details
- Born: 1992 (age 33–34) Al-Nabek, Syria

Haitham al-Ma'sas (Arabic: هيثم يوسف المعسعس; born 1992) is a Syrian politician and ex rebel fighter who has served as member of the People's Assembly since July 2026.

== Biography ==
He was born in 1992 in the city of Al-Nabek, Damascus Countryside. He is a former Free syrian army rebel fighter who was seriously injured during the Syrian civil war, after which he remained to heal his wounds in Jordan; there, he obtained a PhD in Disability Sciences.

Following the release of the Syrian presidential list, he became a member of the People's Assembly.
