= Muhammad al-Rabat =

Syrian politician

- محمد زياد الرباط

Member of the People's Assembly
- Incumbent
- Assumed office 1 July 2026
- Appointed by: Ahmed al-Sharaa

Personal details
- Born: 1989 (age 36–37) Damascus, Syria

Muhammad al-Rabat (Arabic: محمد زياد الرباط; born 1989) is a Syrian politician, ex-rebel fighter and journalist who has served as member of the People's Assembly since July 2026.

== Biography ==
He is born Damascus in 1989. He is a former fighter of Hay'at Tahrir al-Sham, after the fall of Assad regime he became a journalist and worked at Syrian ministry of Information as Advisor

Following the release of the Syrian presidential list, she became a member of the People's Assembly.
