= Fatima al-Youssef =

Syrian politician

- فاطمة عبد اللطيف اليوسف

Member of the People's Assembly
- Incumbent
- Assumed office 1 July 2026
- Appointed by: Ahmed al-Sharaa

Personal details
- Born: 1991 (age 34–35) Khan Sheikhoun, Syria

Fatima al-Youssef (Arabic: فاطمة عبد اللطيف اليوسف; born 1991) is a Syrian politician who has served as member of the People's Assembly since July 2026.

== Biography ==
Born in Khan Sheikhoun, Idlib Governorate, in 1991. She holds a BA in Arabic Language from the Faculty of Arts at Idlib University. Before the Syrian revolution, I worked as an elementary school teacher. After the Syrian revolution, she lost 25 members of her family in the Khan Shaykhun chemical attack, and she was a survivor of the attack.

Following the release of the Syrian presidential list, she became a member of the People's Assembly.
