= Muhammad Ibrahim al-Zoubi =

Syrian politician

- محمد إبراهيم الزعبي

Member of the People's Assembly
- Incumbent
- Assumed office 1 July 2026
- Appointed by: Ahmed al-Sharaa

Personal details
- Born: 1970 (age 55–56) Izraa, Syria

Muhammad Ibrahim al-Zoubi (Arabic: محمد إبراهيم الزعبي; born 1970) is a Syrian politician and doctor who has served as a member of the People's Assembly since July 2026.

== Biography ==
He is a Syrian doctor from the city of Izraa, Daraa Governorate, born in 1970. He is the Head of the Daraa Doctors Syndicate and Director of Izraa District.

Following the release of the Syrian presidential list, he became a member of the People's Assembly.

== Controversy ==
Al-Zoubi made remarks during a hearing session with Education Minister Mohammad Abdulrahman Tarkou, criticizing the higher proportion of female teachers compared with male teachers. He said the larger presence of women in schools negatively affects students’ personalities and diminishes the authority of schools.
