= Tabqa (People's Assembly electoral district) =

Electoral district of Syria's national legislature

- Electoral district for the People's Assembly
- Location of Tabqa within Syria
- District: Tabqa
- Governorate: Raqqa
- Population: 159,840 (2004)
- Electorate: 50
- Area: 5,464.68 km^{2}

Current Electoral district
- Created: 2025
- Seats: 1 (2025–present)
- MPA: ▌Abdullah al-Haj Abd (Ind.)
- Created from: Raqqa

Tabqa (Arabic: الطبقة) is one of the 60 electoral districts of the People's Assembly, the national legislature of Syria. It is conterminous with the district of Tabqa. The electoral district currently elects one of the 140 elected members of the People's Assembly. Due to being controlled by the DAANES, elections in Tabqa have been postponed and were only held on 17 May 2026. Initially referred to as Al-Thawrah (the former name of the city and district during the Ba'athist period in Syria), the electoral district was later renamed Tabqa when the subcommittee was announced.

== Electoral system ==
The 2025 elections were held under a provisional electoral system, enacted by Presidential Decree 142 on 20 August 2025. The new framework replaces direct elections, with an indirect system. Instead of direct votes, subcommittees will choose delegates that form one electoral college per electoral district, which in turn will choose MPs. The number of members on each governorate's sub-committee matches the number of MPs the governorate will elect.

== Members of the People's Assembly ==
Elections	MPA (Party)
2025	Abdullah al-Haj Abd (Independent)

https://sana.sy/locals/2429727/
