= Mustafa Abdul-Rahman Abdi =

Syrian politician

- مصطفى عبد الرحمن عبدي

Member of the People's Assembly
- Incumbent
- Assumed office 1 July 2026
- Appointed by: Ahmed al-Sharaa

Personal details
- Born: 1960 (age 65–66) Al-Hasakah Governorate, Syria

Mustafa Abdul-Rahman Abdi (Arabic: مصطفى عبد الرحمن عبدي; born 1960) is a Syrian politician who has served as member of the People's Assembly since July 2026.

== Career ==
He was born in the town of Sadan in Al-Hasakah Governorate in 1960. He holds a law degree. After the fall of the Assad regime, he joined the presidential team tasked with following up on the implementation of the agreement between the Syrian government and the Syrian Democratic Forces, and participated in following up on the files of merging the "SDF" institutions into state institutions, handing over government institutions, and handling administrative and legal files in northeastern Syria.

He is a former member of Ahrar al-Sham.

Following the release of the Syrian presidential list, he became a member of the People's Assembly.
