= Samira al-Watar =

Syrian politician

- سميرة الواتر

Member of the People's Assembly
- Incumbent
- Assumed office 1 July 2026
- Appointed by: Ahmed al-Sharaa

Personal details
- Born: ? ?, Syria

Samira al-Watar (Arabic: سميرة الواتر; born ?) is a Syrian politician who has served as a member of the People's Assembly since July 2026.

== Biography ==
al-Watar was a member of the Higher Committee for People's Assembly Elections' legal committee specializing in Private Law. Following the release of the Syrian presidential list, she became a member of the People's Assembly.
