= Hamza Qablan =

Syrian politician

- حمزة قبلان

Member of the People's Assembly
- Incumbent
- Assumed office 1 July 2026
- Appointed by: Ahmed al-Sharaa

Personal details
- Born: Homs, Syria

Hamza Qablan (Arabic: حمزة قبلان) is a Syrian politician who has served as a member of the People's Assembly since July 2026.

== Career ==
Qablan was born in Homs Governorate. Following the fall of the Assad regime, he became Director of Public Relations in Homs Governorate.

Following the release of the Syrian presidential list, he became a member of the People's Assembly.
