= Hussein Assaf =

- حسين عساف - أبو توفيق

Member of the People's Assembly
- Incumbent
- Assumed office 1 July 2026
- Appointed by: Ahmed al-Sharaa

Personal details
- Born: ? Tal Rifaat, Syria
- Party: Independent

Hussein Assaf (Arabic: حسين عساف - أبو توفيق; born ?) is a Syrian politician and veteran who has served as a member of the People's Assembly since July 2026.

== Career ==
Born in the city of Tal Rifaat in Aleppo Governorate. After the Syrian Revolution, he participated in the peaceful revolutionary movement in the northern Aleppo countryside, then joined the armed struggle against Syrian regime forces, and became known by the nicknames "Hajji Tal Rifaat" and "Abu Tawfiq."

In early 2012, he founded the "Heart of the North Battalion," which was among the first Free Syrian Army groups in the northern Aleppo countryside. The battalion merged with the Liwa Ahrar Souriya in March 2012, and the brigade fought its first battles against regime checkpoints and positions in the northern Aleppo countryside. and his groups were subjected to a large-scale military campaign launched by the regime in the region in April 2012.

Assaf subsequently participated in the founding of the Al-Tawhid Brigade on July 18, 2012, and the Tal Rifaat groups under his command took part in the Battle of Al-Furqan during which took control of the eastern neighborhoods of Aleppo. He became a member of the leadership of the "Revolutionary Military Council of Aleppo Governorate," which was founded on September 10, 2012.

He assumed the position of military commander of the Al-Tawhid Brigade shortly before the killing of Abdul Qader Saleh on November 14, 2013. The brigade subsequently participated in numerous battles against regime forces, including the Free Syrian Army's campaigns to expel ISIS from northern Syria in early 2014.

Assaf remained among the faction's leadership as it expanded and formed subsequent alliances, first within the Islamic Front then following the merger of the Tawhid and Ahrar al-Sham factions in Aleppo into the "Islamic Front – Aleppo," and finally within the expanded coalition known as the Levant Front where he served on its Shura Council.

After the rebels lost the city of Tal Rifaat and the YPG, took control of it on April 27, 2016, the displaced rebels and residents of the city settled in camps in the northern Aleppo countryside, and participated in operations by the Turkish-backed Syrian National Army in the northern Aleppo countryside, but they repeatedly called on other factions and Turkey to work toward recapturing their city.

Groups from Tal Rifaat, led by "Abu Tawfiq," later broke away from the Levant Front and he founded and led "Division 50 – Ahrar al-Tawhid" (December 2022) and then "Tajammu' al-Shahba" (February 2023), of which he was the commander-in-chief. The faction engaged in armed conflicts with the Levant Front which accused the group of allying with HTS, which was attempting to penetrate areas controlled by the Syrian National Army.

After Azzam al-Gharib, assumed command of the Levant Front the conflicts between the two factions were resolved, and the formation of the "Unified Force" within the Syrian National Army was announced, comprising an alliance of the "Levant Front" and "Al-Mu'tasim Brigade" and the "Al-Shahba Gathering" in November 2023; however, this formation was short-lived. The "Al-Shahba Gathering" faction then announced its dissolution and its merger with the Levant Front in April 2024.

Under his leadership, the Tal Rifaat groups, as part of the Levant Front participated in the Northwestern Syria offensive (2024), which began on November 27, 2024, and ended with the fall of the Assad regime.

After the fall he was appointed head of the "Veterans' Association" within the Syrian Ministry of Defense in September 2025. He then became a member of the Syrian People's Assembly on the president's list announced on July 1, 2026.
