= Yahya Muhammad Imad Ibrahim =

Syrian politician

- يحيى محمد عماد إبراهيم

Member of the People's Assembly
- Incumbent
- Assumed office 1 July 2026
- Appointed by: Ahmed al-Sharaa

Personal details
- Born: 1976 (age 49–50) Quneitra Governorate, Syria

Yahya Muhammad Imad Ibrahim (Arabic: يحيى محمد عماد إبراهيم; born 1976) is a Syrian politician who has served as a member of the People's Assembly since July 2026.

== Biography ==
Born in Quneitra Governoratein 1976, prior to his appointment as a member of the People's Assembly, he worked at the Damascus Centre for Cardiology and Cardiac Surgery. Following the release of the Syrian presidential list, he became a member of the People's Assembly.
