= Kinan al-Nahhas =

Member of the People's Assembly
- Incumbent
- Assumed office 5 October 2025
- Constituency: Homs

Personal details
- Born: 1974 (age 51–52) Madrid, Spain

Kinan al-Nahhas (born 1974) is a Spanish-Syrian politician who has served as member of the People's Assembly for Homs since 5 October 2025.

== Biography ==
Nahhas is a former member of the Leadership Council of the National Front for Liberation. Nahhas was born in Madrid, Spain, to a conservative family close to the Muslim Brotherhood, and speaks fluent Spanish.

== Political positions ==
Following his election, he outlined several of his priorities for the People's Assembly to tackle: transitional justice, political and civil rights, including a political parties law, judicial reform, education and culture, quality of legislation, and parliamentary scrutiny.
