= Mohammed Dalwan =

Syrian politician

- محمد ياسر دلوان

Member of the People's Assembly
- Incumbent
- Assumed office 1 July 2026
- Appointed by: Ahmed al-Sharaa

Personal details
- Born: Douma, Syria

Mohammed Yasser Dalwan (Arabic: محمد ياسر دلوان) is a Syrian politician and ex-rebel fighter who is currently serving as a member of the People's Assembly since July 2026.

== Biografy ==
Mohammed Dalwan was Born in the city of Douma in the Damascus Countryside Governorate.

Following the Syrian Revolution, he participated in the revolutionary movement in Douma, then joined the “Islam Brigade” when it was formed, which later expanded into the Jaysh al-Islam. He Later became director of their political office.

Following the release of the Syrian presidential list, he became a member of the People's Assembly.
