= Mou'mina Arbo =

Member of Syrian Parliament

- مؤمنة عربو

Member of the People's Assembly
- Incumbent
- Assumed office 5 October 2025
- Constituency: Hama

Personal details
- Born: 1982 (age 43–44) Hama, Syria
- Citizenship: Syria
- Education: Bachelor Degree in Law from University of Aleppo; Bachelor Degree in Political Science and IR from Mardin Artuklu University; Master's Degree from the University of Lancashire

Mou'mina Abdul Ghani Arbo (Arabic: مؤمنة عبد الغني عربو, born 1982), formerly known by her nom de guerre Nour Khatib and also known as Nour Arbo, was selected as a member of the People's Assembly of Syria with the highest number of votes by the local electoral committee in Hama. She is a human rights activist and director of the Documentation Department at the Syrian Network for Human Rights (SNHR).

== Early life and career ==
Born in Hama, Arbo joined the rebellion against the Ba'athist-led regime during the Syrian revolution in 2011, which led to her detention for a year. She then moved to northern Syria, where she worked with the Salvation Government, before moving to Turkey and later the United Kingdom.

Arbo holds a bachelor's degree in law from the University of Aleppo, which she studied in areas controlled by the Syrian Salvation Government. She also holds a bachelor's degree in political sciences and international relations from Mardin Artuklu University in Turkey and a master's degree from the University of Lancashire in the United Kingdom.

During the March 2025 violence in Syria's coastal region, Arbo, using the name Nour al-Khatib, provided preliminary casualty figures on behalf of the SNHR. Alongside this, Arbo spoke publicly about the difficulties of determining the fate of people who remained missing after the fall of the Ba'athist-led regime, citing SNHR's documentation of deaths, executions and missing persons.
