= Wadih Haj Hamoud =

Syrian politician

- وديع محمد حاج حمود

Member of the People's Assembly
- Incumbent
- Assumed office 1 July 2026
- Appointed by: Ahmed al-Sharaa

Personal details
- Born: 1991 (age 34–35) Atareb, Syria

Wadih Haj Hamoud (Arabic: وديع محمد حاج حمود; born 1991) is a Syrian politician and ex rebel fighter who has served as a member of the People's Assembly since July 2026.

== Biography ==
He was born in 1991 in the city of Atareb, Aleppo Governorate. He is a former Free syrian army rebel fighter who was seriously injured during the Syrian civil war.

Following the release of the Syrian presidential list, he became a member of the People's Assembly.
