= Khalil al-Abdullah =

Syrian politician

- خليل دردة العبد الله

Member of the People's Assembly
- Incumbent
- Assumed office 1 July 2026
- Appointed by: Ahmed al-Sharaa

Personal details
- Born: ? ?, Syria

Khalil al-Abdullah (Arabic: خليل دردة العبد الله; born ?) is a Syrian politician who is currently serving as a member of the People's Assembly since July 2026.

== Career ==
He is a member of the Syrian Turkmen Assembly. On 1 July 2026, he was appointed as a People's Assembly by Ahmed al-Sharaa, alongside two other STA members. al-Abdullah is a Turkmen.
