= Mohammed Yasser al-Humaidi al-Hamad =

Syrian politician

- محمد ياسر عبد الكريم الحميدي الحمد

Member of the People's Assembly
- Incumbent
- Assumed office 1 July 2026
- Appointed by: Ahmed al-Sharaa

Personal details
- Born: 1979 (age 46–47) Al Bab, Syria

Mohammed Yasser al-Humaidi al-Hamad (Arabic: محمد ياسر عبد الكريم الحميدي الحمد; born 1979) is a Syrian politician who has served as member of the People's Assembly since July 2026.

== Career ==
Mohammed Yasser was born in the city of Al Bab in Aleppo Governorate in 1979. He has a Master's degree in Sharia and Islamic Studies.

After the formation of the Syrian National Army, he founded the "Al-Mourabitoun Brigade", which announced its joining the Sultan Suleiman Shah Division in January 2020.

Following the release of the Syrian presidential list, he became a member of the People's Assembly.
