= Musab al-Hafel =

Syrian politician

- مصعب الحافل

Member of the People's Assembly
- Incumbent
- Assumed office 1 July 2026
- Appointed by: Ahmed al-Sharaa

Personal details
- Born: Deir ez-Zor, Syria

Musab al-Hafel (Arabic: مصعب الحافل) is a Syrian politician and tribal figure who is currently serving as a member of the People's Assembly since July 2026.

== Biography ==
al-Hafel was born in Deir ez-Zor. He also took part in the Deir ez-Zor clashes in 2023. Following the release of the Syrian presidential list, he became a member of the People's Assembly.
