= Najwa Qassas =

Syrian politician

- نجوى قصاص

Member of the People's Assembly
- Incumbent
- Assumed office 1 July 2026
- Appointed by: Ahmed al-Sharaa

Personal details
- Born: ? Idlib, Syria

Najwa Qassas (Arabic: نجوى قصاص; born ?) is a Syrian politician who has served as a member of the People's Assembly since July 2026.

== Biography ==
Prior, she was the Vice Dean of the Faculty of Arts at Idlib University. Following the release of the Syrian presidential list, she became a member of the People's Assembly.
