= Mohammed al-Tariha =

Syrian politician

- محمد موسى الطريحة

Member of the People's Assembly
- Incumbent
- Assumed office 1 July 2026
- Appointed by: Ahmed al-Sharaa

Personal details
- Born: 1983 (age 42–43) Deir ez-Zor, Syria

Mohammed al-Tariha (Arabic: محمد موسى الطريحة; born 1983) is a Syrian politician who has served as member of the People's Assembly since July 2026.

== Biografy ==
al-Saleh was born in Deir ez-Zor in 1983. He is a former detainee, and has a bachelor's degree in law. Following the release of the Syrian presidential list, he became a member of the People's Assembly.
