= Imad Barq =

Syrian academic and politician (born 1970)

- عماد برق

Member of the People's Assembly
- Incumbent
- Assumed office 1 July 2026
- Appointed by: Ahmed al-Sharaa

Member of the Higher Committee for People’s Assembly Elections
- In office 13 June 2025 – 12 July 2026
- President: Ahmed al-Sharaa
- Preceded by: Body established
- Succeeded by: Body abolished

Minister of Education of the Syrian Interim Government
- In office 17 May 2016 – 10 March 2019
- Prime Minister: Jawad Abu Hatab
- Preceded by: Muhyiddin Bananeh
- Succeeded by: Huda al-Absi

Personal details
- Born: 1970 (age 55–56) Homs, Syria
- Party: Syrian Turkmen Assembly
- Education: Damascus University (PhD)

Imad Barq (Arabic: عماد برق; born 1970) is a Syrian sociologist, academic and politician who has served as a member of the People's Assembly since July 2026. He was a member of the Higher Committee for People's Assembly Elections from 2025 to 2026, and previously served as Minister of Education in the Syrian Interim Government from 2016 to 2019.

== Career ==
Imad Barq was Born in Homs Governorate in 1970.

He received a bachelor’s degree in sociology from Damascus University in 1992, a postgraduate diploma in sociology from Damascus University in 1993, and a master’s degree in sociology (care and rehabilitation of people with disabilities) in 1997, and a Ph.D. in Sociology with a specialization in Social Work in 2001.

Before the Syrian revolution, he was a faculty member at the University of Latakia—Faculty of Arts—Department of Sociology, and a faculty member at the Faculty of Education in Homs.

After the Syrian revolution, he was a member of the Free National Coalition of Dissident Syrian Civil Servants and a member of the Council of Free Syrian Academics. On May 17, 2016, the National Coalition for Syrian Revolutionary and Opposition Forces announced that Jawad Abu Hatab had been elected president of the Syrian Interim Government, and Barq was elected Minister of Education, a position he held until July 30, 2019. He established his ministry’s headquarters in the town of Darat Izza in the western Aleppo countryside.

On December 20, 2020, Abdul Rahman Mustafa, Prime Minister of the Syrian Interim Government (the fifth government), issued a decree establishing the Council of Higher Education, chaired by Barq.

After the fall of the Assad regime, he was appointed, Presidential Decree No. 66 of 2025 dated June 2, 2025, as a member of the Higher Committee for People’s Assembly Elections and then among the 70 nominated by president for the People's Assembly.
