= Suhail al-Fadel =

Syrian politician

- سهيل حبيب الفاضل

Member of the People's Assembly
- Incumbent
- Assumed office 1 July 2026
- Appointed by: Ahmed al-Sharaa

Personal details
- Born: 1958 (age 67–68) Maharda, Syria

Suhail al-Fadel (Arabic: سهيل حبيب الفاضل; born 1958) is a Syrian politician who has served as a member of the People's Assembly since July 2026.

== Early life and career ==
al-Fadel was born in the city of Maharda, Hama Governorate, to a Greek Orthodox family. Following the release of the Syrian presidential list, he became one of the 70 member of the People's Assembly appointed.
