= Sumaya Murad =

Syrian politician

- زهرة جميلة

Member of the People's Assembly
- Incumbent
- Assumed office 1 July 2026
- Appointed by: Ahmed al-Sharaa

Personal details
- Born: 1968 (age 57–58) Arwad Island, Syria

Sumaya Murad (Arabic: زهرة جميلة; born 1968) is a Syrian politician who has served as a member of the People's Assembly since July 2026.

== Biography ==
She was born on Arwad Island in Tartous Governorate in 1968. An engineer, she worked in Tartous. Following the release of the Syrian presidential list, she became a member of the People's Assembly.
