= Hanan al-Balkhi =

Syrian politician (born 1976)

- حنان البلخي

Member of the People's Assembly
- Incumbent
- Assumed office 1 July 2026
- Appointed by: Ahmed al-Sharaa

Personal details
- Born: 1976 (age 49–50) Damascus, Syria
- Occupation: Diplomatic; politician

Hanan al-Balkhi (Arabic: حنان البلخي) is a Syrian diplomat and politician who is currently serving as a member of the People's Assembly since July 2026.

== Early life and career ==
She was born in Damascus in 1976. She studied Arabic at Damascus University, where she earned a bachelor's degree, and she received a master’s degree in Middle Eastern and Postcolonial Studies from the University of Oslo.

After the Syrian revolution, she became a member of the Syrian National Council upon its founding (October 2, 2011), and later served as the representative of the Syrian National Coalition in Norway (June 2013–December 2018).

She has worked in journalism, academia, and media, and has led relief campaigns in several neighboring Arab countries with assistance from Norwegian agencies. She worked as a journalist for Al-Arabiya TV , wrote newspaper articles and participatied in research and political conferences. She was also a member of the Syrian Women’s Association, known as “Nisva.”

After the fall of the Assad regime in Syria, al-Balkhi was appointed as a member of the Higher Committee for People’s Assembly Elections. She has served as a member of the People's Assembly since 1 July 2026 following her appointment by Ahmed al-Sharaa.
