= Ayman al-Shuqairi =

Syrian politician

Member of the People's Assembly
- Incumbent
- Assumed office 1 July 2026
- Appointed by: Ahmed al-Sharaa

Personal details
- Born: 1979 (age 46–47) Sayyidah Zaynab, Syria

Ayman Mohammad al-Shuqairi (Arabic: أيمن محمد الشقيري; born 1979) is a Syrian politician who has served as member of the People's Assembly since 1 July 2026.
