= Yasser Suleiman Mansour =

Syrian politician

- ياسر سليمان منصور

Member of the People's Assembly
- Incumbent
- Assumed office 1 July 2026
- Appointed by: Ahmed al-Sharaa

Personal details
- Born: 1969 (age 56–57) Qamishli, Syria

Yasser Suleiman Mansour (Arabic: ياسر سليمان منصور; born 1969) is a Syrian politician who has served as a member of the People's Assembly since July 2026.

== Career ==
He was born in the city of Qamishli in Al-Hasakah Governorate in 1969, and is known as "Yasser Mansour Al-Hilali". Before the Syrian revolution, he worked as an Arabic language teacher in schools in the city of Qamishli.

Following the release of the Syrian presidential list, he became a member of the People's Assembly.

== Political Positions ==
He wants the University of Rojava to be recognized by the syrian government.
