= Alaa al-Mousa =

Syrian politician

Alaa Al-Mousa
- علاء الموسى

Member of the People's Assembly
- Incumbent
- Assumed office 1 July 2026
- Appointed by: Ahmed al-Sharaa

Personal details
- Born: 1979 (age 46–47) Halfaya, Syria

Alaa Al-Mousa (Arabic: علاء الموسى; born 1979) is a Syrian politician who has served as member of the People's Assembly since July 2026.

== Career ==
Al-Mousa was born in the city of Halfaya in Hama Governorate in 1979. Following the Syrian Revolution, he became president of the Free Hama Provincial Council in early 2016. He resigned from this position later on in the year.

Following the release of the Syrian presidential list, he became a member of the People's Assembly.
