= Muhammad Saeed al-Hasou =

Syrian politician

- محمد سعيد الحسو

Member of the People's Assembly
- Incumbent
- Assumed office 1 July 2026
- Appointed by: Ahmed al-Sharaa

Personal details
- Born: 1965 (age 60–61) Hasakah Governorate, Syria

Muhammad Saeed al-Hasou (Arabic: محمد سعيد الحسو; born 1965) is a Syrian politician and tribal figure who is currently serving as a member of the People's Assembly since July 2026.

== Biography ==
Born in Qamishli, in 1965. He is the Sheikh of the Al-Rashid Al-Ta'i clan in the Qamishli region of Al-Hasakah Governorate. After the Syrian revolution, he supported the revolutionary movement, then left Syria for Turkey, where he resided for several years, and was a representative of the people of the Shaitat region in the Senate in the Eastern Province.

After the fall of the Assad regime, he returned to Hasakah Governorate. Following the release of the Syrian presidential list, he became a member of the People's Assembly.
