= Muhammad Haj Othman =

Syrian politician and businessman

- محمد إبراهيم حاج عثمان

Member of the People's Assembly
- Incumbent
- Assumed office 1 July 2026
- Appointed by: Ahmed al-Sharaa

Personal details
- Born: 1967 (age 58–59) Tadif, Syria

Muhammad Haj Othman (Arabic: محمد إبراهيم حاج عثمان) is a Syrian politician and businessman who has served as member of the People's Assembly since July 2026.

== Biography ==
He was born on 1967 in Tadif, Aleppo Governorate. He had served as the vice president of Aleppo Chamber of Commerce prior to his appointment as a member of the People's Assembly on July 2026.
