= Omar al-Muhammad =

Syrian politician

- عمر فواز المحمد

Member of the People's Assembly
- Incumbent
- Assumed office 1 July 2026
- Appointed by: Ahmed al-Sharaa

Personal details
- Born: 1981 (age 44–45) Khasham, Syria

Omar al-Muhammad (Arabic: عمر فواز المحمد; born 1981) is a Syrian politician and ex rebel fighter who has served as member of the People's Assembly since July 2026.

== Biography ==
He was born in 1981 in the city of Khasham, Deir ez-Zor Governorate. He is a former Ahrar al-Sham rebel fighter with a degree in English Language.

Following the release of the Syrian presidential list, she became a member of the People's Assembly.
