= Issa Muhammad Ibrahim =

Syrian administrator and politician (born 1970)

- عيسى محمد إبراهيم

Member of the People's Assembly
- Incumbent
- Assumed office 12 July 2026
- Appointed by: Ahmed al-Sharaa

Personal details
- Born: 1974 (age 51–52) Qardaha, Syria
- Party: Independent
- Other political affiliations: Arab Socialist Ba'ath (until 2024)

Issa Muhammad Ibrahim (Arabic: عيسى محمد إبراهيم; born 1974) is a Syrian politician who has served as a member of the People's Assembly since July 2026.

== Biography ==
Othman was born in the city of Qardaha, Latakia in 1970 to an Alawite family. He entered public life through the structures of the ruling Arab Socialist Ba'ath Party and became active in local administration in Latakia Governorate.

Following the release of the Syrian presidential list, he became a member of the People's Assembly.
