= Ahmad Nawaf al-Jarba =

Syrian politician

Khaldoun al-Ahmad
- أحمد نواف الجربا

Member of the People's Assembly
- Incumbent
- Assumed office 1 July 2026
- Appointed by: Ahmed al-Sharaa

Personal details
- Born: 1963 (age 62–63) Al-Malikiyah, Syria
- Party: Independent

Khaldoun al-Ahmad (Arabic: أحمد نواف الجربا; born 1963) is a Syrian politician who has served as a member of the People's Assembly since July 2026.

== Biography ==
Al-Ahmad was born in the city of Al-Malikiyah in Al-Hasakah Governorate in 1963. He is a notable member of the Shammar tribe. Following the release of the Syrian presidential list, he became a member of the People's Assembly.
