= Da'wa al-Ahdab =

Syrian politician

- دعوة عبد الحميد الأحدب

Member of the People's Assembly
- Incumbent
- Assumed office 1 July 2026
- Appointed by: Ahmed al-Sharaa

Personal details
- Born: 1966 (age 59–60) Hama, Syria

Da'wa al-Ahdab (Arabic: دعوة عبد الحميد الأحدب; born 1966) is a Syrian politician who has served as a member of the People's Assembly since July 2026.

== Biography ==
al-Ahdab was born in 1966 in Hama Governorate. She is a member of the Board of Trustees of Al-Sham Private University. She has a PhD in psychology.

Following the release of the Syrian presidential list, she became a member of the People's Assembly.
