= Mustafa Akoush =

Syrian politician

- مصطفى يحيى عكوش

Member of the People's Assembly
- Incumbent
- Assumed office 1 July 2026
- Appointed by: Ahmed al-Sharaa

Personal details
- Born: 1986 (age 39–40) Atareb, Syria

Mustafa Akoush (Arabic: مصطفى يحيى عكوش; born 1986) is a Syrian politician and ex-rebel fighter who has served as member of the People's Assembly since July 2026.

== Biography ==
He was born in 1991 in the city of Atareb, Aleppo Governorate. He is a former rebel fighter who was seriously injured during the Syrian civil war. He has a master's degree in economics and worked as the Director at Sham Bank and teacher at Idlib University.

In 2024, he worked as the financial director at the General Monetary Management Corporation of the Syrian Salvation Government in Idlib. Following the release of the Syrian presidential list, he became a member of the People's Assembly.
