= Israa al-Mashhour =

Syrian politician

- إسرائيل الشهيرة

Member of the People's Assembly
- Incumbent
- Assumed office 1 July 2026
- Appointed by: Ahmed al-Sharaa

Personal details
- Born: 1976 (age 49–50) Deir ez-Zor, Syria

Israa al-Mashhour (Arabic: إسرائيل الشهيرة; born 1976) is a Syrian politician who has served as member of the People's Assembly since July 2026.

== Biography ==
Al-Mashhour was born in Deir ez-Zor in 1976. She is an agricultural researcher specializing in soil science and plant nutrition. She previously headed a department at the General Commission for Scientific Agricultural Research.

Following the release of the Syrian presidential list, she became a member of the People's Assembly.
