= Subh al-Badah =

Syrian politician

- صباح البدة

Member of the People's Assembly
- Incumbent
- Assumed office 1 July 2026
- Appointed by: Ahmed al-Sharaa

Personal details
- Born: ? Suwayda, Syria

Subh al-Badah (Arabic: صباح البدة) is a Syrian politician who has served as a member of the People's Assembly since July 2026.

== Biography ==
He is from the al-Maqous neighbourhood in Suwayda, a neighbourhood inhabited mainly by the region's Sunni Bedouin minority.

Following the release of the Syrian presidential list, he was appointed as a member of the People's Assembly.
