= Abdul-Karim Barakat =

Syrian politician

- عبد الكريم بركات

Member of the People's Assembly
- Incumbent
- Assumed office 1 July 2026
- Appointed by: Ahmed al-Sharaa

Deputy-President of the General Shura Council of the Syrian Salvation Government
- Leader: Ahmed al-Sharaa
- Succeeded by: Position abolished

Personal details
- Born: Urum al-Kubra, Syria

Abdul-Karim Barakat (Arabic: عبد الكريم بركات; born ?) is a Syrian politician who has served as a member of the People's Assembly since July 2026.

== Career ==
Born in the town of Urum al-Kubra in Aleppo Governorate. He was among the founders of the “General Shura Council in the Liberated Areas,” the governing body of the Syrian Salvation Government founded by Hayat Tahrir al-Sham in 2017. He later assumed the position of Deputy Chairman of the General Shura Council and Head of the Council’s Public Relations Office.

Following the release of the Syrian presidential list, he became a member of the People's Assembly.
