= Nawar Najma =

Syrian politician

- نوار نجمة

Member of the People's Assembly
- Incumbent
- Assumed office 1 July 2026
- Appointed by: Ahmed al-Sharaa

Personal details
- Born: 1977 (age 48–49) Damascus, Syria

Nawar Najma (Arabic: نوار نجمة; born 1977) is a Syrian politician who has served as a member of the People's Assembly since July 2026.

== Career ==
Najma was born in the city of Damascus to a Christian family. He holds a degree in medicine from the Faculty of Medicine at Damascus University and a specialized degree in diagnostics and radiology from the Faculty of Medicine at the University of Paris.

He is the founder and director of the Al-Najma Foundation for Radiology and Diagnostic Imaging and the Al-Najma Foundation for Magnetic Resonance Imaging in Damascus.

After the fall of the Assad regime in June 2025, Decree No. 66 was issued, appointing him as the Spokesperson for the Committee for the Syrian People’s Assembly Elections.

Following the release of the Syrian presidential list, he became one of the 70 member of the People's Assembly appointed.
