= Khaldoun al-Ahmad =

Syrian politician

- خالدون الأحمد

Member of the People's Assembly
- Incumbent
- Assumed office 1 July 2026
- Appointed by: Ahmed al-Sharaa

Personal details
- Born: 1984 (age 41–42) Hama, Syria

Khaldoun al-Ahmad (Arabic: خالدون الأحمد; born 1984) is a Syrian politician who is currently serving as a member of the People's Assembly since July 2026.

== Biography ==
al-Ahmad was born in Hama in 1984. He is a member of the Syrian Council of Tribes and Clans.

Following the release of the Syrian presidential list, he became a member of the People's Assembly.
