= Mohammed Balas =

Syrian politician

- محمد بلعاس

Member of the People's Assembly
- Incumbent
- Assumed office 1 July 2026
- Appointed by: Ahmed al-Sharaa

Personal details
- Born: 1981 (age 44–45) Idlib, Syria

Mohammed Balas (Arabic: محمد بلعاس; born 1981) is a Syrian politician and journalist who has served as a member of the People's Assembly since July 2026.

== Biography ==
He is a Syrian journalist from Idlib born in 1981. Following the release of the Syrian presidential list, he became a member of the People's Assembly.
