= Mervat Toto =

Syrian politician

- ميرفت توتو

Member of the People's Assembly
- Incumbent
- Assumed office 1 July 2026
- Appointed by: Ahmed al-Sharaa

Personal details
- Born: Mervat Muhammad Subhi Toto; 1981 (age 44–45) Idlib, Ba'athist Syria

Mervat Muhammad Subhi Toto (Arabic: ميرفت محمد صبحي توتو; born 1981) is a Syrian politician who has served as member of the People's Assembly since July 2026.

== Career ==
Toto was born in 1981 in Idlib. She has a degree in trade and economics and was the widow of Abu Omar Saraqib, a well-known jihadist commander killed in a US airstrike in September 2016.

Following the release of the Syrian presidential list, she became a member of the People's Assembly. She is the first veiled female MP to join the Assembly.
