= Hussam al-Din Tatari =

Syrian politician

- حسام الدين ططري

Member of the People's Assembly
- Incumbent
- Assumed office 1 July 2026
- Appointed by: Ahmed al-Sharaa

Chairman of the Syrian-Turkish Business Council
- Incumbent
- Assumed office 3 August 2025
- Deputy: Ahmed Ramadan
- Preceded by: Office established

Personal details
- Party: Independent

Hussam al-Din Tatari (Note: Arabic: حسام الدين ططري) is a Syrian businessman and politician who is currently serving as a member of the People's Assembly, having being appointed by President Ahmed al-Sharaa on 1 July 2026.

== Early life ==
Tatari hails from the city of Aleppo and holds a degree in electronic engineering. In 2013, following the outbreak of the Syrian civil war, he moved to Turkey where he co-founded a textile manufacturing company with his brother in Kahramanmaraş. Governor Vahdettin Özkan awarded Tatari a Certificate of Achievement in 2019 in recognition of his contributions to supporting the Turkish economy, particularly in the province of Kahramanmaraş. During a 2022 meeting with Turkish Minister of Industry and Technology Mustafa Varank, he proposed an industrial investment project involving the construction of a hydrogen production unit.

=== Post-Ba'athist Syria ===
Following the fall of the Assad regime, Tatari returned to Syria. On 3 August 2025, he was appointed Chairman of the Syrian-Turkish Business Council. On 1 July 2026, he was appointed a member of People's Assembly by President Ahmed al-Sharaa.

== See also ==
- Ragheed al-Tatari
