= Asma al-Saba'i =

Syrian politician

- أسماء السباعي

Member of the People's Assembly
- Incumbent
- Assumed office 12 July 2026
- Appointed by: Ahmed al-Sharaa

Personal details
- Born: 1979 (age 46–47) Riyadh, Saudi Arabia

Asma Farhan al-Saba'i (Arabic: أسماء السباعي; born 1979) is a Syrian politician who has served as member of the People's Assembly since July 2026.

== Biography ==
Al-Sibai was born in 1979 in Riyadh, Saudi Arabia and her family originally from Homs. She is a former political detainee of the Assad regime and social activist with a bachelor's degree in Arabic language. Regime forces arrested her and her mother in 2017, and they were released in a prisoner exchange in 2020. While her husband, Anas Farouk Al-Sibai, was killed under torture in the regime's prisons.

Following the release of the Syrian presidential list, she became a member of the People's Assembly.
