= Hammoud al-Hassan al-Hamoud =

Syrian politician

- حمود إبراهيم حسن الحمود

Member of the People's Assembly
- Incumbent
- Assumed office 1 July 2026
- Appointed by: Ahmed al-Sharaa

Personal details
- Born: 1959 (age 66–67) Raqqa, Syria

Hammoud al-Hassan al-Hamoud (Arabic: حمود إبراهيم حسن الحمود; born 1959) is a Syrian politician who is currently serving as a member of the People's Assembly since July 2026.

== Biography ==
al-Hamoud was born in Raqqa in 1959.

Following the release of the Syrian presidential list, he became a member of the People's Assembly.
