= Radwan Sido =

Syrian Kurdish politician

Member of the People's Assembly
- Incumbent
- Assumed office 24 May 2026
- Constituency: Qamishli

Personal details
- Party: Kurdish Equality Party
- Other political affiliations: Kurdish National Council

Radwan Othman Sido (Note: رضوان سيدو) (Note: Alternatively translated as Radwan Saydo) is a Syrian politician who has been a member of the People's Assembly of Syria since 24 May 2026. A member of the Kurdish Equality Party (KEP), he served on the party's political bureau, alongside serving as the head of the legal office within the Kurdish National Council, which KEP is a part of.
