= Abdullah al-Zayed =

Syrian politician

- عبد الله الزايد

Member of the People's Assembly
- Incumbent
- Assumed office 1 July 2026
- Appointed by: Ahmed al-Sharaa

Personal details
- Born: ? Damascus, Syria

Abdullah al-Zayed (Arabic: عبد الله الزايد) is a Syrian politician and businessman who is currently serving as a member of the People's Assembly since July 2026.

== Biography ==
He previously served as the Secretary of the Damascus and Rif Dimashq Chambers of Industry. Following the release of the Syrian presidential list, he was appointed as a member of the People's Assembly.
