= Husam al-Din Razma =

Syrian politician

- حسام الدين محمد ماجد رزمة

Member of the People's Assembly
- Incumbent
- Assumed office 1 July 2026
- Appointed by: Ahmed al-Sharaa

Personal details
- Born: 1979 (age 46–47) Qudsaya, Syria

Husam al-Din Razma (Arabic: حسام الدين محمد ماجد رزمة; born 1979) is a Syrian politician who has served as member of the People's Assembly since July 2026.

== Biografy ==
Razma was born in the city of Qudsaya in Damascus Countryside in 1979. He has a PhD in Sharia.

After the Syrian revolution, he supported the peaceful movement in the city of Qudsaya, then left for Turkey and later Libya. After the fall of the Assad regime, he served on the Development Committee in the city of Qudsaya and supported educational and local initiatives, in addition to providing religious lessons in mosques.

Following the release of the Syrian presidential list, he became a member of the People's Assembly.
