= Lara Qadid =

Syrian politician

- لارا قاديد

Member of the People's Assembly
- Incumbent
- Assumed office 1 July 2026
- Appointed by: Ahmed al-Sharaa

Personal details
- Born: ? Aleppo, Syria

Lara Qadid (Arabic: لارا قاديد; born ?) is a Syrian Armenian politician who has served as member of the People's Assembly since July 2026.

== Biografy ==
Lara Qadid serves as President of the Private University of Cordoba.

Following the release of the Syrian presidential list, she became a member of the People's Assembly.
