= Ahmad Zaidan =

Syrian politician

- أحمد عمر زيدان - حجي حريتان

Member of the People's Assembly
- Incumbent
- Assumed office 12 July 2026
- Appointed by: Ahmed al-Sharaa

Personal details
- Born: ? Haritan, Syria

Ahmad Zaidan (Arabic: أحمد عمر زيدان - حجي حريتان; born ?) is a Syrian politician and ex-rebel fighter who is currently serving as a member of the People's Assembly since July 2026.

== Career ==
Ahmad Zaidan was born in the town of Haritan in Aleppo Governorate, where he was known by the nicknames “Abu Omar Zidan” and “Hajji Haritan.”

=== Syrian revolution and civil war ===
After the Syrian revolution and subsequent civil war, he helped found the Zubayr ibn al-Awwam Battalion in April 2012, which joined the Free Men of the North Brigade upon its establishment. Hajji Haritan led the battalion in several battles in the northern Aleppo countryside, most notably the operation to destroy a convoy of tanks in the town of Haritan in June 2012, as well as several operations to repel regime army convoys heading north, until the battalion, accompanied by the Haritan battalions, managed to take control of the town of Haritan on July 20, 2012.

In October 2012, the battalion restructured itself following an increase in its ranks. Several battalions from the town of Haritan joined it, becoming known as the Zubayr ibn al-Awwam Battalions, also known as the Zubayr ibn al-Awwam Brigade, under the command of Hajji Haritan, who led them in the battles at the Lermon Roundabout and the liberation of Handarat on the outskirts of Aleppo. Then, in late 2012, the Zubayr ibn al-Awwam Battalions joined the Al-Tawhid Brigade.

From early 2013, Hajji Haritan served as a leader of the Tawhid Brigade and its head of general security; he later assumed the position of deputy chairman of the Shura Council of the Islamic Front (Syria) following its establishment on November 22, 2013.

As part of the Levant Front, the battalions participated in battles to expel ISIS from the northern Aleppo countryside, as well as in clashes against the regime’s army. They also took part in Turkish military operations conducted in conjunction with the Syrian National Army, namely Operation Euphrates Shield, Operation Olive Branch, and Operation Spring of Peace.

In June 2017, he became commander of the General Security Directorate in Azaz after being promoted to the rank of brigadier general. He was removed from his post on September 5, 2018, following the Directorate’s arrest of a Turkish officer, after which the Turkish army deployed military units to surround the Directorate and subsequently isolate him.

=== Post-Ba'athist Syria ===
Following the release of the Syrian presidential list, he became a member of the People's Assembly.
