= Ahmad al-Afdal =

Syrian politician

- أحمد قدور الأفدال

Member of the People's Assembly
- Incumbent
- Assumed office 1 July 2026
- Appointed by: Ahmed al-Sharaa

Personal details
- Born: ? Raqqa, Syria

Ahmad al-Afdal (Arabic: أحمد قدور الأفدال; born ?) is a Syrian politician who has served as member of the People's Assembly since July 2026.

== Biography ==
al-Afdal is the director of the Raqqa branch of Al-Furat University Following the release of the Syrian presidential list, she became a member of the People's Assembly.
