= Mu'ayyad Habib =

Syrian activist and politician (born 1986)

- مؤيد حبيب

Secretary of the People's Assembly of Syria
- Incumbent
- Assumed office 12 July 2026
- President: Ahmed al-Sharaa
- Speaker: Abdul Hamid al-Awak

Member of the People's Assembly
- Incumbent
- Assumed office 12 July 2026
- Constituency: Darayya

Personal details
- Born: Mu'ayyad Muhammad Habib; 1986 (age 39–40) Darayya, Syria
- Party: Independent
- Other political affiliations: Martyrs of Islam Brigade (2013–2018)
- Education: Mardin Artuklu University (BA)

Mu'ayyad Muhammad Habib (Arabic: مؤيد محمد حبيب; born 1986), formerly known by his nom de guerre Abu Wael, is a Syrian politician, activist and former rebel commander who has served as a member of the People's Assembly, elected in the 2025–26 Syrian parliamentary election, representing Darayya.

Prior, he was a prominent figure in the local revolutionary movement, a founding member of the Darayya Local Council, and deputy commander and later commander of the Martyrs of Islam Brigade from 2016 to 2018.

== Early life ==
Habib was born in the city of Darayya, Rif Dimashq Governorate, in 1986. He initially studied journalism and media at the al-Fath Islamic Institute in Damascus, but interrupted his studies during his second year in 2007 to complete compulsory military service. Habib subsequently worked in accounting for a commercial shopping center for three years and was also involved in beekeeping and the honey trade. As a young activist, he participated in civic initiatives in Darayya, including campaigns to clean the city's streets in 2003.

=== Syrian revolution and civil war ===
Following the outbreak of the Syrian revolution in 2011, Habib became involved in the peaceful protest movement in Darayya. Amidst brutal crackdowns on protestors and subsequent civil war, he would also participate in the establishment of local Free Syrian Army formations in the city, and was among the founders of the Darayya Local Council, established on 17 October 2012.

During the siege of Darayya, which began in late 2012, Habib helped establish the Darayya Martyrs Battalion on 1 September 2012. The group later joined the Martyrs of Islam Brigade, in which he served as deputy commander between 2013 and 2016. In that role he participated in military operations against Syrian government forces and allied militias surrounding the city. He was also a member of the executive office of the Darayya Local Council and played a leading role in negotiations with the Syrian government that culminated in the evacuation agreement of August 2016, under which the remaining fighters and civilians were transferred from the city to northern Syria.

Following his displacement to northern Syria, Habib became commander of the Martyrs of Islam Brigade in September 2016. He later represented the Syrian opposition during the Riyadh II Conference in November 2017. In mid-2018, he withdrew from military activity and moved to Turkey to continue his studies, receiving a bachelor's degree in political science and international relations from Mardin Artuklu University in 2021. While in Turkey, Habib worked in political training and civil society initiatives, serving as executive director of the Moqarebat Center for Political Development and helping establish the organization United Against Racism and Sectarianism in 2021.

Habib participated in the founding of the Free Syria Movement in 2023, serving as its secretary-general until the movement ceased operations following the fall of the Assad regime in December 2024.

=== Post-Ba'athist Syria ===
He participated in the Syrian National Dialogue Conference and subsequently headed the Activists' Office within the Political Affairs Directorate of Rif Dimashq Governorate. He later stood as a candidate for the constituency of Darayya in the 2025 parliamentary election and was elected to the People's Assembly in October 2025.

==== Secretary of the People's Assembly ====
At the inaugural session of the 23rd People's Assembly held on 12 July 2026, Habib was elected as the secretary of the People's Assembly, gaining 87 votes.
