= Abdul Hamid al-Awak =

Speaker of the People's Assembly of Syria since 2026

- عبد الحميد عكيل العواك

Speaker of the People's Assembly of Syria
- Incumbent
- Assumed office 12 July 2026
- President: Ahmed al-Sharaa
- Deputy: Mustafa al-Mousa; Madonna Bishara
- Preceded by: Hammouda Sabbagh^{[a]}

Member of the People's Assembly
- Incumbent
- Assumed office 1 July 2026
- Appointed by: Ahmed al-Sharaa

Personal details
- Born: Abdul Hamid Akil al-Awak; 1966 (age 59–60) Ghuwayran, Hasakah, Syria
- Party: Independent
- Education: University of Aleppo (LL.B.); Islamic University of Lebanon; Beirut Arab University (Ph.D)
- Occupation: Jurist, politician, and academic
- Vacant from 8 December 2024 to 12 July 2026.

Abdul Hamid Akil al-Awak (Note: Arabic: عبد الحميد عكيل العواك, also transliterated as Abdul Hamid Aqil al-Awak) (born c. 1966) is a Syrian politician, jurist, and academic who has served as Speaker of the People's Assembly of Syria since 12 July 2026. He is the first person to hold the position of Speaker since the fall of the Assad regime and is one of the most prominent figures in the country’s post-Assad government. Al-Awak has also served as a member of the People's Assembly since 1 July 2026, following his appointment by President Ahmed al-Sharaa.

== Early life and education ==
Al-Awak was born in Ghuwayran, Hasakah, Syria, in 1966, where he completed his primary and secondary education. He obtained a bachelor's degree in law from the University of Aleppo in 1990, followed by a diploma in public law. He later earned a master's degree in administrative law from the Islamic University in Lebanon in 2009 and a Ph.D in constitutional law from Beirut Arab University. Throughout his academic career, al-Awak wrote several studies and articles on constitutional law, judicial independence, the separation of powers, transitional justice, and decentralization.

== Career ==
Between 1993 and 1998, al-Awak served as Director of Legal Affairs at the Tigris and Khabur Basin Directorate. He later worked as a judge with the rank of consultant at the Syrian Ministry of Justice for ten years between 1998 and 2014. He practiced law in Hasakah Governorate for 16 years.

Al-Awak left Syria in 2014 after being summoned by the Ba'athist regime's State Security apparatus due to his support for the Syrian revolution. Following his departure from Syria, al-Awak became a prominent legal and academic voice within the Syrian opposition. Al-Awak moved to the southeastern Turkish city of Mardin.

He has also worked in academia, serving as an assistant professor at Mardin Artuklu University since 2016 and as a lecturer at the Faculty of Law at Al-Furat University. He was involved in the development of judicial institutions in Turkish-controlled northern Syria and specialized in transitional justice. He also served as a consultant for the Stabilization Support Unit, a Syrian non-governmental and non-profit organization headquartered in Gaziantep, Turkey, with operations in Syria focused on governance, stabilization, peacebuilding, and institutional development.

=== Early public roles ===
Al-Awak was appointed to the Syrian Constitutional Committee as a representative of the Syrian Negotiation Commission; he withdrew from the committee in 2018, citing the lack of meaningful progress in the political process. After returning to Syria following the fall of the Assad regime, al-Awak took charge of the Faculty of Law at the University of Aleppo in a temporary capacity.

In March 2025, President Ahmed al-Sharaa appointed him as a member of the committee responsible for drafting the Constitutional Declaration of the Syrian Arab Republic. In that capacity as a member of the committee, al-Awak oversaw the preparation of the legal principles governing the transitional period, including provisions on public freedoms and the separation of powers. On 13 March, al-Sharaa ratified the constitutional declaration, which would remain in effect for five years.

On 1 July 2026, he was appointed as a member of the People's Assembly by al-Sharaa.

== Speaker of the People's Assembly of Syria ==
=== Nomination ===
On 30 June 2026, The New Arab reported that al-Awak was considered the Speaker of the People's Assembly, although this had yet to be confirmed at the time.

The People’s Assembly’s first session was originally scheduled for 6 July but was delayed until 12 July, when it was held as the first legislature to convene since the fall of the Assad regime. The session was chaired by Osama al-Assaf until the selection process concluded, during which he opened the nomination process for the position of Speaker, and al-Awak, Mouayad Ghazlan al-Qablawi, and Mohammad Ramez Koraj submitted their candidacies.

The members of the People's Assembly elected al-Awak as Speaker of the People's Assembly of Syria on 12 July 2026 during the assembly's inaugural session following the regime change, with 99 votes out of 205 ballots cast in a secret ballot. He defeated Mouayad Ghazlan al-Qablawi, who received 75 votes, and Mohammad Ramez Koraj, who secured 31 votes. One blank ballot was declared invalid, according to Anadolu Agency.

Al-Awak was the first person to hold the position of Speaker of the People's Assembly since the fall of the Assad regime.

=== Tenure ===
In his speech as Speaker, al-Awak called on lawmakers to unite their efforts to strengthen the role of the legislative institution. He said that the Assembly would cooperate with the executive authority, led by the President of Syria. Al-Awak added that Syria was going through a difficult transitional period and that citizens were expecting tangible results from both the legislative and executive branches.

As Speaker, he chaired the first meeting of the Presidential Bureau of the People’s Assembly on 13 June 2026, during which preparations for the upcoming parliamentary session were reviewed, and the process of selecting a committee to draft the Assembly’s internal bylaws and arrangements for organizing future sessions was discussed.

During United Nations Secretary-General António Guterres's visit to Syria on 25 July, al-Awak met with the Secretary-General at Tishreen Palace. On 26 July, the People's Assembly convened for its second session. Al-Awak opened the meeting with a report from the Assembly Bureau on the preparation of the draft rules of procedure, after which lawmakers discussed the draft regulations prepared by a 17-member committee. The committee, which was established by a decision of al-Awak, prepared the initial draft, which underwent a legal review before being submitted to lawmakers for debate and a vote during the session.

== Political positions ==
Al-Awak rejected the idea of building a state based on sectarian or racial quotas. He stated that a quota-based state distributed power among groups, while a state based on citizenship was founded on the principle of equality among all citizens.

=== Constitutional reform ===
Al-Awak stated that adopting a permanent constitution required a stable political environment, elections, an elected constituent parliament, and broad social dialogue. He added that the Constitutional Declaration was not a permanent constitution, but rather a transitional document intended to regulate the functioning of the state during the transitional period. Al-Awak said that the declaration aimed to create a balance between security concerns and rights and freedoms and provided for an absolute separation of powers. He added that the President of Syria would have executive authority during the transitional period but would have only one "exceptional power", which was the right to declare a state of emergency.

He supported the election of a constituent parliament to draft a permanent constitution, which would then be submitted to a public referendum. Al-Awak also stated that disputes over the name of the state, the religion of its president, and the source of legislation were largely symbolic rather than fundamental to the structure of the political system. He said that the primary focus of any permanent constitution should be the protection of rights and freedoms and the prevention of abuses of power.

=== Transitional justice ===
Al-Awak emphasized the need to establish a transitional justice body in the country. He said that after the Constitutional Declaration, a set of laws would be enacted to prosecute criminals and regulate state institutions under the leadership of the Ministry of Justice. He also stressed the need to reform the Ministry of Justice and restore its proper functioning so that it could once again serve citizens after the fall of the Assad regime.
