= Damascus (People's Assembly electoral district) =

Electoral district of Syria's national legislature

- Electoral district for the People's Assembly
- Location of Damascus within Syria
- Governorate: Damascus
- Population: 2,685,000 (2022 est.)
- Electorate: 500

Current Electoral district
- Created: 2025
- Seats: 10
- MPAs: List: ▌Hassan ash-Sheikha (Ind.); ▌Radwan as-Sabinaty (Ind.); ▌Adnan al-Khatib (Ind.); ▌Ammar Sharqatli (Ind.); ▌Muhammad Basil Helm (Ind.); ▌Muhammad Saadi Sukriya (Ind.); ▌Muhammad Fadi al-Halabi (Ind.); ▌Muhammad Wissam Zaghloul (Ind.); ▌Nizar al-Madani (Ind.); ▌Hisham al-Afyouni (Ind.)
- Created from: Damascus

Damascus (Arabic: دمشق) is one of the 60 electoral districts of the People's Assembly, the national legislature of Syria. It is conterminous with the governorate of Damascus. The electoral district currently elects 10 of the 140 elected members of the People's Assembly.

== Electoral system ==
The 2025 elections were held under a provisional electoral system, enacted by Presidential Decree 142 on 20 August 2025. The new framework replaces direct elections, with an indirect system. Instead of direct votes, subcommittees will choose delegates that form one electoral college per electoral district, which in turn will choose MPs. The number of members on each governorate's sub-committee matches the number of MPs the governorate will elect.

== Members of the People's Assembly ==
| Elections | MPA (Party) | MPA (Party) | MPA (Party) | MPA (Party) | MPA (Party) | MPA (Party) | MPA (Party) | MPA (Party) | MPA (Party) | MPA (Party) |
|---|---|---|---|---|---|---|---|---|---|---|
| 2025 | Hassan ash-Sheikha (Ind.) | Radwan as-Sabinaty (Ind.) | Adnan al-Khatib (Ind.) | Ammar Sharqatli (Ind.) | Muhammad Basil Helm (Ind.) | Muhammad Saadi Sukriya (Ind.) | Muhammad Fadi al-Halabi (Ind.) | Muhammad Wissam Zaghloul (Ind.) | Nizar al-Madani (Ind.) | Hisham al-Afyouni (Ind.) |
