= Rif Dimashq and Yabroud (People's Assembly electoral district) =

Electoral district of Syria's national legislature

- Electoral district for the People's Assembly
- Location of Rif Dimashq and Yabroud within Syria
- District: Markaz Rif Dimashq; Yabroud
- Governorate: Rif Dimahq
- Population: 886,174 (2004)
- Electorate: 150
- Area: 1,300.05 km^{2}

Current Electoral district
- Created: 2025
- Seats: 3 (2025–present)
- MPAs: List: ▌Hassan Ataya (Ind.); ▌Muhammad Suleiman Dahla (Ind.); ▌Muhammad Azzam Haidar (Ind.)
- Created from: Rif Dimashq

Rif Dimashq and Yabroud (Arabic: ريف دمشق ويبرود) is one of the 60 electoral districts of the People's Assembly, the national legislature of Syria. It is conterminous with the districts of Rif Dimashq and Yabroud. The electoral district currently elects three of the 140 elected members of the People's Assembly.

== Electoral system ==
The 2025 elections were held under a provisional electoral system, enacted by Presidential Decree 142 on 20 August 2025. The new framework replaces direct elections, with an indirect system. Instead of direct votes, subcommittees will choose delegates that form one electoral college per electoral district, which in turn will choose MPs. The number of members on each governorate's sub-committee matches the number of MPs the governorate will elect.

== Members of the People's Assembly ==
Elections	MPA (Party)	MPA (Party)	MPA (Party)
2025	Hassan Ataya (Independent)	Muhammad Suleiman Dahla (Independent)	Muhammad Azzam Haidar (Independent)
