= Mustafa al-Mousa =

Syrian pharmacist and politician (born 1977)

- مصطفى الموسى

First Deputy Speaker of the People's Assembly of Syria
- Incumbent
- Assumed office 12 July 2026
- President: Ahmed al-Sharaa
- Speaker: Abdul Hamid al-Awak

Member of the People's Assembly
- Incumbent
- Assumed office 12 July 2026
- Constituency: Jisr ash-Shughur

President of the General Shura Council of the Syrian Salvation Government
- In office 24 April 2020 – 10 December 2024
- Leader: Ahmed al-Sharaa
- Preceded by: Bassam al-Sahyouni
- Succeeded by: Position abolished

Head of the Government's Health Committee of the Syrian Salvation Government
- In office 2019 – 24 April 2020
- Leader: Ahmed al-Sharaa
- Prime Minister: Ali Keda; Mohammed al-Bashir
- Preceded by: Office established
- Succeeded by: Unknown

Personal details
- Born: 1977 (age 48–49) Jisr ash-Shughur, Syria
- Party: Independent (since 2025)
- Other political affiliations: Hay'at Tahrir al-Sham (2017–2025)
- Profession: Pharmacist, Politician

Mustafa al-Mousa (Arabic: مصطفى الموسى) is a Syrian politician and pharmacist who has served as the First Deputy Speaker of the People's Assembly of Syria since 12 July 2026, serving alongside Madonna Suhail Bishara. Prior, he served as the President of the General Shura Council in the Syrian Salvation Government from 24 April 2020 until 10 December 2024, alongside serving as the head of its health committee.

== Early life ==
al-Mousa was born sometime in 1977, in Jisr ash-Shughur.

== Career ==
=== President of the General Shura Council ===
On April 24, 2020, al-Mousa was elected to lead the Syrian Salvation Government as the President of the General Shura Council, serving as such until 10 December 2024, two days after the fall of the Assad regime. Following the collapse of the Assad regime, he was also appointed to the preparatory committee for Syrian National Dialogue Conference.

=== Member of the People's Assembly ===
al-Mousa was elected as a member of the People's Assembly in the 2025–26 Syrian parliamentary election, representing Jisr-ash-Shughur.

==== First Deputy Speaker of the People's Assembly ====
On July 12, 2026, during the inaugural session of the 23rd People's Assembly, al-Mousa was elected as one out of two deputy speakers of the People's Assembly, serving alongside Madonna Suhail Bishara.
