= Osama al-Assaf =

Syrian lawyer and politician (born 1953)

- أسامة العساف

Member of the People's Assembly
- Incumbent
- Assumed office 6 October 2025
- Constituency: Abu Kamal

Personal details
- Born: Osama Muhammad Saleh al-Assaf; 1953 (age 72–73) Raqqa, Second Syrian Republic
- Party: Independent

Osama Muhammad Saleh al-Assaf (Note: Arabic: أسامة محمد صالح العساف) (born c. 1953) is a Syrian lawyer and politician who has served as a member of the People’s Assembly for the constituency of Abu Kamal since October 2025, and is its oldest member. He presided over the first inaugural session of the People’s Assembly, the first legislature to convene since the fall of the Assad regime, until the members of the assembly elected Abdul Hamid al-Awak as Speaker.

== Biography ==
Al-Assaf was born in Raqqa in the Second Syrian Republic in 1953. Prior to the Syrian revolution, he was arrested in the 1980s and spent five years in Saydnaya Prison. He participated in the Syrian revolution and served as a member of the Sharia and Human Rights Office of the local council in Abu Kamal after the Syrian Free Army took control of Abu Kamal in November 2012.

His house was bombed by Ba'athist-led forces, resulting in the death of his wife, and he was later displaced after ISIS seized control of Abu Kamal in July 2014. Following the fall of the Assad regime in December 2024, al-Assaf ran in the 2025 parliamentary election as a representative of the Abu Kamal constituency in Deir ez-Zor Governorate, and his victory was announced on 6 October 2025. Al-Assaf holds a degree in law.

=== Member of the People's Assembly ===
The first session of the People's Assembly was held on 12 July 2026, becoming the first legislature to convene since the fall of the Assad regime. Al-Assaf chaired the session until the selection process concluded, during which he opened the nomination process for the position of Speaker and invited the members of the temporary legal committee to supervise the electoral process, oversee the counting of votes, and establish the electoral procedures.
