= Nizar ash-Shayeb =

Syrian politician

Member of the People's Assembly
- Incumbent
- Assumed office October 2025
- Constituency: Rif Dimashq

Personal details
- Born: 1988 (age 37–38) Rif Dimashq, Syria
- Party: Independent

Nizar ash-Shayeb (Arabic: نزار الشايب, born 1988) is a Syrian politician serving as a member of the People's Assembly of Syria for the Damascus Countryside constituency since October 2025.

== Biography ==
Born in Atybah, Rif Dimashq, in 1988. He holds a bachelor’s degree in Administrative Sciences and completed the first year of a master’s program in the same field. He served as Director of Human Resources in Eastern Ghouta, then as Director of Central Resources at Hayat Tahrir al-Sham. He was a member of the Strategic Decision-Making Committee in the Syrian Salvation Government and contributed to developing its general policies.
