= Battle of Darayya (November 2012–February 2013) =

Battle of the Syrian civil war

- Part of Rif Dimashq offensive (November 2012–February 2013) and siege of Darayya and Muadamiyat
Date	15 November 2012 – 14 February 2013 (2 months, 4 weeks and 2 days)
Location	Darayya, Syria
Result	Rebel victory: FSA fighters take control of the city in mid-November 2012; Army captured the northwest edge of the city parallel to the Mezzah military airport; Siege of Darayya and Muadamiyat continues

Belligerents
(Syria) Syrian Arab Republic; Syrian Arab Armed Forces	Free Syrian Army; Ahrar ash-Sham; Jabhat al-Nusra

Commanders and leaders
Bashar al-Assad; Maher al-Assad	Mohamed Zawahiri; Islam Aloush; Abu Ali (executed)

Units involved
Syrian Army; 4th Division; 42nd Armoured Brigade; Republican Guard; 103 Brigade; 104 Brigade; 106 Brigade	Daraya Martyrs battalion Ahfad al-Rasul brigade

Strength
10,000 soldiers 400 tanks	≈8,000 fighters

Casualties and losses
- 1,000+ combatants and civilians killed

The Battle of Darayya (November 2012–February 2013) was fought from the end of 2012 to the beginning of 2013 between the Syrian Army and the Syrian rebels in the Damascus suburb of Darayya.

== Background ==
Darayya is a suburb of Damascus where rebels have attempted to create a stronghold near Damascus center. In August 2012, the Syrian Army defeated the rebel forces and took control of the town. After the failed rebel offensive in late July 2012, the Syrian army started a campaign against rebels in Damascus suburb that led to a massacre in Darayya with an estimated 500 people were found executed, with rebels and government accusing each other of being responsible for the massacre.

== Battle ==
The rebels again took control of the town in November 2012. Since, the city has been cut off, its electricity cut and has witnessed a continuous shelling. Most of the residents fled as soon as the battle started. The rebels were successful at preventing the Syrian Army from entering the town until mid-December when the Army started to intensify their attacks on the city and the nearby city of Moadmiyah.

On 20 December, after 30 days of siege, the newspaper Al Watan, close to the government, reported an army progress into Daraya, where the army penetrated the city and isolated rebels fighters in the city center. Al Watan added that most of the fighters were foreigners.

On the 31 December, the Army launched its biggest attack on the city, with columns of armed vehicles trying to progress into the city. The rebels attempts to hit the presidential palace and Alawites neighbourhood with their homemade rockets were one of the reason for the assault.

On 4 January, an opposition activist reported that the Syrian army was meeting a very strong resistance in Daraya, but that the Syrian soldiers managed to advance into the main street. The army was also firing from their artillery positions located in the Mount Qasioum on the orchards around Daraya.

The Syrian Observatory, a rebel group, told that the army was sending more reinforcement to Daraya, while Al Watan newspaper wrote that the Army won the Daraya battle.

On 5 January, the Syrian Army arrested Mohamed Zawahiri, the brother of the supreme leader of Al Qaida in Daraya. Russian today Arabic correspondent was slightly injured when he fell on his hand while running to avoid being caught in crossfire. His report showed the army in control and patrolling most of the town. Rebels spread into different areas of Darayaa and the army still needed several mopping up operation to declare the area as safe. On the same day, the pro-opposition group the Syrian Observatory for Human Rights reported that 10 people died in the fighting, including 6 rebels.

On 6 January, the Syrian army killed a number of rebels near the Al Qasheia school in Daraya, and named the following rebels Odai al-Ward, Ahed Radwan, Moutez Mansour, Khaled al-khateeb, Omar Madwa, Tareq al-Dabbas, and Muhammed Tabow as being among the dead. Several other rebel groups were killed by the army in the other Damascus suburbs, including 12 who were named by the Army.

On 8 January, the Syrian Observatory for Human Rights stated that the Syrian Army had taken control of parts of Daraya and was sending more soldiers to push for the full conquest of the town.

On 13 January, concording sources, from security officials to rebels groups revealed that the Syrian Army had taken much of Daraya, entering most of the neighbourhoods.

On 19 January, it was reported that the rebels were still in control of parts of Daraya in spite of fierce clashes and heavy shelling by government forces. Rebels also claimed that a MiG pilot in Daraya had defected and used his fighter jet to bombard three Army positions in the area, killing 15 soldiers of the 4th Syrian Army Brigade. Although this was not independently confirmed.

The rebel commander Abu Ali was killed in the shelling of rebels positions.

On 24 January, the government was shelling Daraya from positions on the Qasioun mountain range west of Damascus.

On 14 February, the Syrian Army attempted to push further into Darayya, but rebels were able to repel the offensive.

== Aftermath ==
In early August, state media reportedly showed that al-Assad visited his troops in Darayya, although SOHR was reporting the Syrian army shelling Darayya as recently as late June, and opposition activists report fighting as recently as mid-July. On 30 December 2013, Syrian government helicopter gunship targeted Darayya with three barrel bombs. The barrel bombs landed near Al-Ansari and Al-Mustafa mosques, in the western part of the city, which has been under a tight siege by government forces for over a year. The Syrian town of Darayya, which has been under government siege since 2012, has achieved an agreement that would allow opposition fighters and people to flee.

The evacuation of the town, which is located near Damascus, is set to start on Friday. Vehicles from the Syrian Red Crescent are preparing to enter the town. Residents have been subjected to near-constant bombing as well as food, water, and power shortages.

Only in June did civilians receive their first supplies in four years. It comes as US Secretary of State John Kerry meets with his Russian counterpart Sergei Lavrov in Geneva for discussions on Syria.
