= Rif Dimashq (former People's Assembly electoral district) =

Former electoral district of Syria's national legislature

- Former electoral district for the People's Assembly
- Location of Rif Dimashq within Syria
- Governorate: Rif Dimashq
- Population: 2,836,000 (2011)
- Area: 18,032 km^{2}

Former electoral district
- Created: 1973
- Abolished: 2025
- Seats: List: 19 (1990–2025); 15 (1973–1990)
- Created from: List: Al-Qutayfah; An-Nabek; Al-Zabadani; Douma; Qatana; The Ghoutas
- Replaced by: List: Al-Qutayfah; An-Nabek; At-Tall; Al-Zabadani; Darayya; Douma; Qatana; Rif Dimashq and Yabroud

Rif Dimashq (Arabic: ريف دمشق) was an electoral district used to elect members of the Syrian People's Assembly between 1973 and 2025.

== Electoral system ==
The electoral system used to elect the People's Assembly was introduced in 1973 and remained in use until the assembly's dissolution in 2025. Each governorate formed a single, large electoral district, except for Aleppo Governorate, which was divided into two districts: the city of Aleppo and the rural districts of Aleppo Governorate. Within each district, seats were awarded on a block-vote basis, with the candidates receiving the largest number of votes taking all of the seats allocated to it, and the assembly was composed of representatives of two sectors, "workers and peasants" and "other sectors of the people", with the former guaranteed at least half of its seats nationally. The number of seats, and their distribution among districts, was left to the president of the republic to set by decree rather than being fixed in law; the total was raised from 186 to 195 in 1981 and from 195 to 250 in 1990, after which the distribution among the fifteen electoral districts was not changed.

All Syrian citizens aged 18 and over were entitled to vote, other than those under legal guardianship, those with a mental illness affecting their legal capacity, and those convicted of a felony or a "dishonourable" misdemeanour, while serving members of the armed forces and police were barred from voting and from standing as candidates; candidates were further required to be at least 25 years old and to have held Syrian nationality for at least five years, a period raised to ten under the 2011 and 2014 electoral laws. During the 2011 reform of the electoral law, the replacement of this system was discussed because of its weak representativeness, but the large-district, block-vote system was retained; the reform instead moved the administration of elections from the Ministry of Interior and provincial governors to an independent Supreme Judicial Committee for Elections, a structure carried over into a further law passed in 2014 that consolidated the rules for presidential, parliamentary and local-council elections into a single statute.

Beyond being considered unrepresentative — a majoritarian, large-district system of a kind rejected by most electoral systems worldwide — the system has also been criticised for the unevenness of its distribution of seats between governorates. Based on the number of registered voters at the 2012 election, the average was around 59,000 voters per seat nationally, but the ratio varied considerably: about 37,800 voters per seat in Damascus and 51,500 in Tartus, compared with 71,700 in Al-Hasakah and 69,500 in the rural districts of Aleppo Governorate, with no mechanism beyond a presidential decree governing the size of constituencies or the allocation of seats between them.

== Members ==
Elections	MPA (Party)	MPA (Party)	MPA (Party)	MPA (Party)	MPA (Party)	MPA (Party)	MPA (Party)	MPA (Party)	MPA (Party)	MPA (Party)	MPA (Party)	MPA (Party)	MPA (Party)	MPA (Party)	MPA (Party)	MPA (Party)	MPA (Party)	MPA (Party)	MPA (Party)
1973	Suleiman Musa (N/A)	Diyaa Ali (N/A)	Yasin Rabaa (N/A)	Hammud Diab (N/A)	Abdu al-Shaqi (N/A)	Mahmoud Khattab (N/A)	Aziz Karbouj (N/A)	Muhammad Youssef (N/A)	Ahmad Qablan (N/A)	Muhammad Wafiq Arnous (N/A)	Muhammad al-Masri (N/A)	Bushra Kanafani (N/A)	Ahmad Dibin (N/A)	Abd al-Majid al-Tajjar (N/A)	Muhammad Subhi Taha (N/A)	15 seats			
1977	Muhammad Eid Ajana (N/A)	Diyaa Ali (N/A)	Mustafa al-Arr (N/A)	Muhammad Khair Soufan (N/A)	Omar al-Saqqa (N/A)	Mahmoud Khattab (N/A)	Aziz Karbouj (N/A)	Hassan Houriyeh (N/A)	Ahmad Qablan (N/A)	Muhammad Wafiq Arnous (N/A)	Sobhi Ayoun (N/A)	Salah Darwish (N/A)	Ahmad Dibin (N/A)	Abd al-Majid al-Tajjar (N/A)	Ali Melhem (N/A)	15 seats			
1981	Hassan Beiraqdar (N/A)	Ruiyat Ofouf al-Yassin (N/A)	Okasha al-Qadri (N/A)	Muhammad Shaddad (N/A)	Hilal Rizq (N/A)	Muwaffaq al-Azab (N/A)	Widad Zarqa (N/A)	Yassin al-Shalabi (N/A)	Ahmad Diyab (Ba'ath)	Said Bakkar (N/A)	Karam al-Khoury (N/A)	Salah Darwish (N/A)	Muhammad Nazim Qaddour (N/A)	Mustafa Slakho (N/A)	Youssef Jaidani (N/A)	15 seats			
1986	Hassan Beiraqdar (N/A)	Ruiyat Ofouf al-Yassin (N/A)	Ahmad Qablan (N/A)	Muhammad Shaddad (N/A)	Hilal Rizq (N/A)	Muwaffaq al-Azab (N/A)	Widad Zarqa (N/A)	Yassin al-Shalabi (N/A)	Karam al-Khoury (N/A)	Amin Hayrab (N/A)	Majed Izzo Rahibani (N/A)	Salah Darwish (N/A)	Mustafa Slakho (N/A)	Mustafa Awwad al-Rifai (N/A)	Youssef Jaidani (N/A)	15 seats			
1990	Hamdan Khashini (N/A)	Zakiya Masarra (N/A)	Mahmoud al-Buqaai (N/A)	Muhammad Shaddad (N/A)	Hilal Rizq (N/A)	Zaher Abu Khalif (N/A)	Muhammad Akram Zeidan (N/A)	Hind Hatitani (N/A)	Aziz Karbouj (N/A)	Amin Hayrab (N/A)	Omar Aybour (N/A)	Abd al-Hafiz al-Qalsh (N/A)	Abdo Qasim (N/A)	Mustafa Awwad al-Rifai (N/A)	Youssef Jaidani (N/A)	Ali Qabalan (N/A)	Abd al-Rahman al-Ahmar (N/A)	Muhammad Abd al-Azim (N/A)	Amil al-Anini (N/A)
1994	Hamdan Khashini (N/A)	Omar al-Shalt (N/A)	Hind Jijaan (N/A)	Sabah Awad (N/A)	Hilal Rizq (N/A)	Zaher Abu Khalif (N/A)	Elias Murad (N/A)	Muhammad Diab (N/A)	Mahmoud Diab (N/A)	Ali Khadra (N/A)	Muhammad Khair al-Samal (N/A)	Abd al-Hafiz al-Qalsh (N/A)	Saleh al-Qadri (N/A)	Abd al-Karim al-Khouli (N/A)	Mustafa al-Tajjar (N/A)	Ali Qabalan (N/A)	Abd al-Rahman al-Ahmar (N/A)	Ahmad al-Turk (N/A)	Ali Melhem (N/A)
1998	Ayman Zidan (N/A)	Omar al-Shalt (N/A)	Sameera Kashka (N/A)	Tahir Abu Khalif (N/A)	Irfan al-Baradai (N/A)	Abd al-Latif Hussein (N/A)	Rifat al-Tarshan (N/A)	Samia al-Shaer (N/A)	Mahmoud Diab (N/A)	Abd al-Aziz Maqali (Ind.)	Ahmad Qablan (N/A)	Mamoun al-Qastalani (N/A)	Ali Awad (N/A)	Abd al-Karim al-Khouli (N/A)	Mustafa al-Tajjar (N/A)	Suleiman Moussa (N/A)	Abd al-Rahman al-Ahmar (N/A)	Ahmad al-Turk (N/A)	Othman Jumaa (N/A)
2000 by-election	Ayman Zidan (N/A)	Omar al-Shalt (N/A)	Sameera Kashka (N/A)	Tahir Abu Khalif (N/A)	Irfan al-Baradai (N/A)	Abd al-Latif Hussein (N/A)	Rifat al-Tarshan (N/A)	Samia al-Shaer (N/A)	Mahmoud Diab (N/A)	Abd al-Aziz Maqali (Ind.)	Ahmad Qablan (N/A)	Mamoun al-Qastalani (N/A)	Ali Awad (N/A)	Abd al-Karim al-Khouli (N/A)	Jadallah Qaddour (ASM)	Suleiman Moussa (N/A)	Abd al-Rahman al-Ahmar (N/A)	Ahmad al-Turk (N/A)	Othman Jumaa (N/A)
2003	Salah Taame (Ba'ath)	Ibrahim Shamieh (N/A)	Sameera Kashka (N/A)	Sabah Hammoudeh (N/A)	Mustafa Jabr (N/A)	Izdihar Maatouq (N/A)	Hamza Munther (Ba'ath)	Muhammad Anwar Ubayd (N/A)	Adnan Arabsh (Ba'ath)	Abd al-Aziz Maqali (Ind.)	Nizar al-Assassi (N/A)	Ahmad Ahmad al-Dalati (Ind.)	Ahmad Khalil (Ba'ath)	Maan Barakat (N/A)	Jadallah Qaddour (ASM)	Atif al-Naddaf (Ba'ath)	Abd al-Rahman al-Ahmar (N/A)	Muhammad Omar Buqai (N/A)	Omar al-Hallaq (N/A)
2005 by-election	Salah Taame (Ba'ath)	Ibrahim Shamieh (N/A)	Sameera Kashka (N/A)	Sabah Hammoudeh (N/A)	Mustafa Jabr (N/A)	Izdihar Maatouq (N/A)	Hamza Munther (Ba'ath)	Muhammad Anwar Ubayd (N/A)	Adnan Arabsh (Ba'ath)	Abd al-Aziz Maqali (Ind.)	Nizar al-Assassi (N/A)	Ahmad Ahmad al-Dalati (Ind.)	Imad al-Azab (Ba'ath)	Maan Barakat (N/A)	Jadallah Qaddour (ASM)	Nazih Abboud (Ba'ath)	Mowaffaq al-Habashi (Ind.)	Muhammad Omar Buqai (N/A)	Omar al-Hallaq (N/A)
2007	Salah Taame (Ba'ath)	Ghiyath Ghazzal (Ba'ath)	Ahmad Sarhan (Ba'ath)	Diab Youssef (SUP)	Salah Abla (Ba'ath)	Mustafa al-Sayyid Hamoud (SUP)	Hamza Munther (Ba'ath)	Abdallah Sharha (ASUP)	Adnan Arabsh (Ba'ath)	Abd al-Aziz Maqali (Ind.)	Muhammad Barmou (Ind.)	Thuraya Muslimaniyya (Ba'ath)	Muhammad Osama Burhan (Ba'ath)	Ihsan Ataya (Ba'ath)	Ilham al-Hallaq (Ba'ath)	Nazih Abboud (Ba'ath)	Mowaffaq al-Habashi (Ind.)	Munther Izz al-Din (Ba'ath)	Hussam al-Din Mustafa (Ind.)
2008 by-election	Salah Taame (Ba'ath)	Ghiyath Ghazzal (Ba'ath)	Ahmad Sarhan (Ba'ath)	Diab Youssef (SUP)	Salah Abla (Ba'ath)	Mustafa al-Sayyid Hamoud (SUP)	Hamza Munther (Ba'ath)	Fayez al-Safadi (ASUP)	Adnan Arabsh (Ba'ath)	Abd al-Aziz Maqali (Ind.)	Muhammad Barmou (Ind.)	Thuraya Muslimaniyya (Ba'ath)	Muhammad Osama Burhan (Ba'ath)	Ihsan Ataya (Ba'ath)	Ilham al-Hallaq (Ba'ath)	Nazih Abboud (Ba'ath)	Mowaffaq al-Habashi (Ind.)	Munther Izz al-Din (Ba'ath)	Hussam al-Din Mustafa (Ind.)
2012	George Nakhleh (Ba'ath)	Georgina Rizq (Ba'ath)	Raja al-Na'al (Ba'ath)	Ali al-Sheikh (Ba'ath)	Kamal Aqsimi (Ba'ath)	Muhammad Bakhit (Ba'ath)	Mosab al-Halabi (Ba'ath)	Nabil Darwish (Ba'ath)	Muhammad Khair al-Nader (Ind.)	Mahmoud Diab (Ind.)	Mustafa Hammoud (DSUP)	Abdel Aziz Arida (ADUP)	Khalil Khaled (Ba'ath)	Ziad Sukkari (Ba'ath)	Muhammad al-Saeed (Ba'ath)	Nazih Abboud (Ba'ath)	Muhammad Abdel Nabi (Ba'ath)	Mustafa Laila (Ba'ath)	Khaled Karbouj (Ind.)
2015 by-election	George Nakhleh (Ba'ath)	Georgina Rizq (Ba'ath)	Raja al-Na'al (Ba'ath)	Ali al-Sheikh (Ba'ath)	Kamal Aqsimi (Ba'ath)	Muhammad Bakhit (Ba'ath)	Mosab al-Halabi (Ba'ath)	Nabil Darwish (Ba'ath)	Muhammad Khair al-Nader (Ind.)	Mahmoud Diab (Ind.)	Ahmad Ahmad al-Dalati (Ind.)	Abdel Aziz Arida (ADUP)	Khalil Khaled (Ba'ath)	Ziad Sukkari (Ba'ath)	Muhammad al-Saeed (Ba'ath)	Nazih Abboud (Ba'ath)	Muhammad Abdel Nabi (Ba'ath)	Mustafa Laila (Ba'ath)	Khaled Karbouj (Ind.)
2016	Elias Murad (Ba'ath)	Georgina Rizq (Ba'ath)	Jamal al-Qadri (Ba'ath)	Ali al-Sheikh (Ba'ath)	Jamil al-Jabbaji (Ba'ath)	Shehadeh Abu Hamed (Ba'ath)	Imad Namour (Ba'ath)	Majed Halima (Ba'ath)	Muhammad Khair al-Nader (Ind.)	Mowaffaq Jomaa (Ba'ath)	Ahmad Zaytoun (Ba'ath)	Osama Mustafa (Ba'ath)	Hamzi Shahin (Ba'ath)	Ziad Sukkari (Ba'ath)	Rimon Hilal (Ba'ath)	Muhammad Khair Sarioul (Ba'ath)	Muhammad As'ad (Ind.)	Muhammad Qaband (Ind.)	Muhannad Zaid (Ind.)
2020	Hikmat al-Azab (Ba'ath)	Haifaa Jumaa (Ba'ath)	Jamal al-Qadri (Ba'ath)	Ali al-Sheikh (Ba'ath)	Ali Rashaq (Ba'ath)	Abd al-Rahman al-Khatib (Ba'ath)	Muhammad Kabtooleh (Ba'ath)	Nabil Darwish (Ba'ath)	Muhammad Khair al-Nader (Ind.)	Amer Ubayd (Ba'ath)	Mustafa Layla (Ba'ath)	Osama Mustafa (Ba'ath)	Ahmad Jamil Ibrahim (Ba'ath)	Muhammad Bakhit (Ba'ath)	Rimon Hilal (Ba'ath)	Faisal Jammoul (Ba'ath)	Amer Khayti (Ind.)	Ziad Khallouf (Ind.)	Subhi Abbas (Ind.)
2022 by-election	Hikmat al-Azab (Ba'ath)	Haifaa Jumaa (Ba'ath)	Jamal al-Qadri (Ba'ath)	Ali al-Sheikh (Ba'ath)	Ali Rashaq (Ba'ath)	Abd al-Rahman al-Khatib (Ba'ath)	Muhammad Kabtooleh (Ba'ath)	Nabil Darwish (Ba'ath)	Muhammad Khair al-Nader (Ind.)	Amer Ubayd (Ba'ath)	Mustafa Layla (Ba'ath)	Osama Mustafa (Ba'ath)	Muhammad Qaddour al-Ainiya (Ba'ath)	Muhammad Bakhit (Ba'ath)	Rimon Hilal (Ba'ath)	Faisal Jammoul (Ba'ath)	Amer Khayti (Ind.)	Ziad Khallouf (Ind.)	Subhi Abbas (Ind.)
2024	Hikmat al-Azab (Ba'ath)	Haifaa Jumaa (Ba'ath)	Reema al-Rifai (Ba'ath)	Yousef al-Hassan (Ba'ath)	Fadi Abu Qash (Ba'ath)	Abd al-Rahman al-Khatib (Ba'ath)	Shehadeh Abu Hamed (Ba'ath)	Nabil Darwish (Ba'ath)	Muhammad Khair al-Nader (Ind.)	Faisal al-Raqqad (Ba'ath)	Ali Saadat (Ba'ath)	Osama Mustafa (Ba'ath)	Hassan al-Jabhaji (Ba'ath)	Mujahid Ismail (Ba'ath)	Rimon Hilal (Ba'ath)	Ahmad Hijazi (Ba'ath)	Fahd Is'haq (ASUP)	Ziad Khallouf (Ind.)	Abdul-Latif Daboura (Ind.)
