= Fasla Youssef =

Syrian Kurdish politician

Member of the People's Assembly
- Incumbent
- Assumed office 24 May 2026
- Constituency: Hasakah

Personal details
- Party: Kurdistan Democratic Unity Party
- Other political affiliations: Kurdish National Council

Fasla Youssef (Arabic: فصلة يوسف) is a Syrian Kurdish politician who has served as member of the People's Assembly since 24 May 2026. A member of the Kurdistan Democratic Unity Party (KDUP), she served as the party's secretary. As the KDUP is an affiliate party of the Kurdish National Council (ENKS), she also served as a member of the ENKS party presidency. Rudaw Media Network described Youssef as belonging to the "Kurdistan Unity Party 'Yekiti'" upon her election to the People's Assembly in 2026.
