= Nizar al-Madani =

Syrian politician

Member of the People's Assembly
- Incumbent
- Assumed office October 2025
- Constituency: Damascus

Personal details
- Born: 1981 (age 44–45) Damascus, Syria
- Party: Independent

Nizar Younis al-Madani (born 1981) is a Syrian politician serving as a member of the People's Assembly of Syria for the constituency of Damascus since October 2025.

== Political positions ==
A conservative Islamist, one of al-Madani's policy aims is to ban applause within the People's Assembly.
