= Deir ez-Zor (former People's Assembly electoral district) =

Former electoral district of Syria's national legislature

- Former electoral district for the People's Assembly
- Location of Deir ez-Zor within Syria
- Governorate: Deir ez-Zor
- Population: 1,239,000 (2011)
- Area: 33,060 km^{2}

Former electoral district
- Created: 1973
- Abolished: 2025
- Seats: List: 14 (1994–2025); 11 (1977–1981); 10 (1973–1977)
- Created from: List: Abu Kamal; Deir ez-Zor; Mayadin
- Replaced by: List: Abu Kamal; Deir ez-Zor; Mayadin

Deir ez-Zor (Arabic: دير الزور) was an electoral district used to elect members of the Syrian People's Assembly between 1973 and 2025.

== Electoral system ==
The electoral system used to elect the People's Assembly was introduced in 1973 and remained in use until the assembly's dissolution in 2025. Each governorate formed a single, large electoral district, except for Aleppo Governorate, which was divided into two districts: the city of Aleppo and the rural districts of Aleppo Governorate. Within each district, seats were awarded on a block-vote basis, with the candidates receiving the largest number of votes taking all of the seats allocated to it, and the assembly was composed of representatives of two sectors, "workers and peasants" and "other sectors of the people", with the former guaranteed at least half of its seats nationally. The number of seats, and their distribution among districts, was left to the president of the republic to set by decree rather than being fixed in law; the total was raised from 186 to 195 in 1981 and from 195 to 250 in 1990, after which the distribution among the fifteen electoral districts was not changed.

All Syrian citizens aged 18 and over were entitled to vote, other than those under legal guardianship, those with a mental illness affecting their legal capacity, and those convicted of a felony or a "dishonourable" misdemeanour, while serving members of the armed forces and police were barred from voting and from standing as candidates; candidates were further required to be at least 25 years old and to have held Syrian nationality for at least five years, a period raised to ten under the 2011 and 2014 electoral laws. During the 2011 reform of the electoral law, the replacement of this system was discussed because of its weak representativeness, but the large-district, block-vote system was retained; the reform instead moved the administration of elections from the Ministry of Interior and provincial governors to an independent Supreme Judicial Committee for Elections, a structure carried over into a further law passed in 2014 that consolidated the rules for presidential, parliamentary and local-council elections into a single statute.

Beyond being considered unrepresentative — a majoritarian, large-district system of a kind rejected by most electoral systems worldwide — the system has also been criticised for the unevenness of its distribution of seats between governorates. Based on the number of registered voters at the 2012 election, the average was around 59,000 voters per seat nationally, but the ratio varied considerably: about 37,800 voters per seat in Damascus and 51,500 in Tartus, compared with 71,700 in Al-Hasakah and 69,500 in the rural districts of Aleppo Governorate, with no mechanism beyond a presidential decree governing the size of constituencies or the allocation of seats between them.

== Members ==
Elections	MPA (Party)	MPA (Party)	MPA (Party)	MPA (Party)	MPA (Party)	MPA (Party)	MPA (Party)	MPA (Party)	MPA (Party)	MPA (Party)	MPA (Party)	MPA (Party)	MPA (Party)	MPA (Party)
1973	Abd Allah al-Rawi (N/A)	Hasan al-Umr al-Ali (N/A)	Anam Abdullah al-Hijr (N/A)	Adnan al-Juma (N/A)	Suleiman Uthman al-Akla (N/A)	Rayyis al-Fayyad (N/A)	Qusay al-Sheikh (N/A)	Abd al-Aziz Ayash (N/A)	Fu'ad al-Yasin (N/A)	Sallum al-Abdullah (N/A)	10 seats			
1977	Mohsen al-Mazid (N/A)	Hassan al-Ashish (N/A)	Jarad al-Khalaf (N/A)	Zoubaa al-Akala (N/A)	Faisal al-Najras (N/A)	Rayyis al-Fayyad (N/A)	Suleiman al-Hassan (N/A)	Abboud al-Hafl (N/A)	Shukriya Abd al-Ghani (N/A)	Fawzi al-Qanbar (N/A)	Jumaa al-Abdoun (N/A)	11 seats		
1981	Ghassan al-Abd al-Rajab (N/A)	Nuri al-Sayyah (N/A)	Jarad al-Khalaf (N/A)	Abd al-Qahhar Ubaid (N/A)	Abd al-Karim Abboud (N/A)	Rayyis al-Fayyad (N/A)	Ibtisam al-Taha al-Husseini (N/A)	Abboud al-Hafl (N/A)	Walid Shuaibi (N/A)	Jassem al-Bashir (N/A)	Fayyad Murair (N/A)	11 seats		
1984 by-election	Ghassan al-Abd al-Rajab (N/A)	Nuri al-Sayyah (N/A)	Jarad al-Khalaf (N/A)	Abd al-Qahhar Ubaid (N/A)	Abd al-Karim Abboud (N/A)	Ahmad al-Fayyad (N/A)	Ibtisam al-Taha al-Husseini (N/A)	Abboud al-Hafl (N/A)	Walid Shuaibi (N/A)	Jassem al-Bashir (N/A)	Fayyad Murair (N/A)	11 seats		
1986	Ghassan al-Abd al-Rajab (N/A)	Tariq Safif (N/A)	Jarad al-Khalaf (N/A)	Mujhim al-Muhammad al-Dandil (N/A)	Badi al-Hazzaa al-Ali (N/A)	Ahmad al-Fayyad (N/A)	Ibtisam al-Taha al-Husseini (N/A)	Abboud al-Hafl (N/A)	Abd al-Jabbar al-Mardoud (N/A)	Ammash Jdeia (Ba'ath)	Fayyad Murair (N/A)	11 seats		
1988 by-election	Ghassan al-Abd al-Rajab (N/A)	Tariq Safif (N/A)	Jarad al-Khalaf (N/A)	Mujhim al-Muhammad al-Dandil (N/A)	Badi al-Hazzaa al-Ali (N/A)	Ahmad al-Fayyad (N/A)	Ibtisam al-Taha al-Husseini (N/A)	Khalil al-Hafl (Ind.)	Abd al-Jabbar al-Mardoud (N/A)	Ammash Jdeia (Ba'ath)	Fayyad Murair (N/A)	11 seats		
1990	Ghassan al-Abd al-Rajab (N/A)	Zahra al-Jassem (N/A)	Ahmad al-Hammad (N/A)	Najm al-Abdallah (N/A)	Jassem al-Assad (N/A)	Ahmad al-Fayyad (N/A)	Abd al-Aziz al-Hamada (N/A)	Khalil al-Hafl (Ind.)	Abd al-Jabbar al-Mardoud (N/A)	Nawaf al-Bashir (N/A)	Fayyad Murair (N/A)	Zuhair al-Hamdi (N/A)	Riyad al-Abdallah (N/A)	Hamad Sheikh al-Jilayat (N/A)
1994	Abdallah Safif (N/A)	Zahra al-Jassem (N/A)	Ahmad al-Hammad (N/A)	Abd al-Majid al-Marzouq (N/A)	Naji al-Sheikh Fares (N/A)	Ahmad al-Fayyad (N/A)	Faisal al-Sheikh Fayyad al-Nasser (N/A)	Khalil al-Hafl (Ind.)	Abd al-Jabbar al-Mardoud (N/A)	Fateh al-Zawi (N/A)	Ahmad al-Muhammad (N/A)	Ramzi Muhammad Ghazi (N/A)	Ammash Jdeia (Ba'ath)	Faisal al-Najras (Ind.)
1995 by-election	Daoud al-Shaher (N/A)	Zahra al-Jassem (N/A)	Ahmad al-Hammad (N/A)	Abd al-Majid al-Marzouq (N/A)	Naji al-Sheikh Fares (N/A)	Ahmad al-Fayyad (N/A)	Faisal al-Sheikh Fayyad al-Nasser (N/A)	Khalil al-Hafl (Ind.)	Abd al-Jabbar al-Mardoud (N/A)	Fateh al-Zawi (N/A)	Ahmad al-Muhammad (N/A)	Ramzi Muhammad Ghazi (N/A)	Ammash Jdeia (Ba'ath)	Faisal al-Najras (Ind.)
1998	Adeesh al-Ghadban (N/A)	Zahra al-Jassem (N/A)	Ahmad al-Hammad (N/A)	Abd al-Samad Nouwara (N/A)	Naji al-Sheikh Fares (N/A)	Omar Salibi (N/A)	Ayman Raja al-Muhammad al-Dandal (N/A)	Khalil al-Hafl (Ind.)	Hamad al-Sheikh al-Jalilat (N/A)	Abd al-Razzaq al-Awwad (N/A)	Abboud al-Saleh (Ba'ath)	Ragheb al-Ali al-Soufi (N/A)	Najm al-Din Jawish al-Kharit (N/A)	Faisal al-Najras (Ind.)
2003	Hadiya Abbas (Ba'ath)	Nasser Ubayd al-Nasser (N/A)	Ahmad al-Hammad (N/A)	Ziad Baaj (N/A)	Naji al-Sheikh Fares (N/A)	Saleh al-Bashir (N/A)	Ayman Raja al-Muhammad al-Dandal (N/A)	Khalil al-Hafl (Ind.)	Hamoud al-Hussein (N/A)	Fayyad al-Sheikh (Ba'ath)	Abboud al-Saleh (Ba'ath)	Fouad Battah (N/A)	Abd al-Razzaq al-Awwad (N/A)	Faisal al-Najras (Ind.)
2006 by-election	Hadiya Abbas (Ba'ath)	Nasser Ubayd al-Nasser (N/A)	Ahmad al-Hammad (N/A)	Ziad Baaj (N/A)	Nayef al-Sheikh Fares (N/A)	Saleh al-Bashir (N/A)	Ayman Raja al-Muhammad al-Dandal (N/A)	Khalil al-Hafl (Ind.)	Hamoud al-Hussein (N/A)	Fayyad al-Sheikh (Ba'ath)	Abboud al-Saleh (Ba'ath)	Fouad Battah (N/A)	Abd al-Razzaq al-Awwad (N/A)	Faisal al-Najras (Ind.)
2007	Hamid Sheihan (Ba'ath)	Ahmad al-Muhammad (Ba'ath)	Riad al-Ismail (Ba'ath)	Farha al-Alwan (Ba'ath)	Ramadan al-Khalaf (Ind.)	Faisal Sheikh Fayyad (Ind.)	Najm al-Abdallah (Ind.)	Khalil al-Hafl (Ind.)	Ishaq al-Saleh al-Jassem (Ba'ath)	Fayyad al-Sheikh (Ba'ath)	Ghassan al-Yousef (NCP)	Sobhi Khadr al-Hammadi (SUP)	Muhammad al-Futaih (Ba'ath)	Faisal al-Najras (Ind.)
2008 by-election	Hamid Sheihan (Ba'ath)	Ahmad al-Muhammad (Ba'ath)	Riad al-Ismail (Ba'ath)	Farha al-Alwan (Ba'ath)	Ramadan al-Khalaf (Ind.)	Faisal Sheikh Fayyad (Ind.)	Najm al-Abdallah (Ind.)	Khalil al-Hafl (Ind.)	Ishaq al-Saleh al-Jassem (Ba'ath)	Fayyad al-Sheikh (Ba'ath)	Ghassan al-Yousef (NCP)	Sobhi Khadr al-Hammadi (SUP)	Muhammad al-Futaih (Ba'ath)	Safouk al-Najras (Ind.)
2009 by-election	Hamid Sheihan (Ba'ath)	Ahmad al-Muhammad (Ba'ath)	Riad al-Ismail (Ba'ath)	Farha al-Alwan (Ba'ath)	Ziad al-Khalaf (Ind.)	Faisal Sheikh Fayyad (Ind.)	Najm al-Abdallah (Ind.)	Khalil al-Hafl (Ind.)	Ishaq al-Saleh al-Jassem (Ba'ath)	Fayyad al-Sheikh (Ba'ath)	Ghassan al-Yousef (NCP)	Sobhi Khadr al-Hammadi (SUP)	Muhammad al-Futaih (Ba'ath)	Safouk al-Najras (Ind.)
2010 by-election	Hamid Sheihan (Ba'ath)	Ahmad al-Muhammad (Ba'ath)	Riad al-Ismail (Ba'ath)	Farha al-Alwan (Ba'ath)	Ziad al-Khalaf (Ind.)	Mahna Sheikh Fayyad (Ind.)	Najm al-Abdallah (Ind.)	Khalil al-Hafl (Ind.)	Ishaq al-Saleh al-Jassem (Ba'ath)	Fayyad al-Sheikh (Ba'ath)	Ghassan al-Yousef (NCP)	Sobhi Khadr al-Hammadi (SUP)	Muhammad al-Futaih (Ba'ath)	Safouk al-Najras (Ind.)
2012	Ibtisam al-Dibs (Ba'ath)	Burhan al-Abd al-Wahhab (Ba'ath)	Abd al-Salam al-Dahmoush (Ba'ath)	Maan al-Abboud (Ba'ath)	Jassim al-Badr (Ind.)	Turki al-Zayed al-Mustafa (Ba'ath)	Muhanna Sheikh Fayyad al-Nasser (Ind.)	Najm al-Salman (Ind.)	Riyadh al-Abdullah (Arab Socialist Movement)	Asaad al-Muhammad (Ba'ath)	Bandar al-Daif (Ba'ath)	Dir' al-Dandal (Ba'ath)	Mujhim al-Sahu (Ba'ath)	Riyadh al-Issa (Ind.)
2013 by-election	Ibtisam al-Dibs (Ba'ath)	Burhan al-Abd al-Wahhab (Ba'ath)	Abd al-Salam al-Dahmoush (Ba'ath)	Maan al-Abboud (Ba'ath)	Jassim al-Badr (Ind.)	Jihad al-Shekheir (Ind.)	Muhanna Sheikh Fayyad al-Nasser (Ind.)	Najm al-Salman (Ind.)	Riyadh al-Abdullah (Arab Socialist Movement)	Asaad al-Muhammad (Ba'ath)	Bandar al-Daif (Ba'ath)	Dir' al-Dandal (Ba'ath)	Mujhim al-Sahu (Ba'ath)	Riyadh al-Issa (Ind.)
2014 by-election	Ibtisam al-Dibs (Ba'ath)	Burhan al-Abd al-Wahhab (Ba'ath)	Abd al-Salam al-Dahmoush (Ba'ath)	Maan al-Abboud (Ba'ath)	Jassim al-Badr (Ind.)	Jihad al-Shekheir (Ind.)	Muhanna Sheikh Fayyad al-Nasser (Ind.)	Najm al-Salman (Ind.)	Riyadh al-Abdullah (Arab Socialist Movement)	Asaad al-Muhammad (Ba'ath)	Bandar al-Daif (Ba'ath)	Dir' al-Dandal (Ba'ath)	Sattam al-Dandal (Ba'ath)	Riyadh al-Issa (Ind.)
2016	Muhammad al-Raja (Ba'ath)	Burhan al-Abd al-Wahhab (Ba'ath)	Abd al-Salam al-Dahmoush (Ba'ath)	Maan al-Abboud (Ba'ath)	Muhammad Jadallah (Ba'ath)	Ibrahim al-Daer (Ind.)	Muhammad al-Saad al-Mashali (ASUP)	Najm al-Salman (Ind.)	Taha al-Khalifah (Ba'ath)	Mahmoud Hussein al-Hassan (Ba'ath)	Ibtisam al-Taha al-Husseini (Ind.)	Hadiya Abbas (Ba'ath)	Sattam al-Dandal (Ba'ath)	Hamadi al-Hassani (Ba'ath)
2017 by-election	Muhammad al-Raja (Ba'ath)	Burhan al-Abd al-Wahhab (Ba'ath)	Abd al-Salam al-Dahmoush (Ba'ath)	Maan al-Abboud (Ba'ath)	Muhammad Jadallah (Ba'ath)	Ibrahim al-Daer (Ind.)	Muhammad al-Saad al-Mashali (ASUP)	Najm al-Salman (Ind.)	Taha al-Khalifah (Ba'ath)	Mahmoud Hussein al-Hassan (Ba'ath)	Ibtisam al-Taha al-Husseini (Ind.)	Hadiya Abbas (Ba'ath)	Sattam al-Dandal (Ba'ath)	Aytan al-Aytan (Ba'ath)
2020	Muhammad al-Raja (Ba'ath)	Burhan al-Abd al-Wahhab (Ba'ath)	Ali Adel al-Hajj Khalifah (Ba'ath)	Mahmoud al-Rayyes (Ba'ath)	Bashar al-Mutlaq (Ba'ath)	Mayyada al-Ali (Ba'ath)	Muhanna Sheikh Fayyad al-Nasser (Ind.)	Adnan al-Jum'ah (SUP)	Taha al-Khalifah (Ba'ath)	Abd al-Aziz al-Hussein (Ba'ath)	Maryam al-Mutras (Ba'ath)	Sheikh al-Kharfan (Ba'ath)	Madloul al-Aziz (Ind.)	Aytan al-Aytan (Ba'ath)
2020 by-election	Muhammad al-Raja (Ba'ath)	Burhan al-Abd al-Wahhab (Ba'ath)	Ali Adel al-Hajj Khalifah (Ba'ath)	Mahmoud al-Rayyes (Ba'ath)	Bashar al-Mutlaq (Ba'ath)	Mayyada al-Ali (Ba'ath)	Muhanna Sheikh Fayyad al-Nasser (Ind.)	Adnan al-Jum'ah (SUP)	Yasser al-Salama (Ba'ath)	Abd al-Aziz al-Hussein (Ba'ath)	Maryam al-Mutras (Ba'ath)	Sheikh al-Kharfan (Ba'ath)	Madloul al-Aziz (Ind.)	Aytan al-Aytan (Ba'ath)
2022 by-election	Muhammad al-Raja (Ba'ath)	Burhan al-Abd al-Wahhab (Ba'ath)	Ali Adel al-Hajj Khalifah (Ba'ath)	Mahmoud al-Rayyes (Ba'ath)	Bashar al-Mutlaq (Ba'ath)	Mayyada al-Ali (Ba'ath)	Muhanna Sheikh Fayyad al-Nasser (Ind.)	Bashar Shubat (SUP)	Yasser al-Salama (Ba'ath)	Abd al-Aziz al-Hussein (Ba'ath)	Maryam al-Mutras (Ba'ath)	Sheikh al-Kharfan (Ba'ath)	Madloul al-Aziz (Ind.)	Aytan al-Aytan (Ba'ath)
2024	Ahmad al-Shattat (Ba'ath)	Sumer Zahir (Ba'ath)	Feras al-Jaham (Ba'ath)	Maisara al-Ahmad (Ba'ath)	Bashar al-Mutlaq (Ba'ath)	Ahmad al-Naser (Ba'ath)	Ali Haj Khalifeh (Ba'ath)	Khalifa Hamd (Ind.)	Yasser al-Salama (Ba'ath)	Maram al-Askar (Ba'ath)	Khaled al-Kamsh (NCP)	Bashir al-Jarrad (Ba'ath)	Madloul al-Aziz (Ind.)	Ibrahim al-Shaher (Independent)
