= Madonna Bishara =

Syrian politician

- مادونا بشارة

Second Deputy Speaker of the People's Assembly of Syria
- Incumbent
- Assumed office 12 July 2026
- President: Ahmed al-Sharaa
- Speaker: Abdul Hamid al-Awak

Member of the People's Assembly
- Incumbent
- Assumed office 12 July 2026
- Appointed by: Ahmed al-Sharaa

Personal details
- Born: Latakia Governorate, Syria
- Party: Independent
- Education: Latakia University

Madonna Bishara (Arabic: مادونا بشارة) is a Syrian politician who has served as a member alongside the second deputy speaker of the People's Assembly since July 2026.

== Career ==
Bishara was born in a Christian family in Latakia Governorate. She is a Syrian academic and researcher, holding a PhD in civil engineering. She is the head of the Construction Engineering and Management Department at the Faculty of Civil Engineering at Latakia University and is an active civil society activist.

=== Member of the People's Assembly ===
Following the release of the Syrian presidential list, she became a member of the People's Assembly.

==== Second Deputy Speaker of the People's Assembly ====
On July 12, 2026, during the inaugural session of the 23rd People's Assembly, Madonna was elected as one out of two deputy speakers of the People's Assembly.
