= Tishreen Palace =

Coordinates: 33°31′8″N 36°15′44″E

- Interactive map of the Tishreen Palace area
- Alternative names: October Palace, Al-Muhajireen Palace

General information
- Location: Damascus, Syria

Tishreen Palace (Arabic: قصر تشرين) is a former presidential palace of the President of Syria, located in Damascus. It is located in the Ar Rabwah neighborhood, south of Mount Qasioun. The building covers 10,000 square meters (108,000 square feet). During the Syrian civil war, there were reports that rebels fired mortars at the palace. The palace was used as the primary official residence of the Assad family, until the construction of the Presidential Palace on Mount Mazzeh was finished in the early 1990s.

In 2013, mortars were struck outside the southern walls.

After the Fall of the Assad regime in December 2024, Syrians ransacked and looted the palace, inviting much of the public.
