= Ghuwayran =

- District
- Country: Syria
- City: Hasakah

Population (2004 census)
  - Total: 34,191

Ghuwayran (Arabic: غويران), is a district of Hasakah, Syria.
