= Birgit Schäbler =

German historian of Middle East

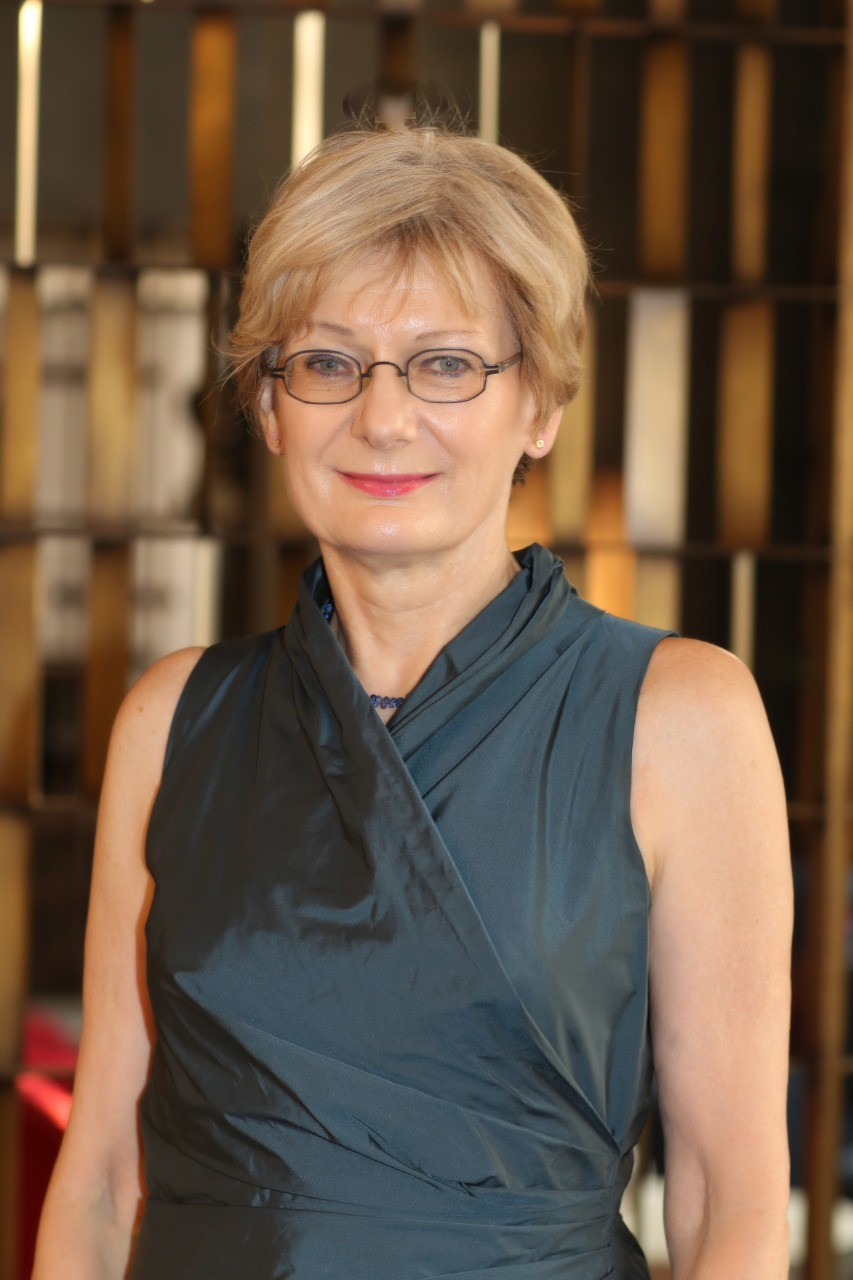

Academic background
- Education: Nürnberg, Univ.
- Thesis: Aufstände im Drusenbergland Ethnizität und Integration einer ländlichen Gesellschaft Syriens vom Osmanischen Reich bis zur staatlichen Unabhängigkeit; 1850 - 1949 (1994)

Birgit Schäbler is a historian who is known for her work on Germany, Europe, and Oriental/Islamic studies. She is a professor at the University of Erfurt, where she is in the department of Middle East History.

== Career ==
Schäbler's academic past includes time studying at the Julius-Maximilians-University of Würzburg, the University of California, Berkeley, the University of Damascus, and Harvard. In 1994, she received her doctorate with a thesis on the history of the Druzes in Syria, based on archival studies and field research in Syria. In 1997 she was a visiting professor at Duke University, followed by time at Harvard University as a fellow (1997 to 1999), and finally Georgia College & State University. In 2002, she moved to the University of Erfurt. She holds the professorship of History of West Asia (Middle East) at the Faculty of Philosophy of the University of Erfurt, and taught there from 2002 to 2017. From October 2017 to September 2022, she was the director of the Orient-Institut Beirut.

== Research interests ==
Schäbler's research combines history with Islamic studies and anthropological fieldwork to address sociological and political questions. She focuses on the social and cultural history of global modernity in its Middle Eastern manifestation. Her work posits that modern and politico-ideologized Islam today emerged in its engagement with Europe in those decades of the late 19th century, a period of radical change in the Middle East and globally. She has researched the history of the Druze Mountain (Hawran), including questions of land tenure and issues of religious alterity in Syria. She has published on issues of nationalism, Islamism, Orientalism, and the history of Oriental studies.

== Selected publications ==
- Schäbler, Birgit (2016). Moderne Muslime Ernest Renan und die Geschichte der ersten Islamdebatte 1883. Paderborn. ISBN 978-3-506-78418-6.
- Schäbler, Birgit (1996). Aufstände im Drusenbergland : ethnizität und Integration einer ländlichen Gesellschaft Syriens vom Osmanischen Reich bis zur staatlichen Unabhängigkeit 1850-1949 (1. Auflg ed.). Gotha: Perthes. ISBN 3-623-00402-2.
  - Peer review of book
- Globalization and the Muslim world : culture, religion, and modernity (1st ed.). Syracuse, N.Y.: Syracuse University Press. 2004. ISBN 0-8156-3049-2.
  - Peer review of book
