= Mouayad Ghazlan al-Qablawi =

Syrian politician

- مؤيد غزلان القبلاوي

Member of the People's Assembly
- Incumbent
- Assumed office 12 July 2026
- Appointed by: Ahmed al-Sharaa

Personal details
- Born: Tafas, Daraa, Syria
- Party: Independent

Mouayad Ghazlan al-Qablawi (Arabic: مؤيَّد غَزلان القَبلاوي) is a Syrian politician and political analyst who is currently serving as a member of the People's Assembly since 1 July 2026.

== Early life ==
al-Qablawi is from the town of Tafas in Daraa Governorate. He reportedly speaks five languages and was close to Ahmed al-Sharaa during their time in Idlib prior to the fall of the Assad regime.

== Career ==
al-Qablawi was appointed as a member of the People's Assembly by President Ahmed al-Sharaa on 1 July 2026, and was one of three candidates competing for the position of Speaker of the People's Assembly.
