= Siege of Darayya and Muadamiyat =

Siege during the Syrian Civil War

Coordinates: 33.4500°N 36.2500°E

- Part of the Rif Dimashq Governorate campaign (Syrian civil war)
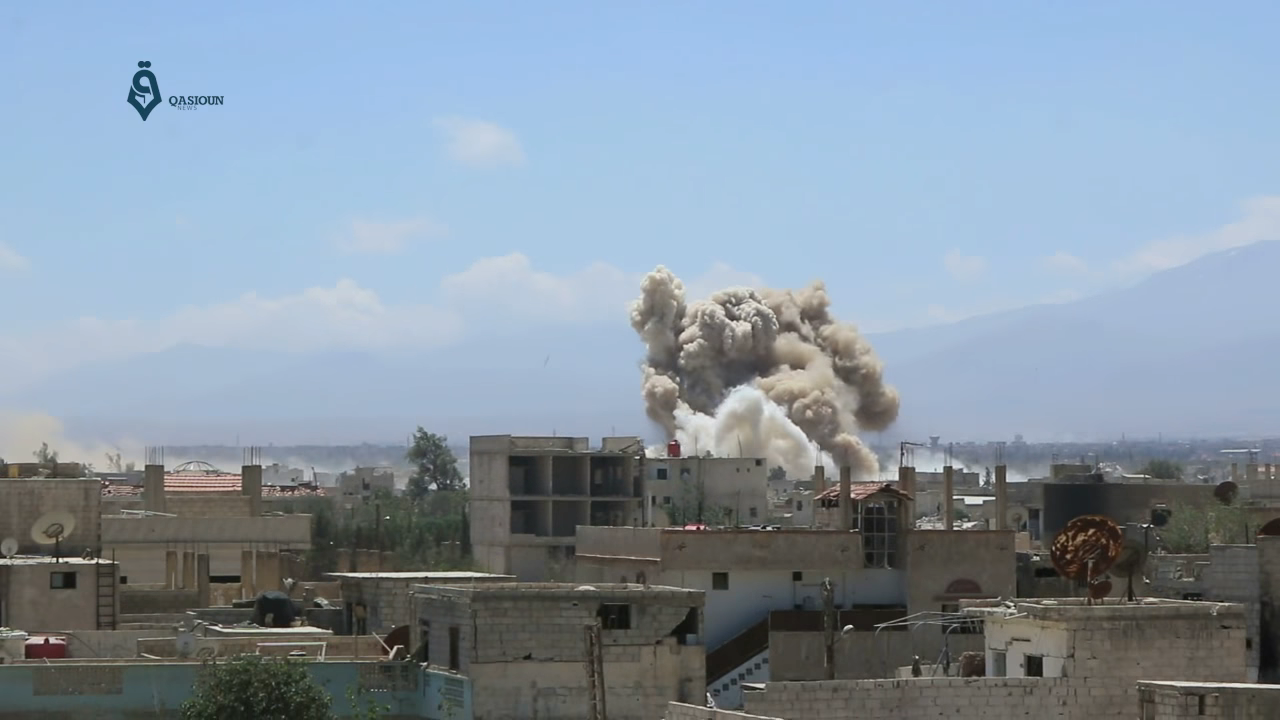
- Bombing of Darayya, 17 June 2016
Date	9 November 2012 – 19 October 2016 (3 years, 11 months, 1 week and 3 days)
Location	Darayya and Muadamiyat al-Sham, Rif Dimashq Governorate, Syria
Result	Syrian government victory
Territorial changes	Pro-government forces capture Darayya in August 2016; rebels surrender and leave the city after a ceasefire agreement; Rebels surrender and evacuate Muadamiyat al-Sham in October after 4 years of ceasefire

Belligerents
(Syria) Syrian Government; Allied militias: Hezbollah; Arab Nationalist Guard; Palestine Liberation Army	(Syrian opposition) Free Syrian Army (surrendered); Ajnad al-Sham Islamic Union (surrendered); Al-Nusra Front; Supported by: CIA (Military Operations Centre)

Commanders and leaders
Gen. Ayman Saleh (4th Brigade); Secretary General Hayder al-Juburi (Liwa Dhu al-Fiqar chief commander); Unknown Syrian Army assault leader †	(Syrian opposition) Capt. Saeed Narqash ("Abu Jamal") (surrendered) (Martyrs of Islam Brigade chief commander) (Syrian opposition) Abdul Rahim (surrendered) (Martyrs of Islam Brigade commander) (Syrian opposition) Osama Abu Zeid † (Martyrs of Islam Brigade field commander) (Syrian opposition) Ahmad Abou Al-Majd † (Martyrs of Islam Brigade field commander) (Syrian opposition) Abu Aref Alayyan † ("key rebel leader") (Syrian opposition) Khaled Khodr ("The Mayor") (surrendered) (Conquest Brigade leader); Faysal al-Shami † (Ajnad al-Sham Islamic Union commander); Abu al-‘Izz Saqr † (Ajnad al-Sham Islamic Union commander)

Units involved
Syrian Armed Forces; Syrian Army; 4th Armoured Division; 42nd Brigade; Republican Guard; 4th Brigade; National Defence Forces; Syrian Air Force; (Ba'athist Syria) Pro-government militias; Liwa Dhu al-Fiqar; Homeland Shield Brigade; Leopards of Homs; Liwa al-Imam al-Hussein; Guardians of the Dawn	(Syrian opposition) Free Syrian Army; Martyrs of Islam Brigade; Liberation Brigade; Conquest Brigade (Note: Not to be confused with the Conquest Brigade operating in northern Syria, this unit was an Islamist militia made up of natives of Muadamiyat.); Al-Fajr Brigade

Strength
3,000	<1,000 (in Darayya by mid-2016)

Casualties and losses
4th Brigade: 286 killed 276 wounded	120 killed (August 2015 – July 2016)
- 161,700 residents displaced

The siege of Darayya and Muadamiyat was launched by the Syrian Armed Forces in late 2012 after rebels took over most of the Damascus suburbs of Darayya and Muadamiyat al-Sham in November 2012. Since then, the power grid in the area was cut off as the government attempted to storm the towns multiple times. During the siege the towns were continuously hit by airstrikes from the Syrian Air Force.

On 24 August 2016 it was confirmed that the rebels and the Syrian Government made a deal in which the rebels would leave the city. They would be able to leave and would be sent up to Idlib with their families. The rest of the civilians would be relocated. The town of Muadamiyat al-Sham was also surrendered on 19 October under a similar agreement.

== The siege ==
=== 2015 ===
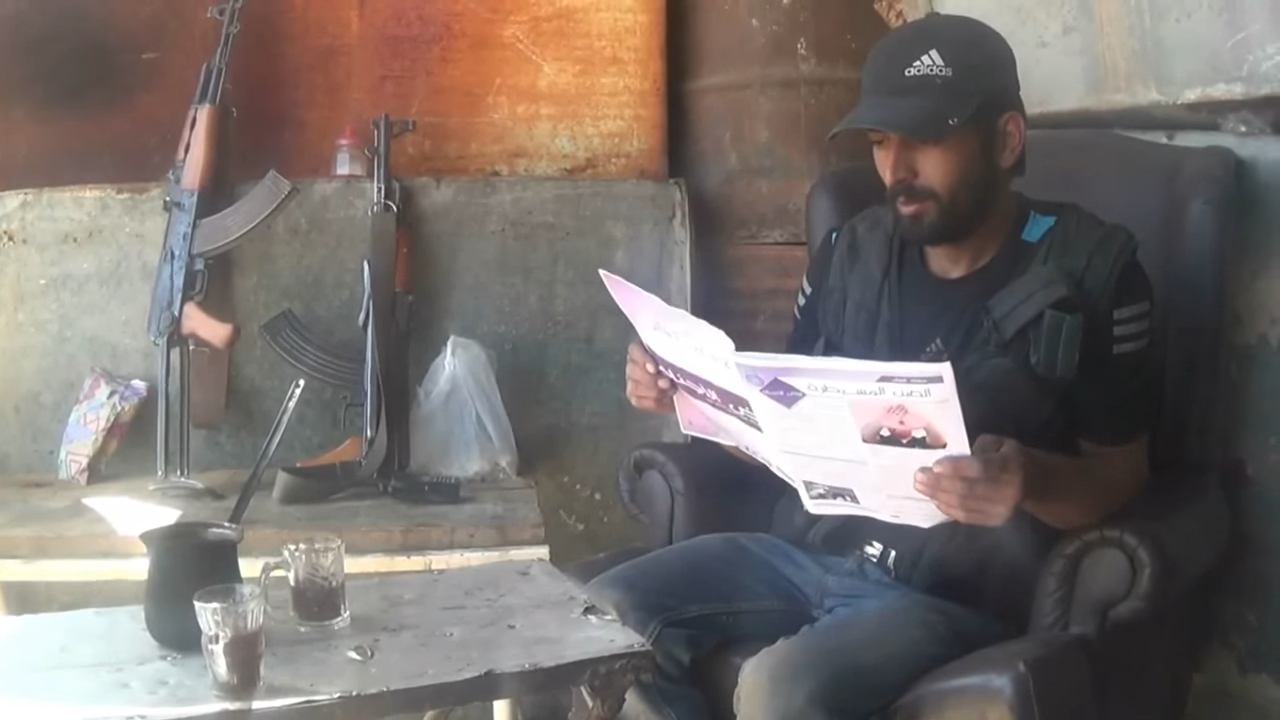
Ajnad al-Sham Islamic Union fighter on break

The rebels in Darayya launched an offensive in early August 2015, after months of preparations, in an attempt to push back government forces from the town and possibly reach the nearby Mezzeh military airport which had been used to bomb Darayya. After three days of fighting, the rebels reportedly managed to seize several strategic buildings overlooking the airport. During the clashes, 23 rebel fighters died, while the rebels claimed to have killed 70 government soldiers.

=== 2016 ===
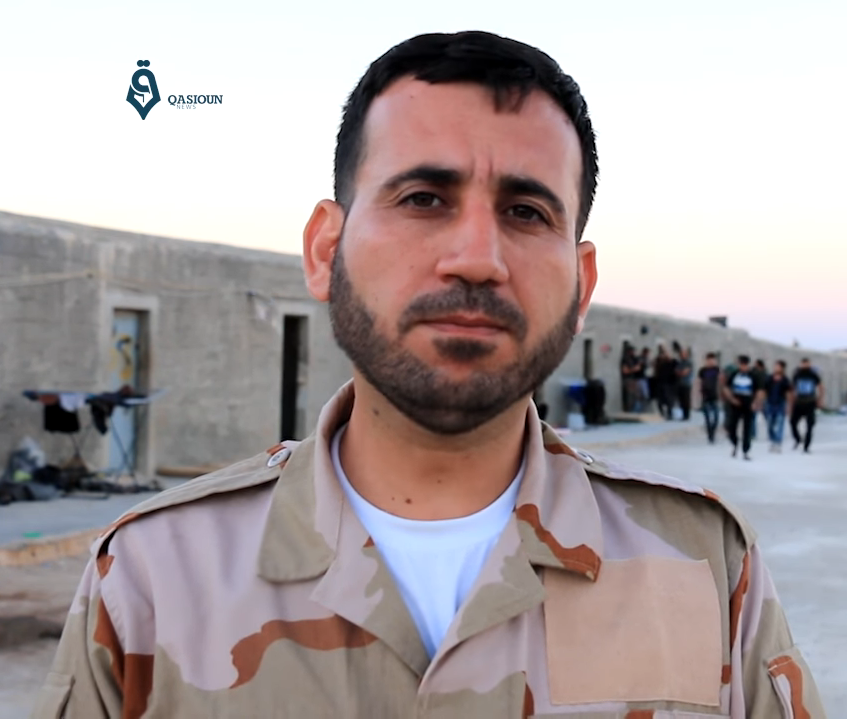
Capt. Saeed Narqash (alias "Abu Jamal"), commander of the Martyrs of Islam Brigade, in 2016

In late January 2016, the National Defence Force and the Syrian Republican Guard captured the road linking the two towns from the Ajnad al-Sham Islamic Union, cutting the two rebel-held suburbs in two. Government forces also seized several buildings from the rebels.

In late February, the Syrian Army launched an assault on Darayya and took over 20 buildings from Ajnad al-Sham, killing a rebel commander. The town was excluded from a 2-week country-wide ceasefire due to the presence of the al-Nusra Front, which is claimed by the government to control 1/5 of rebel-held Darayya.

In May, ICRC trucks carrying infant formula, vaccines, and school supplies attempted to enter Darayya, but was turned back and denied entry by the 4th Armoured Division.

On 1 June 5 trucks containing infant formula, vaccines, mosquito nets, shampoos, and wheelchairs was allowed entry in the town, with another convoy entering Muadamiyat. On the same day government forces shelled fields in the town, burning crops.

On 6 June the Criterion Brigades launched an offensive called "At Your Service Darayya" in order to draw government forces from Darayya to reinforce the front in Quneitra. The Brigades allegedly seized 2 villages, which was denied by the National Defence Forces.

Later that month on 9–10 June the first convoy of food aid since 2012 was delivered to Darayya by the World Food Programme and the Syrian Arab Red Crescent. The convoy included bags of flour to last for 4,000 people a month and other food to feed 2,400 a month. Around 8,000 people still live in the town. However, the town was hit by multiple barrel bombs on the same day. On the 16th, the government forces dropped 12 barrel bombs and advanced 42 blocks in the west and south of the town. 500 houses were razed by the government in order to build defensive structures.

On 20 June, rebel forces launched a suicide attack at a government checkpoint on the road between the towns, capturing 12 soldiers. 7 rebels were killed and soon after more than 30 barrel bombs were dropped on Darayya. The attack reportedly reopened a rebel supply line between Darayya and Muadamiyat. After losing nine checkpoints to the rebels, the Army launched a counter-offensive and retook the lost territory. As a result, Ajnad al-Sham units suffered heavy casualties, including two killed commanders.

On 24 June, the Syrian Army, backed by Hezbollah, captured over 25 farms in the Darayya, threatening to cut the rebel pocket in half, and depriving the city of its most important food source. The next day, the government formally offered the rebel groups in Darayya a surrender deal, according to which the rebels would be granted safe passage to other rebel-held areas of Damascus if they gave up their weapons. The FSA and Ajnad al-Sham commanders were given a one-week deadline to respond.

After rebel commanders refused to surrender, government forces resumed their attacks on Darayya on 30 June. On 10 July, the Syrian Army broke through the rebel lines, as it captured much of the Alaya District from Ajnad al-Sham. By this point, the government had retaken half of Darayya from the rebels, namely the eastern part. The rebels had suffered heavy casualties, with 120 fighters being killed since August 2015, and fewer than 1,000 remaining in the town. On 13 July, the Syrian Army captured all remaining rebel-held farms of Darayya.

On 15 July, the military advanced to a residential area on the southern side of Darayya, coming close to the Darayya Railway, a rebel stronghold. By this point, the rebels were under threat of the possibility that government forces could split the town in half. Two days later, government forces made more advances in a residential area of Darayya, and in the following night launched a major attack on the city center. Rebel fighters were reported to be on the verge of retreating from the Darayya Association Quarter.

On 20 July, government forces stormed the Association Quarter, seizing several buildings amid fierce fighting. Four days later, rebels reportedly repelled a government attack on southern Darayya, killing the Syrian Army assault leader in the process.

On 28 July, the government launched a new offensive in western Darayya, resulting in fierce fighting. Breaking through rebel lines, the 4th Armoured Division captured a 300 metre long and 450 metre wide strip of territory in western Darayya and killed a "key rebel leader", Abu Aref Alayyan. On the night of 1–2 August, government troops captured several buildings around the Bilal Al-Habashi Mosque after heavy clashes with Ajnad al-Sham, with the seized territory being approximately 300 meters long and 250 meters wide. On 5 August, the Army took control of an area, 1 square kilometer in size, near the Bilal Al-Habashi Mosque. Government advances continued on 7 August, as the Syrian Army captured three more building blocks. In course of the fighting, the rebel commander Ahmad Abou Al-Majd was killed.

On 14 August, the government continued its offensive, making major progress by capturing more sites in the Association Quarter and a large part of Darayya's southwestern sector. The next day, Ajnad al-Sham fighters used a secret tunnel to launch a surprise attack on the government forces, overwhelming them and capturing the Al-Wahbi and Al-Qatteh points. Even though the Republican Guard recaptured the two sites later on, the ambush was still a tactical success for the rebels, who had suffered few casualties for several killed government soldiers. On 17 August, government forces captured several building blocks near the Noureddeen Mosque and managed to enter the Railway area of Darayya that had been under rebel control since 2012.

In the early hours of 19 August, reports emerged that the last rebel "field hospital" was destroyed in airstrikes using barrel bombs containing napalm type materials. Later in the day rebel defenses partially collapsed in southern Darayya, as government forces captured the Railway Crossing, 24 building blocks and advanced into the Christian District. On 21 August, the 4th Armoured Division captured the Nour Al-Deen Mosque and two days later advanced once again on a 200-meter front, coming to within 500 meters of splitting the rebel-held part of Darayaa in two.

On 25 August after a ceasefire agreement, the rebels inside Darayya announced their plan to surrender their weapons and to evacuate themselves and their family members from the town to rebel-held areas in the Idlib Governorate in stages, while other civilians were to be re-located to government-held areas near Damascus. Over 700 fighters and 300 of their family members were part of the move which was viewed as a strategic win for government forces. The Middle East Eye, however, noted that the status of the surviving Martyrs of Islam Brigade fighters from Darayya "is now cemented as legendary amongst Syria’s opposition for their military heroics. [The group's leader Abo Jamal] is modern Syria’s Leonidas I, and his men the equivalent of the 7,000 Greeks who famously held off the 100,000 strong Persian army for seven days." It was argued that the relocated Martyrs of Islam Brigade, though not of great numbers, had gained much experience in urban warfare during the siege, and thus could also play a decisive role for the Syrian opposition in course of the 2016 Aleppo campaign.

=== Surrender of Muadamiyat al-Sham ===
Soon after the rebel surrender in Darayya, reports that rebels and civilians in Muadamiyat al-Sham were also interested in a similar deal. At the negotiations on 30 August, the 4th Armoured Division delegate requested the rebels in the town to surrender their weapons, to allow the government to enter, and to evacuate the remaining civilians. The army threatened "total war" if the terms were not met.

On 1 September, residents of Muadamiyat agreed to a deal under which the town would be surrendered and those rebels who did not wish to give up their arms will be granted safe passage to rebel-held areas of Idlib Governorate. The next day, 303 people who were from Darayya, including 62 rebels, left the town as part of the agreement. On 8 September, the Syrian government threatened to intensify bombing and shelling of Muadamiyat if rebels did not hand over the town and disarm. In response, rebels proposed to surrender and withdraw 950 rebels to areas under control of the Syrian opposition in Idlib. The Syrian government was reported to be studying the proposal.

On 10 September, a senior Syrian military officer told Al-Masdar News that a large number of opposition fighters surrendered and disarmed themselves at a government checkpoint on the outskirts of the city, asking for amnesty to which the Syrian Armed Forces agreed. On 22 September, an aid convoy from United Nations arrived in the town.

On 19 October, another deal was reached in order to evacuate remaining 700 rebels and 2,300 residents, including family members, from Moadamiyet to the Idlib Governorate. The evacuation began later in the day. The rebels who did not want to leave would have their status regularised per the agreement. The last batch of residents left the town on the following day.

== Underground library in Darayya ==
During the siege of Darayya, residents in the city collected and maintained an underground library that helped ease the disruption of the war. The library's collection ultimately held 14,000 books located in an underground facility. The library was founded in 2012 by a group of university students, who collected books from the rubble of destroyed houses. "We saw that it was vital to create a new library so that we could continue our education," former civil engineer student, Anas Ahmad told BBC. The underground library evolved into a meeting place for the community. Syrian rebel fighters and civilians not only used the collection for recreational use, but for information like health and education. The collection was ransacked and dismantled in August 2016 at the fall of Darayya by Syrian government forces.

Mike Thomson, a BBC journalist, first uncovered the story of the secret library and has written a book called Syria's Secret Library, published November 2018. He has also participated in a BBC Radio 4 podcast, where he interviewed the founders of the library and some of the residents a month before it was dismantled.
