= Martyrs of Islam Brigade =

Armed rebel group in Syria

- لواء شهداء الإسلام; Liwa Shuhada al-Islam
- Logo of the brigade.
- Leaders: Captain Saeed Narqash (nom de guerre Abu Jamal) (POW); First Warrant Officer Abu Omar; Osama Abu Zeid †; Abu Ja’far al-Homsi (died); First Lieutenant Abu Shahin (until June 2013)
- Dates active: 5 March 2013—29 January 2025
- Groups: Martyrs of Daraya Battalion; Martyrs of the Revolution Battalion; Fayha al-Sham Battalion; Lions of Tawhid Battalion; Descendants of Saladin Battalion; Lions of Sunna Battalion; Special Task Force Battalion; Artillery Company; Engineering and Air Defence Company
- Headquarters: Darayya (until 2016); Idlib Governorate (until 2025)
- Active regions: Damascus and Rif Dimashq Governorate (until 2016); Idlib Governorate (since 2016); Hama Governorate (since 2016)
- Ideology: Islamism
- Size: 700 (2016)
- Part of: (Syrian opposition) Free Syrian Army: Southern Front (February 2014–September 2016); National Front for Liberation (since May 2018); Sham Legion (since June 2018)
- Wars: the Syrian civil war

The Martyrs of Islam Brigade (Arabic: لواء شهداء الإسلام, romanized: Liwa Shuhada al-Islam) is a Syrian rebel group formed in the Damascus suburb of Darayya and was the main group that operated in the suburb. It was the only Syrian rebel group to be completely under the authority of a local city council and received U.S.-made BGM-71 TOW anti-tank missiles despite the tight siege Darayya was in between 2012 and 2016.

== Military structure ==
Between 2013 and 2016, the highest level of command for the group was the Local Council of Daraya City. The group is commanded by Saeed Narqash (nom de guerre Abu Jamal), a captain who defected from the Syrian Army. The group's initial chief of staff was First Lieutenant Abu Shahin, who left the group to form another in June 2013, while its commander of operations was First Warrant Officer Abu Omar. A military academy was established in Daraya when it was controlled by the group.

== History ==
=== Siege of Daraya ===
The Martyrs of Islam Brigade was formed on 5 March 2013 as a merger of 9 rebel units affiliated with the Free Syrian Army in Daraya.

On 14 February 2014, the group signed a convention which established the Southern Front. As part of the Southern Front's declaration of principles which the Martyrs of Islam Brigade was a signatory member of, the groups pledged to overthrow the Syrian government of Bashar al-Assad and fight for human rights in Syria in accordance with the International Bill of Human Rights.

Since August 2015, more than 120 rebels were killed in Daraya, and by July 2016, less than 1,000 rebels from the Martyrs of Islam Brigade and the Ajnad al-Sham Islamic Union remained in the suburb.

=== Post-Daraya ===
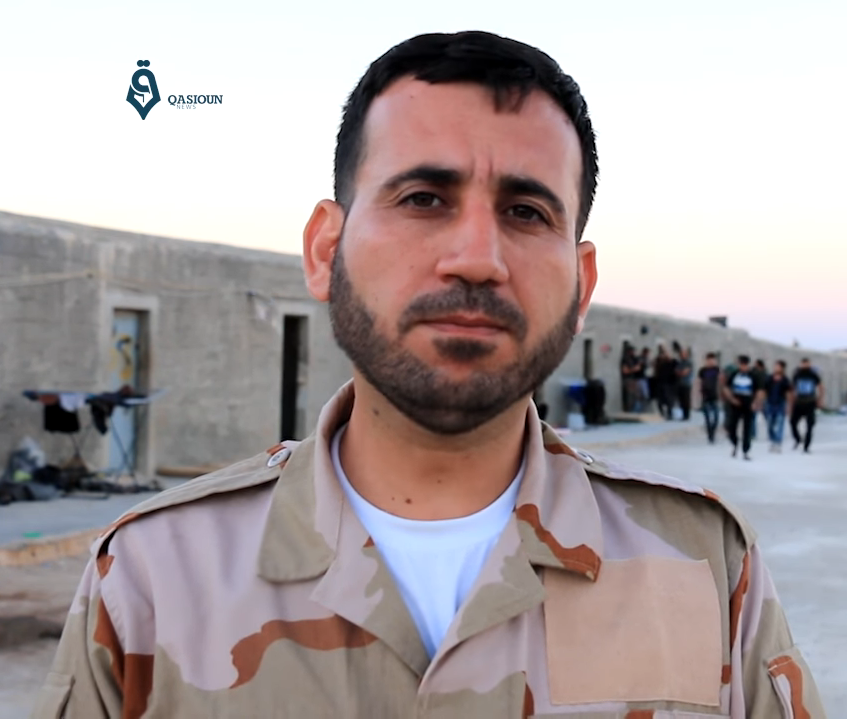
Capt. Saeed Narqash in the Idlib Governorate, September 2016

In September 2016, after 4 years of siege in Daraya and an agreement with the Syrian Armed Forces, all the remaining 700 fighters from the Martyrs of Islam Brigade evacuated from Daraya to the Idlib Governorate in the north. Since then, its commander, Capt. Saeed Narqash, denounced the Southern Front and cut all links with it, with sources stating that the group was planning to join Jaysh al-Islam instead. The commander denied this and emphasized that it will become an independent faction. Immediately after the group's arrival in Idlib, some of its "best fighters" were captured by al-Qaeda's al-Nusra Front. They were eventually released, and the group gradually disintegrated. Capt. Narqash briefly participated in the Astana talks in January 2017, but soon withdrew.

In March 2017, the group participated in the Tahrir al-Sham (HTS)-led Hama offensive.

On 24 April 2018, Saeed Narqash was captured by unidentified assailants in the town of Sarmada. The Martyrs of Islam Brigade accused Tahrir al-Sham fighters of raiding Narqash's house, but Abu Ayman al-Shami, security official of HTS, denied involvement and stated that HTS was not notified of the incident. On 26 May, Narqash's captors released a video showing him being handcuffed and held in an unknown location, where he was forced to explain his participation in the Astana talks, and claimed that Turkish and US intelligence requested him to join the fight against HTS. HTS again denied involvement.

In May 2018, along with 10 other rebel groups in northwestern Syria, the Martyrs of Islam Brigade formed the National Front for Liberation, which was officially announced on 28 May. On 5 June, the group joined the Sham Legion, also part of the National Front for Liberation.

== See also ==
- List of armed groups in the Syrian Civil War
