= Mardin Artuklu University =

Public university in Mardin, Turkey

- Established: 2007
- Location: Mardin, Turkey
- Website: Official website

Mardin Artuklu University (MAU) is a university located in Mardin, Turkey. It was established in 2007.

== Language programs ==
In 2009, the university was allowed to open a Kurdish language department by the Higher Education Board. Before, the Kurdish language was banned for long periods of time in Turkey. In 2011, MAU was the first university to have a Kurdish language and literature department. By 2014, about 900 students have graduated from the Kurdish language department. The university has also had a professor for the Zaza language since 2020. It also teaches Aramaic: Classical Syriac and modern Surayt.
