= 2025 Syrian parliamentary election =

- 5 October 2025 – 24 May 2026

140 of the 210 members in the People's Assembly 106 seats needed for a majority
- Registered: 6,817 electoral college members
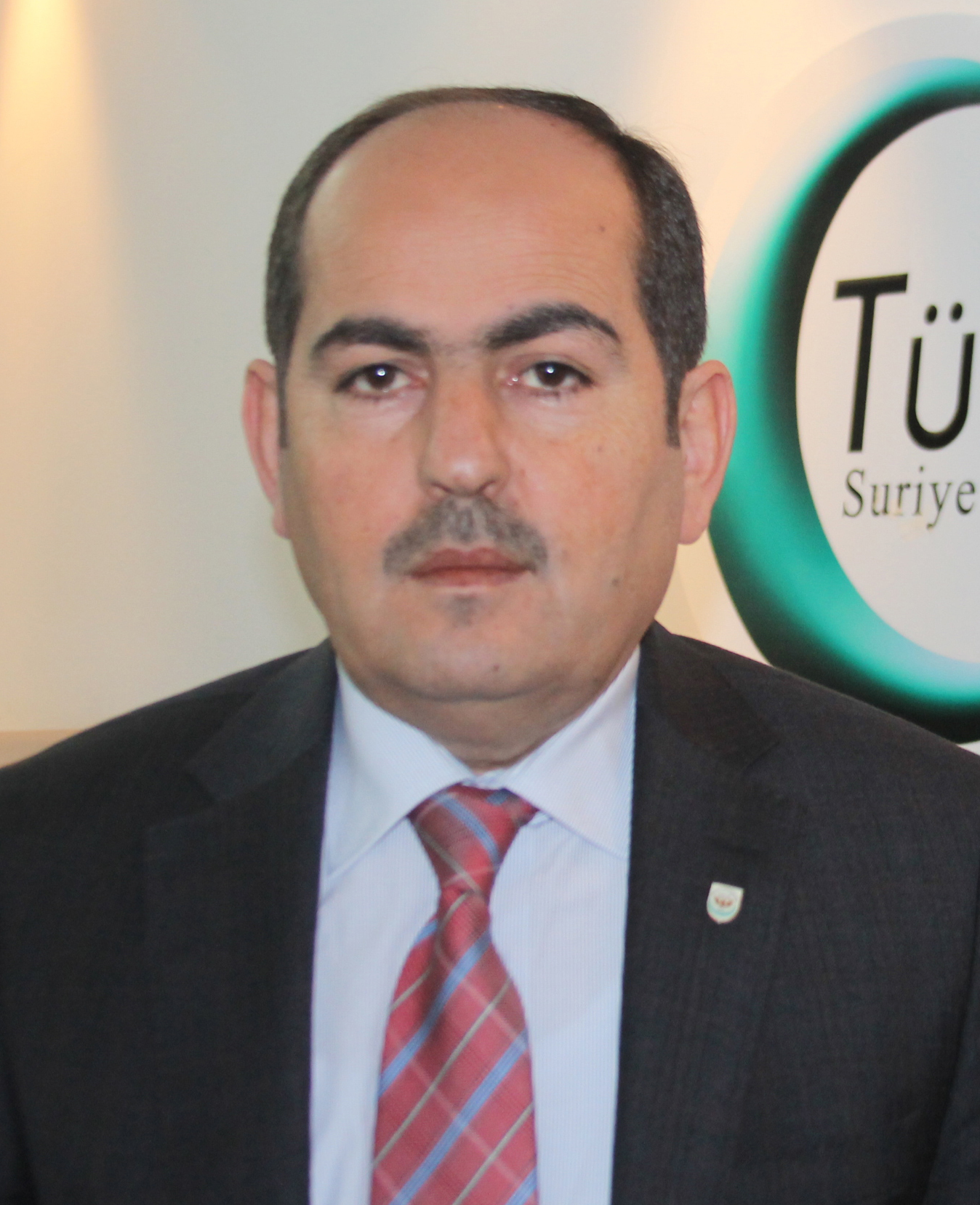
	First party	Second party	Third party
	Ind	KDP
Leader			Abdurrahman Mustafa
Party	Independent	KDPS	STM
Alliance		ENKS
Seats won	132 (Note: Including one seat, last held by an independent, who died before taking office.)	3	0
Seats after	197 (Note: De-jure 206 seats, counting candidates whom were members of political parties de-facto represented, though not officially registered, in the People's Assembly.)	4	1
	Fourth party	Fifth party	Sixth party
Leader	Radwan Sido	Fasla Youssef	Gabriel Moushe Gawrieh
Party	KDEP	KDUP	ADO
Alliance	ENKS	ENKS
Seats won	1	1	0
Seats after	1	1	1
	Seventh party
Leader	Anas al-Abdah
Party	MJD-S
Seats won	0
Seats after	1
- Result by electoral district
Speaker before election
Hammouda Sabbagh (2024)
Ba'ath Party
Elected Speaker
Abdul Hamid al-Awak (2026)
Independent

Parliamentary elections were initially held in Syria on 5 October 2025, with subsequent by-elections being held on 23 October 2025, 17 March 2026, and on 24 May 2026 to elect 140 of the 210 members of the People's Assembly, the unicameral legislature of Syria. The election was the first to be held since the fall of the Ba'athist-led regime in December 2024, and the first to be conducted under the Syrian transitional government led by President Ahmed al-Sharaa.

The election was held over multiple nonconsecutive days, with 119 MPs elected on 5 October 2025, and 18 MPs being elected in subsequent elections. As of July 2026, the 3 seats in Suwayda Governorate are currently vacant due to conflicts between government forces and the Druze-led Administrative Council of Jabal Bashan, in which the council controls most of Suwayda Governorate, and the government controls parts of the northern half of the governorate.

Unlike previous elections in Syria, the 2025 elections and subsequent 2026 elections were held under a provisional, indirect electoral system. Of the 210 seats, 140 seats were allocated to be filled through a constituency-based electoral college system. Members were selected by local committees appointed by the government. The remaining 70 seats within the People's Assembly were appointed directly by the president, with no seats being elected by direct popular vote.

== Background ==
The People's Assembly is Syria's unicameral legislature. Under the Ba'athist-led regime, the Assembly was characterised as "primarily a debating club", rubber-stamping the president's directives. Elections to the People's Assembly were previously held by direct popular vote in multi-member constituencies. In practice, however, roughly two-thirds of the seats were consistently won by the Ba'ath Party and its allies, with the remaining seats held by independents.

Following the 2024 Syrian opposition offensives and the formation of the Syrian caretaker government, the People's Assembly elected in the July 2024 Syrian parliamentary election was formally dissolved on 29 January 2025 and replaced by an interim Legislative Council. Following the adoption of the Constitutional Declaration of the Syrian Arab Republic, the People's Assembly was re-established, under which one-third of MPs were to be appointed by the president. Presidential Decree 66, which established the 11-member Higher Committee for People's Assembly Elections (Arabic: اللجنة العليا لانتخابات مجلس الشعب السوري), was issued on 13 June. The committee, chaired by Mohammed Taha al-Ahmed, was responsible for overseeing the formation of electoral subcommittees, which elected the remaining two-thirds of the members of parliament (MPs).

Syrian President Ahmed al-Sharaa stated that there was a lack of infrastructure to allow for direct elections, and Syrian human rights lawyer Anwar al-Bunni said that "the absence of political work, parties, and political activism", in addition to the need to register displaced people and deceased people, as well as the Assad regime granting citizenship to large numbers of Iranian militants, meant that the indirect system was 'logical' until the infrastructure for direct elections could be established, which could take up to four years to organise.

== Date of the election ==
In June 2025, The Higher Committee for People's Assembly Elections estimated that the process of organising elections would take between 60 and 90 days to complete. The original plan involved the election taking place on the same day across all of Syria, originally estimated to be at the end of August. The election date was then updated in late July 2025 to be expected to fall between 15 and 20 September.

On 14 September, Tareq al-Kurdi, a member of the electoral committee's legal committee, announced that the elections had been postponed from September due to the high number of applications. Nawar Najmeh, the electoral committee's spokesperson said that the elections were expected to take place before the end of September. On 21 September, the final date was announced to be 5 October, and take place between 9:00 until 12:00; however, if not all members of the electoral college had cast their votes before that time, it would be extended until 16:00.

In addition to the election of most seats on 5 October 2025, elections to remaining seats were held on 23 October 2025, 17 March 2026, and on 24 May 2026.

== Electoral system ==
In July, election committee chair Mohammed Taha al-Ahmad stated that a presidential decree was going to be issued in order to beginning the planning of a new electoral system, which would cover: "membership conditions... campaign mechanisms, a code of conduct for voters and candidates, and provisions ensuring women's participation of at least 20%". Presidential Decree 143 of 2025 was issued on 20 August which approved the electoral system for the elections.

=== Number of MPs ===
Under initial plans for a new parliament, it would have consisted of 150 MPs, with 100 MPs being elected and 50 MPs being appointed by the president of Syria, but on 27 July 2025 the committee announced that the assembly would be expanded to seat 210 MPs, with 140 MPs (two thirds) being elected and the remaining 70 MPs (a third) being appointed. The Higher Committee chair emphasised that the seats appointed by the president were to be reserved for "highly skilled technocrats to fill gaps that may arise from the electoral process and ensure diverse representation".

=== Electoral college system ===
The temporary electoral framework replaces direct elections, used under the former regime, with an indirect system. Instead of direct votes, subcommittees will choose delegates that form one electoral college per constituency, which in turn elects MPs. The number of members on each governorate's sub-committee matches the number of MPs the governorate will elect. The sub-committees collect applications from individuals wishing to serve as delegates, who vote to elect an MP. Most constituencies have 150 delegates, but larger constituencies will have more, such as Damascus with 450. In total, 6,817 people were chosen as electors for the electoral college.

According to the committee, this approach was intended to suit the transitional and legislative nature of the new parliament due to the lack of infrastructure, such as reliable census data and voter registration to conduct direct elections. According to the committee, the system was intended to favour technocrats and academics, targeting 70% of MPs being academics or experts, and 30% being notable community figures (preferably with academic qualifications as well). Delegates were then selected to join the electoral college by the governorate's sub-committee according to 17 criteria. There were quotas mandating that each electoral college have at least 20% of delegates being women, and at least 3% with a disability.

Each governorate's electoral subcommittee was to nominate around 150 people per constituency, forming a local electoral college, from which a single or few parliamentary representatives will be elected. 14 subcommittees were to be formed, one per governorate.

The preliminary list of the members of the electoral college members was released on 24 September, allowing a one-day period for submitting objections. The final list was published on 26 September, and candidacy applications for MPs were open between 27 and 28 September.

==== Equality ====
To discuss views and proposals, the Higher Committee met with several groups, including the Syrian Women's Advisory Council, representatives of unions and syndicates, Patriarch Aphrem II of the Syriac Orthodox Church, civil society leaders, the Journalists Union, and a delegation from Daraa. Syrian human rights lawyer Anwar al-Bunni also suggested that the president could appoint MPs to counter any lost balance for marginalised groups from the election committees.

=== Constituencies ===
The seats are elected by constituencies, with varying numbers of MPs allocated to each constituency. Committee member Mohammed Wali stated that "Each [governorate] has several [constituencies], each [constituency] produces several members of parliament". There are 60 constituencies, with 49 electing an MP on election day, and 2 further electing an MP on 23 October. Constituencies with more than 600,000 residents will elect three members for every additional 250,000 residents.

The final distribution of seats by governorate were released on 26 August 2025:

1. Aleppo (32)
2. Damascus (10)
3. Rif Dimashq (12)
4. Homs (12)
5. Hama (12)
6. Idlib (12)
7. Latakia (7)
8. Deir ez-Zor (10)
9. Al-Hasakah (10)
10. Tartus (5)
11. Daraa (6)
12. Raqqa (6)
13. Suwayda (3)
14. Quneitra (3)

=== Term ===
The committee has also estimated that MPs will serve an expected term of five years. However, elections are supposed to be renewed after 30 months, since the term of the People's Assembly is set at 30 months in accordance with the constitutional declaration. This means that although the committee's mandate was initially conceived as a longer-term assignment, it remains subject to the legislative cycle established by the constitutional framework.

=== Candidacy ===
The requirements for candidacy are that the candidate must:

- Have been a Syrian citizen since before 2011.
- Have been registered in the civil registry within its electoral district, or be a resident for five consecutive years before 2011.
- Have legal capacity.
- Be at least twenty-five years old.
- Have good conduct.
- Have not have been convicted of a felony or a crime against honour, except for cases of a political or security nature.
- Should not have run for president after 2011.
- Have never been a member of the People's Assembly or a candidate in the post-2011 period unless defection is proven.
- Have not been a supporter of the former regime and terrorist organisations in any way, and not to be an advocate of secession, division or bullying abroad.
- Have not been affiliated with the armed forces or security services.
- Have not been a member of the Higher Committee, subcommittees or appeals committees.
- Have not been a minister, governor, deputy or assistant.
- Have been committed to the provisions of the Constitutional Declaration.
- Hold an accredited university degree or its equivalent for the category of competencies.
- Have a high school diploma for the category of notables.
- Be a member of that electoral college.

=== Monitoring ===
The committee chair stated that, to maximise transparency, the election will be monitored by international organisations with the committee's coordination, having full freedom to contest lists and results. EU diplomats expressed a desire to visit the sub-committees and electoral districts, especially on election day, which was welcomed by the Higher Committee.

The Higher Committee additionally created an appeals committee for each governorate, and for the Syrian Bar Association to appoint a lawyer for each of the constituencies as a legal observer.

Subcommittee members took the legal oath on 3 September, and electoral bodies began selection on 7 September.

== Regional postponements ==
The Higher Committee for the Elections of the People's Assembly had expressed a desire to hold elections throughout Syria, including areas under the control of the Kurdish-led Democratic Autonomous Administration of North and East Syria (DAANES), and specifically mentioned the governorates of Raqqa and Al-Hasakah. In the event elections in the regions were not feasible, the committee stated it would look at working with locals to ensure participation through indirect methods.

On 23 August, the Syrian transitional government announced that elections would not be held in the Druze-controlled governorate of Suwayda and the areas of Al-Hasakah and Raqqa. The Higher Committee for People's Assembly Elections said the ballot was delayed in all three areas until a "safe environment" was in place, according to SANA state news agency.

In response, the DAANES affirmed that the planned elections were not democratic and "do not in any way reflect the will of the Syrian people". It criticised the characterisation of areas under DAANES control as "unsafe" and argued that it would "justify the policy of denial" against more than five million Syrians. It called on organisations like the United Nations not to recognise these elections.

However, the election committee later decided to hold elections in some areas of Raqqa and Hasakah governorates. The members of their sub-committees took the legal oath on 22 September. Elections were planned to be held in the Ma'adan, Tell Abyad, (Gire Spri) and Ras al-Ayn (Sari Kani) districts, which are under the control of the Syrian transitional government and the Syrian National Army factions. But the election of these areas and two members from the Ayn al-Arab District in Aleppo Governorate were also delayed. The preliminary list of electoral college members in Tal Abyad and Ras Al-Ayn were issued on 12 October for appeals.

On 17 February 2026, the Higher Committee issued its decision on the composition of the Raqqa and Tabqa subcommittees, with the receipt of applications for membership of the electoral colleges beginning on 23 February for Raqqa District and Tabqa District constituencies, with committee spokesperson Nawar Najma stating that, once the election preparation in Raqqa had been completed, preparations would move to the remaining constituencies that did not have elections so that Parliament could eventually convene. The elections for Raqqa and Tabqa constituencies were expected to take place in the week of 16 March 2026, and polls opened on 17 March 2026, with 126 votes cast out of 150 voters in Raqqa, and 42 votes cast out of 50 voters in Tabqa. Plans to host elections in Hasakah are currently ongoing. On 18 April, the Higher Committee arrived in Hasakah to begin discussions with the governor of Hasakah to begin to form an electoral subcommittee. On 6 May, the Higher Committee formed a judicial panel for Hasakah, al-Malikiyah and Qamishli constituencies, as well as for Ayn al-Arab constituency. Subcommittee members were selected on 10 May 2026.

== Campaigning during the election ==
=== Nominations and campaigning dates ===
Nominations closed on 28 September, beginning the campaign period. 1,578 candidates were nominated, with 221 being women (14%). Voting on election day occurred from 9:00 on 5 October, and was planned to continue until polls close from approximately 12:00 or until 16:00 if some electoral college members had not voted by that time. Afterwards, votes would then be counted. The campaign period finished on 3 October, with 4 October being an "electoral silence" day. One day of election silence was observed before the scheduled election day.

=== Renaming the People's Assembly ===
One of the ongoing discussions in the Syrian election is the future structure of the People's Assembly. Committee spokesperson Nawar Najma said that discussions were taking place on whether to return to "one of the Assembly's former names, such as the House of Representatives or Parliament", due to the "negative connotations by many Syrians of the name".

== Results ==
The preliminary results were released as Higher Committee Decision 66 on 6 October at 14:18 AST on the Higher Committee's telegram page, with an official press conference at 17:00 to announce the official results.

The Muslim Brotherhood in Syria secured "a few seats" through its "allied candidates", who are currently unknown. Reportedly, 25 winning candidates had ties to the Muslim Brotherhood, and their list in Aleppo led by Azzam al-Khanji made a "strong impression", according to Syria in Transition.

Out of the 140 seats allocated for the electoral college, 119 were elected after elections were postponed due to "security concerns" in Raqqa, Al-Hasakah, and Suwayda Governorate. Out of those elected, six were women and 10 were representatives of religious and ethnic minorities, including Kurds, Christians, and two Alawites. After the election, the Syrian government acknowledged "shortcomings" in female and minority representation, and promised that the president-appointed seats may be used to compensate for the underrepresentation.

On 23 October 2025, elections were held to elect three members for the Ras al-Ayn District in Al-Hasakah Governorate and Tal Abyad district in Raqqa Governorate.

On 17 March 2026, elections were held in Raqqa, Tabqa and Tal Abyad. On 24 May 2026, elections were held in Ayn al-Arab District and Hasakah Governorate.

Graph of the party split among 210 seats.
Party or alliance		Votes	%	Seats	+/–
Kurdish National Council	Kurdistan Democratic Party of Syria			5	New
Kurdish National Council	Kurdistan Democratic Unity Party			1	New
Kurdish National Council	Kurdish Democratic Equality Party in Syria			1	New
Assyrian Democratic Organization				1	New
Movement for Justice and Development in Syria				1	New
Syrian Turkmen Assembly				1	New
Muslim Brotherhood of Syria				25	+25
Independents				171	+104
Vacant				4	–
Total				210	–40
Total votes		6,000	–		
Registered voters/turnout		6,000	100.00		

== Reactions and analysis ==
Two thirds of the 210 seats were elected indirectly, with another third being directly appointed by president Ahmed al-Sharaa. Furthermore, Kurdish-majority areas and the Druze province of Suwayda were excluded from the election, though the former would later host elections. Some opposition members feared a mere facade without real change. That was due to the limited power of parliament; the president was accountable to it and the People's Assembly could only repeal the president's decrees with a two-thirds majority, which can be prevented by the appointed members.

Higher Committee spokesperson Nawar Najma said that "the unsatisfactory results for Syrian women's representation, and the fact that Christian representation was limited to two seats, a weak representation relative to the number of Christians in Syria" was "among the most significant shortcomings" of the election.

=== Individual ===
Syrian human rights lawyer Anwar al-Bunni, director of the Syrian Centre for Legal Studies and Research, has described the process as a pragmatic step given Syria's current conditions. He acknowledged the lack of infrastructure and civil documentation, and emphasised the importance of including civil society and local leadership in transitional governance structures. Al-Bunni noted that this Assembly's decisions could be subject to future review, amendment, or repeal once popular elections are feasible.

Birgit Schäbler, historian and professor at the University of Erfurt and director of the Orient-Institut Beirut until 2022, said in early August 2025 that she did not expect the Druze to boycott the election, nor other minority groups, "provided the government respects their regional and local interests".

However, journalist Jasim Al-Azzawi wrote for Al Jazeera English that the elections required "genuine security and reconciliation", to avoid deepening existing sectarian divides.

=== National ===
- Democratic Autonomous Administration of North and East Syria: In response to the postponement of elections in the areas under DAANES control, the DAANES affirmed that the planned elections would "not [be] democratic" and "[would] not in any way reflect the will of the Syrian people".

=== International ===
- European Union Chargé d'affaires for Syria, Michael Unmacht, said that the European Union welcomed the formation of the Supreme Election Committee, and that the European Union would "offer its expertise in support of the transitional legislative authority".
- United Nations Special envoy for Syria, Geir Otto Pedersen, also welcomed the announcement of the formation of the Supreme Election Committee. Deputy envoy for Syria, Najat Rochdi, criticised the results of the election due to the underrepresentation of women.
- Germany: The Federal Ministry for Economic Cooperation and Development and Federal Foreign Office released a joint statement saying that the election was an important step towards broader political participation, and emphasised Germany's support for an inclusive political process.

== Sitting ==
On 31 October 2025, MPs had not been told when the first session of the People's Assembly would sit, how often it would sit, or the salary of members. Al-Sharaa had been expected to announce his appointed MPs on 8 December 2025, but did not. The general amnesty issued by al-Sharaa on 18 February 2026 re-opened debates as to why Parliament had still not convened, leaving Syria without a parliament for over a year. Officials said that the delay in convening the Parliament was due to the need to complete the postponed elections, which began in February 2026. Al-Sharaa said that the first session of the People's Assembly had been delayed as the state preferred to wait until all the elections were completed.

While participating in a meeting at the Royal Institute of International Affairs on 31 March 2026, Al-Sharaa announced that the People's Assembly would be seated within the next month. Hawar News Agency reported that the first session of the People's Assembly would be held on 8 June 2026, though this did not occur. Omar Gharibo, MP for As-Safira and Dayr Hafir, said that he expected the People's Assembly to hold its first session in June, but without an exact date. The UN deputy special envoy for Syria stated that the delay was generating anxiety, and that the People's Assembly should be constituted so that executive action could be overseen and that minorities and women could be represented.

=== Appointed members ===
On 30 June, it was officially confirmed that the list of al-Sharaa's appointees would be released on 1 July. Al-Sharaa's appointees were chosen by a committee that completed a series of meetings and closed interviews conducted between 15 and 21 June, interviewing 100 candidates. The appointments were officially announced on 1 July, with 15 women appointed. The Secretary-General of the People's Assembly, Muhammad Hamza Shamout, explained that the "supplementary third" of the Assembly's members comprises 23 notables and 47 qualified professionals, including 12 with master's degrees and 17 with PhDs.

=== Inaugural session ===
Mohammed Taha al-Ahmed, chairman of the Higher Committee for People's Assembly Elections, said that the first session of the People's Assembly would be convened on 6 July, including the swearing-in of all members, the election of the presidential office, and the formation of a special committee to establish the council's internal regulations; however, a day prior to the scheduled date, al-Ahmed would announce that the inaugural session of the People's Assembly would be postponed to a later date.

Sources to Hawar News said that the session would take place on the following Sunday, and that the delay was whilst the Higher Elections Committee considered amendments to the procedures governing the inaugural session, allowing it to convene even if Sharaa was unable to attend, and that several procedural arrangements had yet to be finalised, such as either an individual, or collective, oath-taking. This was controversial as it may prevent MPs from taking the oath in Kurdish or using a different religious formulation. The same sources also indicated the delay was for the mechanism for electing the Speaker, deputy speakers, and secretary to be finalised, as the Constitutional Declaration simply reads they are to be elected with "a majority", not specifying a relative majority (highest number of votes), or an absolute majority (50%+1) and whether it is a majority of all members, or all members present.

The first session of the assembly took place on 12 July. During the session, members took a collective oath before President Ahmed al-Sharaa. Ahmed al-Omar, Wissam Zaghloul, and Bishr Hawi, were appointed to a temporary legal committee tasked with overseeing the electoral process for the selection of the assembly's leadership. The presiding officer of the first session, until a speaker had been elected, was Osama al-Assaf. Al-Assaf had opened the nomination process for the position of Speaker. Three members submitted their candidacies for the position of Speaker of the People's Assembly: Abdul Hamid al-Awak, Moayad Hayel al-Qablawi, and Mohammad Ramez Koraj.

The members of the People's Assembly elected al-Awak as Speaker with 99 votes out of 205 ballots cast in a secret ballot, defeating al-Qablawi, who received 75 votes, and Koraj, who received 31 votes. One blank ballot was declared invalid, according to Anadolu Agency. Al-Awak was the first person to hold the position of Speaker of the People's Assembly since the fall of the Assad regime.

The members of the Syrian People's Assembly elected Mustafa al-Mousa as first deputy speaker, Madonna Bishara as second deputy speaker, and Mu'ayyad Habib as secretary. Moussa received 122 votes and Bishara 67 votes from among 10 candidates competing for the two deputy speaker positions, while Habib was elected secretary with 87 votes.

== See also ==
- 2024 Rojava local elections
