= Member of the People's Assembly (Syria) =

Legislative position in Syria

- عضو مجلس الشعب (Arabic)
- Emblem of Syria
- Incumbent; 22nd People's Assembly since 12 July 2026
- People's Assembly
- Type: Member of Parliament
- Status: Active
- Abbreviation: MP
- Member of: People's Assembly
- Reports to: Speaker
- Seat: Damascus
- Appointer: Elected (indirectly) or appointed (transitional framework)
- Term length: 30 months, renewable
- Constituting instrument: Constitutional Declaration Of Syria
- Formation: 1930; 96 years ago (as Chamber of Deputies) 2025; 1 year ago (current form)

A member of the People's Assembly (Arabic: عضو مجلس الشعب, ʿuḍw Majlis al-Shaʿb) is a legislator who serves in the People's Assembly, the unicameral legislature of Syria.

The role is analogous to that of a member of parliament (MP) or deputy in other systems. Members typically participate in legislation, oversight of the executive, approval of budgets and development plans, and related parliamentary functions, subject to the constitution or transitional framework of the country concerned.

The current transitional People's Assembly of Syria consists of 210 members; 140 members are selected indirectly through local electoral colleges, whilst 70 members are appointed directly by the president of Syria.

== Eligibility criteria ==
In order to qualify to stand for election to Parliament, an individual is required to be:

- A citizen of Syria
- At least 25 years old

== Disqualification grounds ==
An individual is disqualified from standing for election in the People's Assembly in the event they:

- Are convicted for a felony or crime involving moral turpitude
- Have lost legal capacity or good character
- Hold an office of profit in service of the Republic that disqualifies them from election.
- Support for the former Ba'athist-led regime, terrorist organisations, secessionist agendas or foreign interference

== Term limits ==
The term of the transitional People's Assembly is 30 months and are renewable, as stated in the Constitutional Declaration.

== Powers of members of the People's Assembly ==
The broad powers and responsibilities of members of the People's Assembly include:

- Proposing, debating and enacting laws
- Approving the general state budget
- Amending or repealing existing laws
- Contributing to the transitional process, including working on drafting a permanent constitution and future electoral legislation
- Ratifying international treaties and agreements

== Remuneration, privileges, and allowances ==
All members of the People's Assembly may only gain parliamentary immunity when conducting parliamentary work within the People's Assembly, and will still be subject to criminal prosecution outside of the People's Assembly.

Abdul-Nasser al-Hawshan said in an interview with the Syrian News Channel that Assembly members will receive a monthly grant of US$1,500 (US$18,000 a year), plus US$50 for each sitting attended and a housing allowance of US$300 for six months; he said the amounts were not necessarily final, as the final salary had not been settled within the draft budget. Nawar Najma told Al-Quds Al-Arabi that People's Assembly members receive a salary of US$1,500, with allowances for attending sittings or carrying out other tasks, and a housing allowance of US$500 for members living more than 150 kilometres from Damascus; he acknowledged that the sum might appear high against Syrian wages, with a public-sector minimum wage of under US$100, but argued that the problem lay in the low wage level, and that financial independence helps secure members' integrity.

The disclosure drew criticism on social media amid the country's economic crisis, and no official schedule setting the amounts definitively had been published. Deputy Speaker Mustafa al-Mousa said a housing allowance had been set for members from outside Damascus, as the Assembly's own residential buildings needed rehabilitation before they could be used.

== Members ==
The current People's Assembly is the 22nd People's Assembly, elected in the 2025 parliamentary election. The 22nd People's Assembly held its inaugural session on 12 July 2026.

== See also ==
- People's Assembly of Syria
- Constitutional Declaration of the Syrian Arab Republic
