= Battle of Safira =

Military operation in Syria

Battle of As-Safira
- Part of the Syrian Civil War
Date	6–19 February 2013 (1 week and 6 days)
Location	As-Safira, Syria
Result	Indecisive: Rebel forces capture most of the town, but suffer heavy losses; Syrian Army continues to hold the military factory and establishes a land route for reinforcements

Belligerents
Al-Nusra Front	Syrian Armed Forces

Units involved
Unknown	9th Armoured Division; Independent Artillery Brigade; Independent Infantry Brigade

Strength
1,600 fighters	1,200 soldiers

Casualties and losses
200+ killed	7+ killed

The Battle of Safira was fought in February 2013, when rebel forces attacked the town of al-Safira, which holds a key position on the M5 Motorway, where a major battle for the city had been raging for the previous seven months. Al-Safira is also next to important weapon factories and the government's largest chemical weapons stockpiles.

== Battle ==
Situation in as-Safira mid-March 2013

On 6 February 2013, violent clashes took place between Al-Nusra Front and several other rebel battalions and government forces south of Al-Safira city, along with violent bombardment on some areas of the city.

On February 8, it was reported that government forces were stationed at defense establishments and had set up checkpoints on the route to Khanasser, but rebel battalions controlled the streets of the city. Several parts of Safira continued to be bombarded by government forces, in an attempt to reclaim the city. Rebels from Al-Nusra Front and other jihadist groups surrounded the defense plant where many Army troops were stationed. Seven soldiers were killed when Al-Nusra fighters attacked a military checkpoint south of the defense plant. According to opposition activists, 112 rebels had been killed in the previous 72 hours. Much of the local population fled the city as a result of the violence. The opposition group SOHR reported that a convoy of Army reinforcements arrived at the factory after the fighting had ended. Later, it was reported that another convoy that was sent to the city was attacked by rebels and halted.

The stalemate in al-Safira continued for almost two weeks, with a war of attrition being waged between government troops still remaining in the city and rebel forces. However, on 19 February it was reported that, although unable to recapture the city, government reinforcements did manage to secure the road south of it and connect with troops at the plant, which had been under siege by rebels who could not capture it. The Army reinforcements further pushed north towards Aleppo, but were once again halted by rebels at the town of Tell Aran. By this point, rebel forces had lost more than 200 fighters while attempting to stop the Army reinforcements.

== Aftermath ==
In early March, government troops captured the last village on the road between Aleppo and al-Safira, re-establishing a land supply route between central Syria and Aleppo's airport. The Islamic rebels continued to attack the military factory. This effort to capture it eventually failed. It was reported by Xinhua on 13 October that the town was besieged by the government forces. On 1 November, government forces managed to recapture Safira.

== See also ==
- 2012 Hama offensive
- 2013 Latakia offensive
- Battle of Raqqa (2013)
