= Aleppo offensive (October–December 2013) =

2013 campaign during the Syrian civil war

Operation Northern Storm
- Part of the Battle of Aleppo and the Syrian Civil War
- Situation in Aleppo Governorate as of November 2013 Syrian Army control Opposition control
Date	1 October – 1 December 2013 (2 months)
Location	Aleppo Governorate, Syria
Result	Syrian government victory
Territorial changes	Syrian Army captures Khanasir, Al-Safira, Tell Aran, Tell Hassel, Base 80 and 20 smaller villages and towns and reopens the highway to Aleppo

Belligerents
Syrian Opposition; Free Syrian Army; Ahrar al-Sham; Nour al-Din al-Zenki Movement; Al-Nusra Front; Islamic State of Iraq and the Levant	(Syria) Syrian Government; Hezbollah

Commanders and leaders
Abdul Jabbar al-Oqaidi (Aleppo FSA commander, resigned in Nov.); Abdul Qader Saleh † (Al-Tawhid Brigade commander) Abou al-Tayyeb † (Al-Tawhid Brigade intelligence chief) Haji Bakr (ISIL leader)	Brig. Gen. Suhayl al-Hasan; Maj. Gen. Mahmoud Ramadan (35th Regiment)

Units involved
Free Syrian Army; Revolutionary Military Council in Aleppo; Al-Tawhid Brigade; Jaysh Mohammad Brigade	Syrian Armed Forces; Syrian Army: 3rd Army Corps (Aleppo); 15th Special Forces Division: 35th Special Forces Regiment; 127th Special Forces Regiment; 403rd Armored Regiment; National Defense Force; Hezbollah; Radwan force

Strength
Unknown	7,000 soldiers

Casualties and losses
125+ killed	105+ killed
- 97+ civilians killed

The October–December 2013 Aleppo offensive or Operation Northern Storm was a campaign during the Syrian civil war launched by the Syrian army in the Aleppo Governorate to reopen a key supply route linking central Syria to the largest city, Aleppo. The offensive began when the Syrian Army attacked the strategic town of Khanasir.

== Background ==
In June 2013, after their strategic capture of al-Qusayr, government forces launched an offensive called Northern Storm in Aleppo Province aimed at securing supply lines between disparate patches of control in the province. However, increased rebel pressure in Homs Province led the government to abandon the offensive and redeploy its troops there, leaving its supply lines to Aleppo city vulnerable to attack.

Later in the summer, rebels capitalised on this strategic weakness. In late July, rebels launched an offensive west of Aleppo city culminating in the capture of several suburbs and a massacre of captured government soldiers, and on 5 August, the long-besieged Menagh Airbase in the north of the province fell to the rebels. On 26 August, rebels captured the strategic town of Khanasir, thus cutting the government's last land supply route to the contested city of Aleppo.

Rebels then turned their sights to the government-controlled southern countryside of Aleppo. On 20 September, a coalition of at least ten rebel groups led by Ahrar ash-Sham and the Tawhid Brigade launched an offensive called wal-'Adiyat Dabha against government positions between the southern edge of the city and the defence factories outside of rebel-held Al-Safira. In the first six days of the offensive, rebels made significant advances, claiming to have captured at least 25 villages. In response, government forces from Aleppo International Airport redeployed south to counter the rebel offensive.

== The offensive ==
=== Capture of Khanasir and reopening of the highway ===
To reopen supply lines to Aleppo city, the government launched a counteroffensive along the so-called "Desert Road" between Aleppo and Salamiyah, dispatching a large convoy from the latter backed with heavy air support. Khanasir, captured by rebels in August, was the first major objective of the Army as it occupies a critical chokepoint on the road.

On 1 October, the shelling of Khanasir and fighting between the Army and rebels in the vicinity of the town killed at least 20 rebel fighters. The village of Jub al-Ghaws, near of Khanasir was bombed by helicopters while, according to SOHR, rebel fighters hit a fighter airplane above Khanasir.

On 2 October, according to SOHR, the Syrian Army progressed in Khanasir, taking control of parts of the city while a large number of rebel positions were hit by the Air Force in the province; al-Atareb, Khan al-A'sal, Kafrnaha and Minnegh military airport.

On 3 October, the Army took back control of Khanasir, with at least 25 rebel fighters and 18 pro-government militiamen being killed between 1 and 2 October. However, the military had not yet reopened the highway to Aleppo.

On 4 October, eight rebels were killed during fighting with the Army in the al-Hmeira mountain, near al-Safira.

On 7 October, the Army managed to reopen the supply route between Aleppo and Khanasir, capturing many surrounding villages like Rasm Okeiresh, Rasm al-Sheikh, Rasm al-Helou, Rasm Bakrou, al-Wawiyeh, Rasm al-Safa, Barzanieh, Jalagheem, Zarraa, and Kafar Akkad, breaking the siege of Aleppo. According to a governorate source, convoys carrying flour, food supplies, and fuel, went to Aleppo.

On 9 October, rebels massacred government soldiers in a village that had only just been captured by the Army. Elsewhere in the governorate, the Army took the control of other villages; Al-Hamam, Al-Qurbatiy and rebels retreating to Al-Qintein and Al-Bouz.

=== Capture of al-Safira and Tell Aran ===
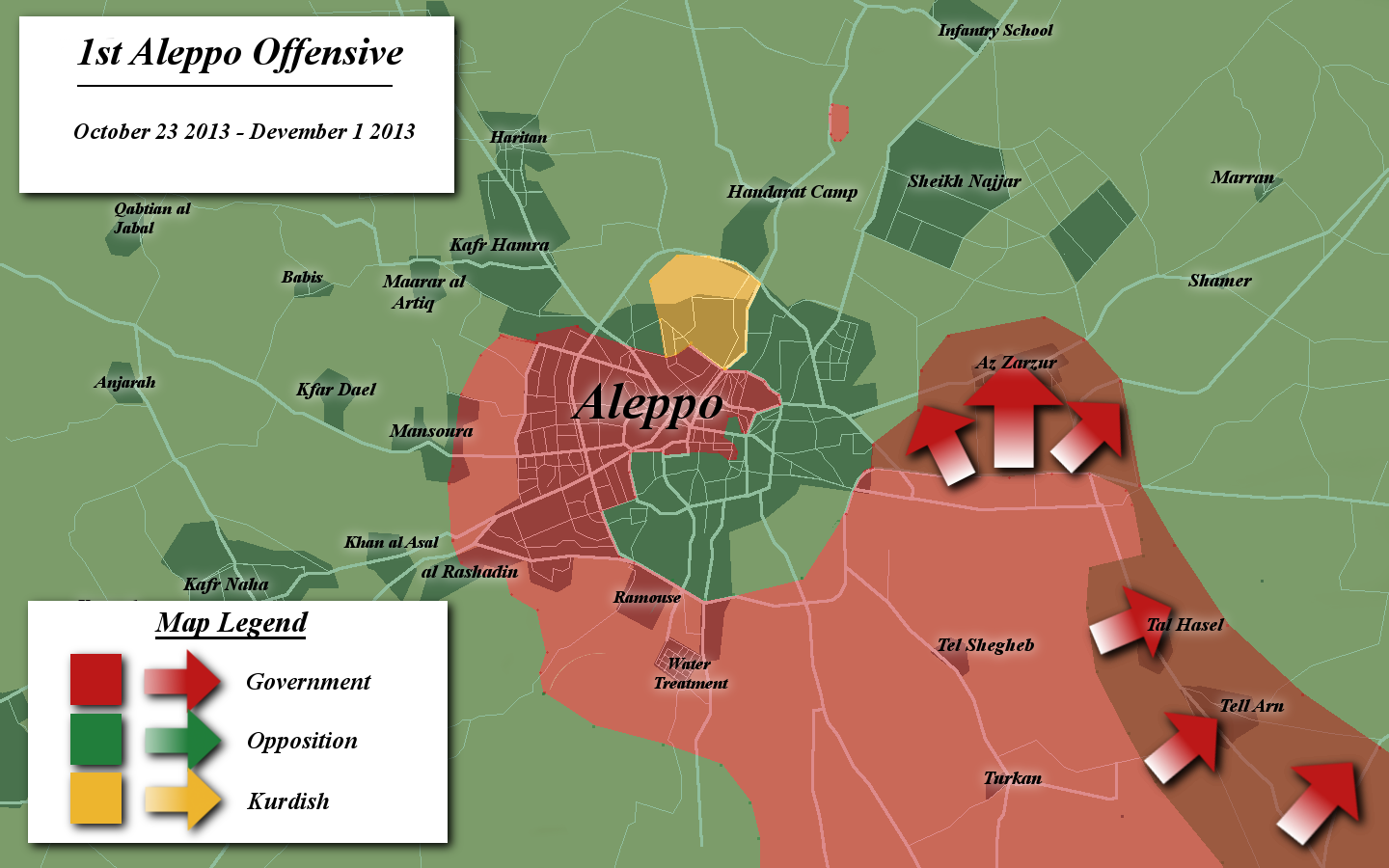
Situation in Aleppo city during the offensive

On 10 October, heavy Army shelling and airstrikes on the rebel-held town al-Safira killed 16-18 civilians. One of the areas that was hit was the town's market. According to one rebel, if opposition forces lost control of al-Safira everything they had accomplished over the previous year in Aleppo would be lost in a matter of days.

On 11 October, after clashes, the Army captured the village of Abu Jurayn, south of al-Safira.

On 17 and 18 October, heavy Army shelling of the rebel-held Kurdish town of Tell Aran left 21 civilians dead. 11 others were also injured. The town had been captured from Kurdish militants by jihadist rebels earlier in July.

From 8 to 25 October, 76 people had been killed by the shelling on al-Safira. More than 130,000 people fled the city.

On 30 October, the Syrian Army entered al-Safira and took over several buildings in the southern part of the city and also advanced on the eastern side the next day. By the morning of 1 November, the Army captured the town.

On 2 November, the Army, supported by Hezbollah officers, captured the village of Aziziyeh on the northern outskirts of Safira.

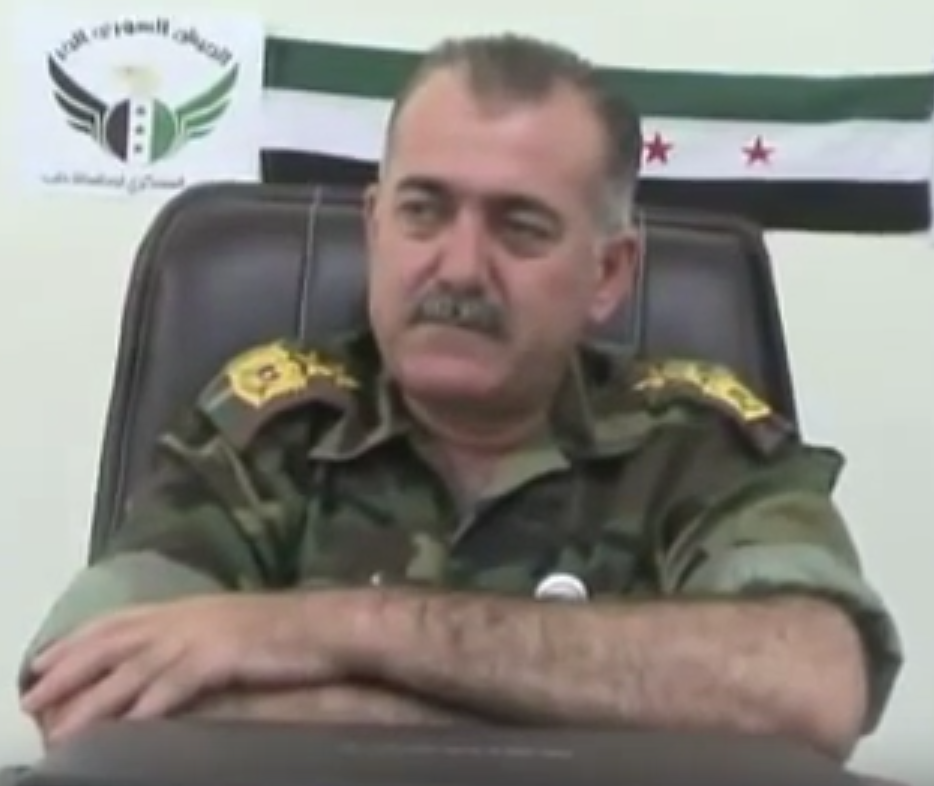
Abdul Jabbar al-Oqaidi, FSA top commander for Aleppo, resigned during the offensive in protest against the disunity among the rebel forces

On 4 November, following the loss of Al-Safira, the Free Syrian Army commander for the province of Aleppo, Abdul Jabbar al-Oqaidi, resigned.

On 6 November, the Army captured most of the Kurdish town of Tell Aran, forcing opposition fighters out of it. Some fighting was still occurring in Tell Aran as of 10 November, however, the Army secured the town by the next day.

=== Battle of Base 80 ===
On 8 November, before sunrise, the Syrian Army launched an attack against "Base 80", controlled by the rebels since February 2013, near the Aleppo airport. The Army, backed up by tanks and heavy artillery, unleashed "the heaviest barrage in more than a year" according to residents in Aleppo. A rebel fighter said, "We did not see it coming. The attack came as a real shock to us." According to Al-Jazeera, if the Army captured the base, it would cut the rebel supply routes between Aleppo city and the opposition-controlled town of al-Bab, about 30 kilometers from the Turkish border. By morning, the Army took over several areas of "Base 80", leaving them in control of large parts of it. Later in the afternoon, rebel forces, including ISIS, received reinforcements and regrouped, after which they attacked the base. During the fighting, two dozen air and artillery strikes struck rebel positions. After dark, rebels counter-attacked and by dawn the next day managed to recapture most of the base, with fighting still occurring around it. During the attack, rebels used GRAD rockets to strike the base.

On 10 November, fighting still continued around "Base 80", with reports of more fighting inside the base itself. During the clashes, rebels targeted two Army armored vehicles, while one rebel tank was destroyed, killing five rebel fighters. By the afternoon, the Army was once again in full control of the base. According to the SOHR, 63 rebels, including at least 11 foreign fighters, and 32 soldiers were killed during the battle. One other report put the number of rebels killed between 60 and 80. Army units were backed-up by Hezbollah fighters and pro-government militias during the assault.

By 11 November, the military had captured a series of nearby positions, securing most of the area around Aleppo International Airport.

=== Aleppo's eastern approach and attack on Tell Hassel ===
On 12 November, the Syrian Army had penetrated the town of al-Naqqarin in the eastern outskirts of Aleppo city, advancing further north. Opposition activists said the Army "launched a pincer movement from the north and the east and were closing in on major rebel held neighborhoods". At the same time, government forces inside the city, backed by tanks, had taken two highrise buildings in the northern Ashrafieh and Bani Zeid districts, and advanced into the two neighbourhoods after close-quarter street fighting.

On 13 November, Syrian Air Force helicopters dropped barrel bombs on rebel positions in Tell Hassel, south of Aleppo, while the military advanced toward the town and fighting raged near it.

On 14 November, an air strike killed the intelligence commander of the rebel Al-Tawhid Brigade and wounded the top leader of the unit, while they were meeting at a base in Aleppo. One other commander was also injured. That night, the leader of the Al-Tawhid Brigade, Abdulkader al-Saleh, died of his wounds in Turkey. However, his death was kept secret for four days until he could be buried.

On 15 November, the military captured Tell Hassel, with the rebels retreating to one of their strongholds near the town. By the end of the day, government forces secured the al-Safira road that connects Aleppo with the defence factories on the outskirts of al-Safira. The same day, a former Army colonel, who commanded another rebel brigade, was killed in fighting in the Maaret al-Artiq area, northwest of Aleppo city.

On 17 November, rebels blew up a bridge linking Tell Hassel and the cable, battery and tractor factories, which were still under rebel control, halting the military motorcade that was advancing towards the plants. Another military motorcade was reportedly advancing towards the rebel-held town of Bellat on the Aleppo-al-Bab highway. Later, government sources reported the Army managed to capture the factory area. According to local activists, opposition forces started to retreat from the village of al-Duwayrinah and the industrial area adjacent to Tell Hassel. The same day, a group of 15 ISIS rebel fighters conducted a raid into Tell Aran, which led to fighting that left 10 of the fighters dead as well as 18 government soldiers. The fate of the other five rebels remained unknown.

On 18 November, fighting still raged in al-Naqqarin, on the eastern edge of Aleppo, while on 19 November, the Army captured al-Duwayrinah.

By 24 November, it was reported that government forces started a push into the Sheikh Najjar industrial zone in the northeastern part of Aleppo.

On 30 November, Army helicopters targeted a rebel compound in al-Bab, but missed their target and hit a market, killing 26 people, including four children. The next day, the helicopters once again attacked the town, targeting a compound of the Tawhid Brigade, but missed their target and hit the Nafasin market instead, killing 24 people. Most of those killed in the second attack were civilians, but also included three rebel fighters. In both attacks, the helicopters dropped barrel bombs.

At the beginning of December, it was confirmed the Army captured al-Naqqarin and was advancing towards Tiyara. Meanwhile, rebels were retreating from the Sheikh Najjar industrial area, especially from the "Zone 3" buildings, after the military took control of Sheikh Yusuf hill, which overlooks Zone 3. On 1 December, Sama TV reported that the Army managed to capture the town of Tiyara, northeast of the al-Nairab air base, showing images of SAA soldiers inside the town.

=== Attempted rebel counter-attack ===
Fifteen government militiamen were killed during fighting with rebels near Base 80 on 21 November. A rebel commander was among the dead on the opposition's side. A few days later, rebels started a counter-attack in the area around Khanasir. By the next day, the rebels managed to capture several villages, but were not able to block the highway to prevent a further Army advance. Days later, the Army recaptured the six villages that rebel forces managed to seize. On 28 November, government and rebel forces clashed in the outskirts of Aziza, west of the airport, leaving 20 government fighters and 11 rebels dead.

== Aftermath ==
Soon after, the military launched operation Canopus Star, with the aim to encircle Aleppo and cut rebel supply lines into the city, thus besieging rebel-held areas.

Subsequently, the Army broke the siege of Aleppo's central prison on 22 May, and on 3 July, government forces fully captured the Sheikh Najjar industrial district.

== See also ==
- Battle of Aleppo (2012–2016)
- Battle of al-Qusayr (2013)
- Rif Dimashq offensive (September–November 2013)
