= Combat operations in 2016 during the Battle of Aleppo =

This is a chronological account of combat operations in 2016 during the Battle of Aleppo, part of the Syrian Civil War.

== February ==
On 22 February, Jund al-Aqsa captured the village of Rasm al-Nafal, to the southwest of Lake Jabbul, severing the Ithriyah-Khanasser Highway again for the second time in 5 months. Soon afterwards, the Syrian Army deployed reinforcements to the village from the town of Al-Safira, to recapture it and reopen the key supply route. By the next day, ISIL had also captured multiple villages along the southern shore of Lake Jabbul and to the south of Rasm al-Nafal, sealing off more of the Aleppo road. Although the Syrian Army managed to recapture a number of points on the highway, they were still unable to expel the Syrian rebel and ISIL forces from the vast majority of the villages that they had seized. ISIL forces also captured a point on the Sheikh Hilal-Ithriyah Road, shutting down that highway as well. Later on 23 February, it was reported that ISIL captured the strategic town of Khanasser, advancing further along the Ithriya-Khanasser Highway.

On 25 February, the Army launched a large-scale counterattack, dislodging ISIL from the town of Khanasir, which had been captured by the militants two days earlier. The counter-attack concluded 29 February 2016, when the Syrian Arab Army re-opened a supply route to Aleppo city.

== March ==
On 20 March, ISIL forces started an assault on the Sheikh Najjar Industrial District, capturing the villages of Kafr Saghir and Babinnis. By 22 March, however, the Syrian Army managed to repel the ISIL offensive and regain control over the two villages.

== June ==
See also 2016 Aleppo summer campaign (June–September 2016)

On 25 June, the Syrian army and allied forces began their long-awaited North-west Aleppo offensive. The ultimate goal of the offensive was to cut the Castello highway, which is the last supply route for rebels inside the city, thus fully encircling remaining opposition forces.

== July ==
See also 2016 Aleppo summer campaign (June–September 2016)

On 7 July, the Syrian Army imposed fire control over the Castello highway, as they advanced to within 1 km of the last rebel supply route into Eastern Aleppo, after capturing the Southern Mallah farms from the Al Nusra Front and other forces.

On 11 July, Jabhat al-Nusra launched an offensive inside Aleppo city capturing 10 buildings near the Al-Morour building (police station); however, this offensive was repelled and the SAA retook control of all lost buildings.

On 17 July, the Syrian Army reached and captured the Castello highway, tightening the blockade of the rebel-held eastern Aleppo.

On 27 July, the Army officially declared it had cut off all rebel supply routes into Aleppo.

Following the implementation of the siege, Syrian President Bashar Assad offered a general amnesty to militants who surrender to the government authorities in the next three months. Meanwhile, Russian Defense Minister, Sergei Shoigu, said that President Putin ordered a large-scale humanitarian operation outside Aleppo ”to help civilians who were taken hostage by terrorists as well as fighters who wanted to lay down the arms.” Shoigu also mentioned that three humanitarian corridors as well as food and first aid points will be offered outside the city. The rebels prevented residents from fleeing through humanitarian corridors, with only a few residents being able to leave encircled opposition-held districts. Pro-opposition sources claimed two young men were shot by Army snipers while they were trying to cross through the humanitarian crossings.

== August ==
See 2016 Aleppo summer campaign (June–September 2016)

== September ==
See 2016 Aleppo summer campaign (June–September 2016)

On 22 September, airstrikes were conducted on five districts of Aleppo. By the next day, due to the continues airstrikes, whole neighborhoods were in flames. Meanwhile, the Army made ground advances in the north and south of the city.

On 24 September, the airstrikes continued, while the Army advanced in the Handarat Camp district and near the Aleppo citadel. By the end of the day, government troops withdrew from the Handarat Camp. Om 25 September, government forces secured the Shaher district and launched a new assault on the Handarat Camp.

On 27 September, airstrikes hit two hospitals, while the Army captured the Farafira district.

On 28 September, government troops advanced in the al-Suweiqa district of Old Aleppo.

On 29 September, the Army took control of the Handarat Camp district and subsequently attacked the Kindi hospital, which had been made into a rebel base, as well as the nearby Shaqayf district.

On 30 September, government forces seized the Kindi hospital, while "back and forth" fighting took place in the central Suleiman Al-Halabi district.
