= Tell ad-Daman Nahiyah =

Tell ad-Daman Subdistrict ناحية تل الضمان
- Subdistrict
- Location of Tell ad-Daman Subdistrict within Aleppo Governorate
- Country: Syria
- Governorate: Aleppo
- District: Mount Simeon District
- Seat: Aleppo

Area
  - Total: 1,146.95 km^{2} (442.84 sq mi)

Population (2004)
  - Total: 47,501
  - Density: 41.415/km^{2} (107.26/sq mi)
- Geocode: SY020000

Tell ad-Daman Subdistrict (Arabic: ناحية تل الضمان, romanized: nāḥiyat Tal ad-Damān) is a subdistrict of Mount Simeon District in western Aleppo Governorate of northern Syria. It is located to the southeast of the city of Aleppo, in the Jabal al-Hass area.

According to the 2004 census, the subdistrict had a population of 47,501.
