= Al-Hajib =

Al-Hajib الحاجب
- Village
- Location in Syria
- Coordinates: 35°51′51″N 37°23′48″E
- Country: Syria
- Governorate: Aleppo
- District: As-Safira District
- Subdistrict: Al-Hajib

Population (2004)
  - Total: 10,408
- Time zone: UTC+2 (EET)
  - Summer (DST): UTC+3 (EEST)

Al-Hajib (Arabic: الحاجب, also spelled Al-Hajeb) is a town in the Aleppo Governorate in northern Syria, south of as-Safira. Nearby localities include Khanasser to the south. Al-Hajeb had a population of 10,408 in 2004.

Al-Hajib is the administrative seat of Al-Hajib nahiya.
