= Mount al-Hass =

Mountain in Syria

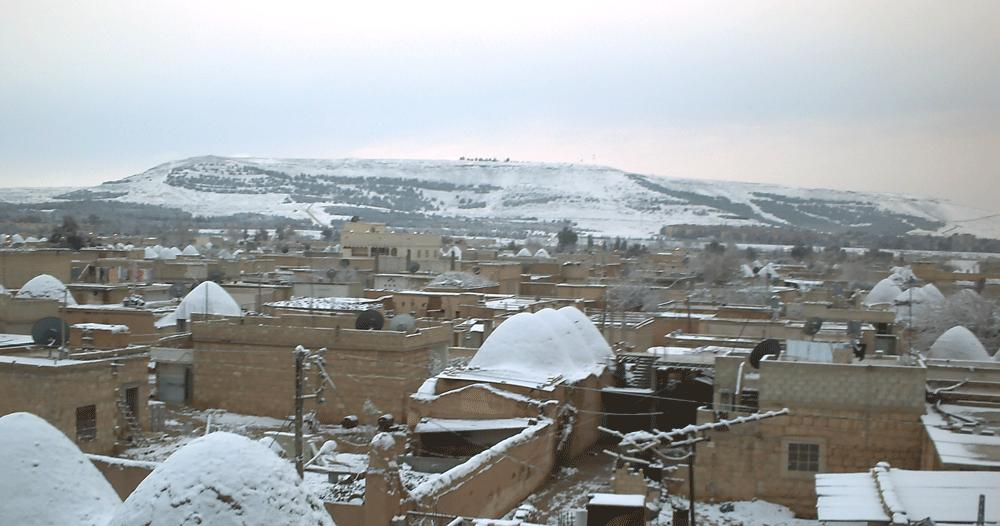
- View of Mount Ḥaṣṣ from Safīrah

Highest point
- Elevation: 638 m (2,093 ft)
- Coordinates: 35°58′12″N 37°18′42″E

Naming
- English translation: جبل الحص
- Language of name: ar

Geography
- Location within Syria
- Location: Aleppo Governorate, Syria

Mount Ḥaṣṣ or Mount Aḥaṣṣ (Arabic: جبل الحص or جبل الأحص; northern Syrian vernacular: ǧabal əl-Ḥəṣṣ) is a 500-metre-high plateau (maximum height 638 m) on the northern fringe of the Syrian Desert. It is located in the Safīrah District of Aleppo Governorate in Syria.

== Location and description ==
The plateau extends for 60 km (37 mi) with a width of about 30 km (19 mi) on the western side of Lake Jabboul from Safīrah in the north to Sabkhat Kharāyij (Arabic: سبخة الخرايج) and Sabkhat Ḥammām (Arabic: سبخة همام) in the south. To the east lie the Qinnasrīn plain (southern Aleppo plain) and the Maṭkh lowland. A lesser elevation called Mount Shabīth (Arabic: جبل شبيث) (highest point 360 m) is found in the southeast, beyond which lie Sabkhat Shabīth (Arabic: سبخة شبيث). The plain of Khunāṣir separates between Mount Ḥaṣṣ and Mount Shabīth.

The area has more than 150 villages inhabited by Bedouins or people of Bedouinic ancestry. It is one of the poorest regions in Syria. A development project aims to improve living standards.

An ancient fortress dating to classical antiquity has been recently uncovered on Mount Ḥaṣṣ.
