= Dutch involvement in the Syrian civil war =

This article discusses the Dutch involvement in the Syrian Civil War.

== Political alignment and international legal justifications ==
The Syrian National Council, a coalition of Syrian opposition groups founded in August 2011, is openly supported by the Government of Netherlands. In March 2012, the Dutch Minister of Foreign Affairs Rosenthal had a meeting in the Netherlands with representatives of the Syrian National Council. He emphasized that President Assad should step down and that the Syrian opposition should unite.

In 2014, this Syrian National Council refused to participate in the Geneva II Peace Conference on Syria because participating in those talks would go back on their stance of not entering negotiations until president al-Assad left office.

Apart from international legal justification for (Dutch) war actions against ISIL in Iraq (see Dutch war against ISIL), the Dutch mentioned that the United States had appealed to the right of collective self-defense to justify their US air attacks on ISIL in Syria to prevent an alleged immediately imminent armed attack from ISIL in Syria on Iraq. The Dutch government apparently tacitly consented to their ally the US thus extending their allied war on ISIL to Syrian territory.

All parties in the Dutch Parliament (150 seats), except two, supported this allied war in Iraq and Syria: the opposition came from the Socialist Party (15 seats) and the Party for the Animals (2 seats).

=== Motivation, purposes, strategy ===
The reasons for the Netherlands to join that American-led war on ISIL in both Iraq and Syria were:

1. ISIL's advance in Iraq and Syria, while displaying “unprecedented violence” and “perpetrating terrible crimes against population groups”, formed “a direct threat for that region”;
2. ISIL's advance in Iraq and Syria caused “instability at the borders of Europe” which threatened “our own [Dutch] safety”.

The purposes of that US-initiated war were according to the Dutch government:

- “stopping the advance of ISIL” in Syria and Iraq, where ISIL purportedly had conquered terrain in recent months, and
- “breaking the military force of ISIL”.

The strategy on Syrian territory was described by the Dutch government as coalition air attacks on ISIL.

== Military involvement ==
On 24 September 2014, the Government of the Netherlands decided to take part in “the military campaign” against ISIL (ISIS) which, as the Dutch claimed, had been started by the United States with the U.S. military operations in Iraq against ISIL (since 8 August 2014) and the U.S.-led military operations in Syria against ISIL (since 22 September 2014).

=== Support for Free Syrian Army ===
The government of the Netherlands designated €70 million to fund Syrian rebel groups fighting the government of Bashar al-Assad. It provided support to at least 22 rebel groups in Syria from 2015 to early 2018.

In an update to the official Dutch purposes and plans, sent to the Dutch Parliament on 15 December 2014, the purposes of their coalition war against ISIL were still as described in September 2014 to include military support to what they call “the moderate Syrian opposition”. The answers of the Dutch government given in February 2015 to Parliament made clear that, for the Dutch, "moderate Syrian opposition" meant only some (not all) groups that are part of the Free Syrian Army (FSA); for fear of “possible negative consequences” and because of “the sensitivity of revealing support to specific groups”, the government would not say which groups within FSA are being supported by the coalition.

While no new statements were made about legal justification for the military support to what they call “moderate Syrian opposition”, "stopping ISIL’s advance" or "breaking ISIL’s military force", that justification was still a presumed right of collective self-defense (see September 2014) to prevent an immediately imminent armed attack from ISIL in Syria on Iraq.

In June 2015, the Dutch decided to continue their participation in this allied war against ISIL in Syria and Iraq until October 2016.

On 29 January 2016, the Netherlands decided to “intensify” the Dutch contribution to the fight against ISIL in Iraq and Syria.

Militarily, this encompassed:

- air attacks in Syria on strategic ISIL targets on the supply lines of ISIL from eastern Syria into Iraq – but avoiding air attacks that would benefit the Syrian Assad government.

The air attacks would be performed by the same F-16 squadron already acting in Iraq (see Dutch war against ISIL).

This time the opposition in the Dutch Parliament (150 seats) was larger than it was in September 2014. Opposed to this intensification of the fight against ISIL were now the Socialist Party (15 seats), GroenLinks (green-left) (4 seats), Partij voor de Dieren (Party for the Animals) (2 seats), Group Kuzu/Öztürk (2 seats) and representative Norbert Klein.

In September 2018, the public prosecution department of the Netherlands declared a rebel group that it had previously supported, the Levant Front, to be a "criminal organisation of terrorist intent", describing it as a "salafist and jihadistic" group that "strives for the setting up of the caliphate".

Support for Jabhat al-Shamiya

According to a revelation came in a news report on Nieuwsuur, the government of the Netherlands gave “non-lethal assistance” (NLA) to 22 armed rebel groups which Dutch prosecutors had labeled a ‘terrorist’ organization. One of the groups has been identified as Jabhat al-Shamiya, which had been supplied with uniforms, vans and other equipment.
