= Tell Shughayb =

Tell Shughayb تل شغيب
- Village
- Location within Syria
- Coordinates: 36.1368923°N 37.2414111°E
- Country: Syria
- Governorate: Aleppo
- District: Mount Simeon
- Subdistrict: Mount Simeon

Population (2004)
  - Total: 5,110
- Time zone: UTC+3 (AST)

Tell Shughayb (Arabic: تل شغيب, also transliterated Tel Shegheb and Tel Shghaib) is a village in northern Syria, administratively part of the Mount Simeon District of Aleppo Governorate, located just southwest of Aleppo. Nearby localities include al-Nayrab to the north, Tell Hasil to the east and as-Safira to the southeast. According to the Syria Central Bureau of Statistics, Tell Shughayb had a population of 5,110 in the 2004 census.
