= Muharib al-Hamoud =

Syrian politician (born 1983)

- مهرب محمد الحمود

Member of the People's Assembly
- Incumbent
- Assumed office 1 July 2026
- Appointed by: Ahmed al-Sharaa

Personal details
- Born: 1983 Tell al-Daman, Syria

Muharib al-Hamoud (Arabic: مهرب محمد الحمود; born 1983) is a Syrian politician and tribal figure who has served as a member of the People's Assembly since July 2026.

== Biografy ==
He was born in Tell al-Daman in 1983. He is a member of Syrian Council of Tribes and Clans from the al-Bu Shaaban tribe.

Following the release of the Syrian presidential list, he became a member of the People's Assembly.
