= Ahmad Muhammad al-Hariri =

Syrian lawyer and politician (born 1978)

- الحريري محمد أحمد

Member of the People's Assembly
- Incumbent
- Assumed office 12 July 2026
- Constituency: Mount Simeon

Personal details
- Born: 1978 (age 47–48) Aleppo, Syria
- Party: Independent

Ahmad Muhammad al-Hariri (Arabic: الحريري محمد أحمد; born 1978) is a Syrian lawyer and politician who has served as a member of the People's Assembly for the constituency of Mount Simeon since October 2025. Before entering parliament, he was active in the Syrian revolutionary movement in Aleppo and held several positions in opposition legal institutions during the Syrian civil war.

== Biography ==
Al-Hariri was born in 1978 in the village of Fajdan, in the Mount al-Hass area of Aleppo Governorate, Syria. He studied law and subsequently practiced as a lawyer.

Following the outbreak of the Syrian revolution in 2011, al-Hariri participated in the revolutionary movement in Aleppo. He took part in demonstrations and sit-ins organized by lawyers and remained in opposition-held eastern Aleppo from the city's capture by opposition forces in July 2012 until its recapture by government forces in December 2016. After leaving Aleppo, he relocated to opposition-controlled northwestern Syria, where he continued his legal work. He served as a member of the Aleppo branch council of the Free Lawyers Syndicate and was elected head of the Aleppo Free Lawyers Authority for two consecutive terms.

Following the fall of the Assad regime, al-Hariri contested the 2025 Syrian parliamentary election in the Mount Simeon constituency and was elected to the People's Assembly in October 2025.
