= Al-Muslimiyah al-Shamaliyah =

Al-Muslimiyah al-Shamaliyah المسلمية الشمالية
- Village
- Location within Syria
- Coordinates: 36°19′53″N 37°12′40″E
- Country: Syria
- Governorate: Aleppo
- District: Mount Simeon
- Nahiyah: Mount Simeon

Population (2004 census)
  - Total: 2,690
- Time zone: UTC+3 (AST)

Al-Muslimiyah al-Shamaliyah (Arabic: المسلمية الشمالية) is a village in northern Syria, administratively part of the Mount Simeon District of the Aleppo Governorate. According to the Syria Central Bureau of Statistics (CBS), al-Muslimiyah al-Shamaliyah had a population of 2,690 in the 2004 census.
