= 2014 Al-Safira offensive =

Military operation launched by Syrian rebels

- Part of the Syrian Civil War
Date	8–12 October 2014 (4 days)
Location	Al-Safira, Aleppo Governorate, Syria
Result	Syrian Army victory
Territorial changes	The Army recaptures all villages by 12 October; Rebels initially capture seven villages near the Defense Factories

Belligerents
Islamic Front	(Syria) Syrian Arab Republic: Syrian Armed Forces; National Defense Force

Commanders and leaders
Abu Jaber (Ahrar ash-Sham leader)	Unknown

Units involved
Ahrar ash-Sham	Defense Factories garrison

Casualties and losses
Unknown	23+ killed 2 helicopters downed

The 2014 Al-Safira offensive, code-named "Zaeir al Ahrar” ("The Freemen Roar"), was a short-lived operation launched by Syrian rebels during the Syrian civil war in Aleppo Governorate, in an attempt to attack "three sites of the army which are al-Adnaneyyi, al-Zeraa al-Foqaneyyi and al-Ezraa al-Tahtatnia in order to open a road to attack the Defense Factories where helicopters take off in order to drop barrel bombs onto Aleppo, Idlib and Hama". The defense factories produced the barrel bombs that are dropped onto the city of Aleppo and its countryside.

== Rebel offensive ==
On 8 October, the rebel Ahrar ash-Sham announced the start of a battle called "Zaeir al Ahrar". That day, rebels of this group captured the villages of Qashotah, al Barzaneyyi, Diman, al Zera’ah al Tehtaneyyi and al Zera’ah al Foqaneyyi near the Defense Factories. At least 14 soldiers and 5 rebels were killed, while two helicopters were downed while trying to take off from the Defense Factories.

On 9 October, the Army claimed to have conducted a counterattack on rebel forces in Al-Barzaaniyya, Al-Zara’a, Bashkawi, Banaan Al-Hass, Kafr Akkar, and Al-‘Adnaniyya, resulting in the recapture of several of these villages. The Army also claimed that the rebels had refocused their offensive to the Khanasser countryside.

On 10 October, rebels captured the village of Abotbeh, leading to the death of 9 soldiers and losses among the rebels. This village is close to the town of Tal Abour, 2 km away from the Defense Factories. Rebels also captured the village of Sad’ayya overnight, before it was recaptured later that day.

== Army counter-attack ==
On 12 October, the Army launched a counter-attack and regained control over the villages that were captured by the rebels since 8 October.
