= Banan, Syria =

Banan بنان
- Town
- Location of Banan in Syria
- Coordinates: 35°58′00″N 37°18′00″E
- Country: Syria
- Governorate: Aleppo
- District: al-Safira
- Subdistrict: Banan
- Elevation: 508 m (1,667 ft)

Population (2004)
  - Total: 4,186
- Time zone: UTC+2 (EET)
  - Summer (DST): UTC+3 (EEST)

Banan (Arabic: بنان) is a town in the Aleppo Governorate. It is the administrative center of a nahiya with the same name, and part of the As-Safira District.

== Geography ==
The town is located to the southwest of the Sabkhat al-Jabbul, with an altitude of 508 meters. It is 23 km to the southeast of Aleppo, and 282 km from the capital Damascus.

== Population ==
According to the 2004 census, the population was 4186, including 2171 males and 2015 females.

== Transportation ==
The town was served by Aleppo International Airport.
