= Northern Storm =

Northern Storm may refer to:

- Northern Storm (rugby league team), New Zealand rugby league team
- Northern Storm Brigade, Syrian rebel group
- Operation Northern Storm, combat operation in 2013 Battle of Aleppo
