= Syrian National Resistance =

- المقاومة الوطنية السورية
- Flag of the Syrian National Resistance
- Leader: Rezan Hedo (political leader)
- Dates active: 6 September 2016 – 19 February 2017
- Group: Kafr Saghir Martyrs Brigade
- Headquarters: Tel Rifaat
- Active regions: Aleppo Governorate, Syria
- Ideology: Syrian nationalism Anti-Turkism; Democracy
- Wars: Syrian Civil War

The Syrian National Resistance (Arabic: المقاومة الوطنية السورية, romanized: al-Muqawama al-Wataniya al-Souriya) was an officially independent political coalition active in Aleppo Governorate and allied with both the Syrian Ba'athist government as well as the Syrian Democratic Forces. It was primarily fighting against the Turkish military intervention in Syria, although it was also opposed to various Islamist groups such as the Islamic State of Iraq and the Levant. The launch was announced on 6 September 2016 by Rezan Hedo, the head of the group’s political bureau. At that time Hedo was also an independent member of the Syrian Democratic Council.

== History ==
The emblem of the Kafr Saghir Martyrs Brigade, which uses the coat of arms of Syria as basis.

The Syrian National Resistance was officially founded on 6 September 2016 in the SDF-controlled town of Tell Rifaat, and by 12 September, the SNR already claimed to have set up offices in Aleppo, Idlib, Homs, Latakia, and other Syrian cities. On the other side, the Kafr Saghir Martyrs Brigade (Liwa Shuhada Kafr Saghir), which would eventually become the basis for the SNR's armed wing, emerged around late October when ISIL was driven from Kafr Saghir and the nearby Aleppo Infantry School north-east of Aleppo. The unit, which has been described as "a predominately Kurdish pro-government unit" and "officially neutral force for local protection between (the Syrian) regime and the SDF", was initially composed of around 50 volunteers and only lightly armed. The Kafr Saghir Martyrs Brigade joined the SNR sometime in November; later that month, the SNR entered the Battle of al-Bab together with the Syrian Army (SAA) to prevent Turkish-led rebel militias from conquering al-Bab.

On 19 February 2017, SNR leader Rezan Hedo announced the party was ceasing activities, citing lack of understanding between the Syrian government and the SDF.

== Ideology ==
The Syrian National Resistance was expressly Syrian nationalist and strongly opposed to the Turkish government, having accused Turkey of conducting a genocide against Syrian Arabs, Kurds, Armenians, Greeks, and Assyrians in Aleppo Governorate, attempting to conquer parts of Syria, and aiding terrorism. The SNR also expressed as one of its aims to retake Turkey's Hatay Province, which was annexed from Syria in 1939. Despite this, the group claimed it was unopposed to the Turkish people in general, and that it desired peaceful coexistence with the Turkish state in the long term. Furthermore, the SNR was strongly opposed to the Al-Nusra Front as well as the Islamic State of Iraq and the Levant, having declared its intention to drive them from Syria. The SNR followed a pan-ethnic brand of Syrian nationalism, and reportedly had Arab, Kurdish, Assyrian and Turkmen members; it wished to ensure Syria's future as united, integrated, and democratic state.

The Syrian National Resistance was allied both to the Syrian Armed Forces as well as the SDF, having been declared "a key player in improving regional relations between the SAA and Kurdish-led Syrian Democratic Forces (SDF)". Nevertheless, the SNR denied a direct affiliation to either faction. Rezan Hedo has stated that he counts on the support of both loyalists as well as opponents to the Ba'athist government, and that the SNR has "nothing to do" with the PYD, TEV-DEM, YPG, and PKK.

== See also ==
- List of armed groups in the Syrian Civil War
