= Mount Simeon Subdistrict =

Mount Simeon Subdistrict ناحية جبل سمعان
- Subdistrict
- Location of Mount Simeon Subdistrict within Aleppo Governorate
- Country: Syria
- Governorate: Aleppo
- District: Mount Simeon District
- Seat: Aleppo

Area
  - Total: 663.95 km^{2} (256.35 sq mi)

Population (2004)
  - Total: 2,181,061
  - Density: 3,285.0/km^{2} (8,508.1/sq mi)
- Geocode: SY020000

Mount Simeon Subdistrict (Arabic: ناحية جبل سمعان, romanized: nāḥiyah Jabal Sem‘ān) is a subdistrict of Mount Simeon District in western Aleppo Governorate of northern Syria. Administrative centre is the city of Aleppo.

According to the 2004 census, the subdistrict had a population of 2,181,061.

The cities and towns in the subdistrict are:

- Aleppo
- Abtin
- Assan
- Ayn al-Kabira
- Azzan
- Duwayr al-Zaytun
- Haddadin
- Hilan
- Hreibel
- Kafr Saghir
- Khan Tuman
- Maghayer Khan Tuman
- Maratat al-Muslimiyah
- al-Muslimiyah
- al-Muslimiyah al-Shamaliyah
- Qarras
- Rasm Assan
- Saqlaya
- Siefat
- Tell Shair Samaan
- Tell Shughayb
- al-Dhahabiyah
- al-Wadihi
