= Tell Aran =

Tell Aran تل عرن
- Town
- Location within Syria
- Coordinates: 36°7′23″N 37°20′13″E
- Country: Syria
- Governorate: Aleppo
- District: al-Safira
- Subdistrict: Tell Aran

Population (2004 census)
  - Total: 17,767
- Time zone: UTC+2 (EET)
  - Summer (DST): UTC+3 (EEST)

Tell Aran (Arabic: تل عرن; also spelled, Tell Arn; ancient Arne, Kurdish: Girê Aran) is a Kurdish-majority town in northern Syria, administratively part of the al-Safira District of the Aleppo Governorate, located southeast of Aleppo close to Sabkhat al-Jabbul. Nearby localities include Tell Hasel, al-Nayrab and Tell Shughayb to the northwest and al-Safira to the southeast. According to the Syria Central Bureau of Statistics (CBS), Tell Aran had a population of 17,767 in the 2004 census. The town is famous for its grapes, vineyards and gardens. The number of residents of Tell Aran has exceeded 60,000, after a large number of people were displaced from the city of Aleppo due to the civil war.

== History ==
=== Iron Age ===
==== Neo-Hittite/Aramean period ====
The archaeological mound is the largest tell in the Aleppo region and measures around 30 metres (98 ft) in height and 150 metres (490 ft) in width. It is believed to be the site of the ancient Iron Age settlement of Arne. Arne was first inhabited by the Arameans, and served as the first royal capital of the Aramaean kingdom of Bit Agusi. The kingdom of Bit Agusi stretched from the Azaz area in the north to Hamath in the south, and was established by Gus of Yahan in the 9th-century BCE.

=== Syrian Civil War ===
At the start of the war the young men and women of Tell Aran and neighboring Tell Hasel joined the ranks of the Kurdish Front Brigade to protect the area from theft and looting.

On 27 July 2013 both towns were at the center of attacks on Kurdish communities in northern Aleppo, carried out by the Islamic State of Iraq and Syria (ISIS) and Jabhat al-Nusra. The encircled defenders resisted for three days and suffered over 40-45 casualties, including many civilians. Following the massacre most people fled towards the Afrin Canton, which was controlled by the YPG. Pro-Kurdish media blamed the Turkish Intelligence Service for the attack, citing Turkey's fear of "[Kurdish forces] linking Afrin to Kobane". Jonathan Spyer of The Jerusalem Post commented on the events, saying: "The existence of small Kurdish enclaves within their desired area is an obvious irritant from the jihadis’ point of view. They are thus seeking to isolate and overrun all such points of Kurdish control. This is not yet a generalized challenge to the Kurdish-controlled area in the northeast; rather, it is an attempt at localized ethnic cleansing of a type familiar from other conflicts". Lawyer and eyewitness of the events Aladdin Kalo accused soldiers of the Assad-Regime of standing idle during the attack, even though a battalion called the "Tell Hasel Battalion" was located to the west of the towns.

In 2014, pro-Assad forces took control of the town and its surrounding areas with the participation of local youth. Following the takeover, a massive arrest spree ensued, leading to mental and physical torture, as well as the enforced disappearance of random victims. Kurdish youth were especially targeted.

In October 2015 another ISIS raid followed, which led to the death of at least four civilians including women and children. Media activist Nasser Tlajabini said that "the extremist group trie[d] to take revenge on the town’s residents [for the events of 2013]".

On 30 November 2024, the Kurdish-led Syrian Democratic Forces (SDF) took control of the city amidst the attack on Aleppo and the subsequent retreat of pro-government forces, to evacuate Kurdish civilians and IDPs from the Shahba Canton. Afterwards, militants affiliated with Hayat Tahrir al-Sham took over the city.

=== Syrian transitional government ===
During the rule of the Syrian Transitional Government (STG), multiple arrest campaigns targeted Kurdish men in the town and the nearby area of Tell Hasel. The charges often included “collaboration with the Autonomous Administration” and “listening to Kurdish national songs.” On 12 October 2025, government security forces attempted to arrest a young Kurdish man without presenting an official warrant or clear evidence. During the incident, the man’s father suffered a fatal heart attack. These practices have driven many young men to flee the area, with several reportedly migrating to Lebanon over the past few months.

== See also ==
- Tell Hasel

== Bibliography ==
- Bryce, Trevor (2009). The Routledge Handbook of The People and Places of Ancient Western Asia: The Near East from the Earky Bronze Age to the fall of the Persians Empire. Routledge. ISBN 9781134159086.
- Lipiński, Edward (2000). The Aramaeans: Their Ancient History, Culture, Religion. Peeters Publishers. ISBN 9789042908598.
- Le Strange, Guy (1890). Palestine Under the Moslems: A Description of Syria and the Holy Land from A.D. 650 to 1500. Alexander P. Watt for the Committee of the Palestine Exploration Fund.
