= Dutch military intervention against the Islamic State =

- Part of the War against the Islamic State
Date	24 September 2014 – 2 January 2019 (11 years, 10 months, 4 weeks and 1 day)
Location	Iraq, Syria
Status	Dutch victory

Belligerents
Netherlands	Islamic State

Commanders and leaders
(Netherlands) Mark Rutte (Prime Minister) (Netherlands) Jeanine Hennis-Plasschaert (Minister of Defence) (Netherlands) Frans Timmermans (Minister for Foreign Affairs) (Netherlands) Sander Schnitger (Lieutenant General) (Netherlands) Dennis Luyt (Lieutenant General)	(Islamic State) Abu Bakr al-Baghdadi (WIA) (Leader) (Islamic State) Abu Alaa Afri † (Deputy Leader of ISIL); Abu Mohammad al-Adnani † (Spokesperson); Abu Ayman al-Iraqi † (Head of Military Shura); Abu Suleiman † (Replacement Military Chief); Akram Qirbash † (Top ISIL judge); Abu Omar al-Shishani † (Chief commander in Syria); Abu Sayyaf † (Senior ISIL economic manager); Abu Khattab al-Kurdi † (Commander of the assault on Kobanî)

Units involved
Royal Netherlands Air Force	Military of the Islamic State

Strength
Netherlands: 6 F-16 Fighting Falcon fighters + 2 spare; 250 supporting troops; 130 trainers for the Iraqi Army; 2 Patriot missile batteries and 200 supporting troops in Turkey to defend its NATO ally against cross-border attacks.	ISIL: Around 100,000 fighters (according to Iraqi Kurdistan Chief of Staff.); At least a few hundred tanks 3 Drones

Casualties and losses
None	Unknown

The Dutch military intervention against the Islamic State began in 24 September 2014, the Dutch government decided to participate in the military campaign against ISIL (known as ISIS or IS in the Netherlands). According to NBCnews.com, the Netherlands did not feel legally justified to fight in Syria. The Royal Netherlands Air Force committed six F-16 fighter jets to the war effort. Operations concluded on 2 January 2019.

== Purpose and strategy ==
The Netherlands joined the war against ISIL because ISIL's advance in Iraq and Syria, displaying "unprecedented violence" and "perpetrating terrible crimes against population groups", posed "a direct threat to that region". ISIL's advance in Iraq and Syria "causes instability at the borders of Europe", which threatens "our own [Dutch] safety". The Dutch government, the US and its other partners (unspecified, except for France) would "stop ... the advance of ISIL" in Syria and Iraq and "break ... [its] military force". The Dutch would attack ISIL from the air in Syria and Iraq and provide air support for Iraqi and Iraqi-Kurdish ground forces. The Netherlands' contribution to that strategy would consist of six F-16 fighter jets for a maximum of one year, coordinated by the American Central Command (CENTCOM) and the Joint Forces Air Component Command in Kuwait.

== Legal basis ==
The Dutch government named the request for military support from the Iraqi government, presented to the United Nations on 25 June 2014 and repeated on 20 September, as its justification under international law for joining the war. It said that the United States had also appealed to the right of collective self-defense to justify US air attacks on ISIL in Syria to prevent an armed attack from ISIL in Syria on Iraq, and tacitly consented to the US action in Syria. All but two political parties in the Dutch Parliament (150 seats) supported the war, with the Socialist Party (15 seats) and the Party for the Animals (2 seats) opposing.

== Operation ==
=== October–November 2014 ===
Dutch F-16 fighter jets, executing air attacks on tactical locations of ISIL in Iraq since October 2014, are being coordinated by the American Central Command (CENTCOM) and the Joint Forces Air Component Command in Kuwait. The Dutch forces operate from Shaheed Mwaffaq Air Base in Jordan. The Dutch conduct an average of one or two sorties per day; by 17 November 2014, Dutch F-16s had dropped 75 bombs on ISIL targets in Iraq.

=== December 2014 ===
The first update to Dutch plans concerning the war against ISIL was a 15 December 2014 letter from the government to Parliament. The letter did not indicate whether ISIL's military force had been broken since September, providing only two bits of information on ISIL activity: "the Syrian moderate opposition" in Aleppo "suffered from ISIL activity" (without explanation), and in Kobanî ISIL was battling Syrian Kurds. No questions were asked by the Dutch Parliament if the September 2014 purposes had been achieved or approached.

As part of an international coalition now consisting of "more than 60 countries" which met on 3 December 2014 in Brussels, the Dutch aims remained as described in September: stopping ISIL's advance and breaking its military force. Its strategy had expanded to include unspecified military support of the moderate Syrian opposition. According to the government in February 2015, for Dutch purposes the "moderate Syrian opposition" meant some groups which were part of the Free Syrian Army (FSA). Dutch material support remained the same as in September: F-16 attacks in Iraq to destroy ISIL headquarters, storage depots, manufacturers of improvised explosive devices (IEDs), vehicles and troops. The country's legal justification remained the same.

=== June 2015 ===
In June 2015, the Netherlands decided to continue its participation in the allied war against ISIL until October 2016. As of that month, 575 Dutch airstrikes had been carried out in Iraq in 1,000 sorties over more than 475 missions.

=== January 2016 ===
On 29 January 2016, the Netherlands decided to intensify its contribution to the fight against ISIL with bombings in Syria. Militarily, this included supplying non-lethal support to the Iraqi forces and the Iraqi Peshmerga forces; arming the Peshmerga forces, and F-16 air attacks in Syria on strategic ISIL targets on ISIL supply lines from eastern Syria into Iraq (avoiding air attacks which would benefit the Syrian Assad government). Parliamentary opposition to the escalation from the Socialist Party (15 seats), GroenLinks (green-left) (4 seats), Partij voor de Dieren (Party for the Animals) (2 seats), Group Kuzu/Öztürk (2 seats) and representative Norbert Klein was larger than it had been in September 2014.

== End of mission ==
On 2 January 2019, four Dutch F16's returned to their base at Volkel Air Base after finishing their mission.

== Repatriation efforts ==
On 26 June 2020, the Supreme Court of the Netherlands ruled that the Netherlands was not legally obligated to repatriate 23 Dutch women that fled the country to join the Islamic State and were now held inside the Al-Hawl refugee camp in northeastern Syria. In its ruling, the Supreme Court maintained that since the women–and their 56 collective children–were not in Dutch territory, the Netherlands could not invoke human rights treaties it is a signatory to as a legal obligation. The court noted that since the women voluntarily traveled to the conflict zone, they could pose a national security threat if repatriated. The Dutch government also maintained that it was too dangerous to retrieve their citizens from the refugee camps in Rojava, despite the fact that at least 20 countries had done so since October 2019.
