= Muhammad Ramez Korej =

Syrian politician (born 1983)

Member of the People's Assembly
- Incumbent
- Assumed office 12 July 2026
- Constituency: Mount Simeon

Personal details
- Born: 1983 (age 42–43) Anadan, Syria

Muhammad Ramez Korej (Arabic: محمد رامز أحمد كورج; born 1983) is a Syrian politician who has served as member of the People's Assembly of Syria since 5 October 2025.

== Biography ==
He was born in Anadan, Aleppo Governorate, in 1983. Holds a Doctorate in Arts from Al-Azhar University. He worked as a lecturer at the Free University of Aleppo and held several positions, including Vice President for Administrative Affairs, Dean of the Faculty of Arts, Director of Free Aleppo Education, and Head of the Teacher Training Institute.
