= Bashar al-Hawi =

Syrian politician (born 1991)

Member of the People's Assembly
- Incumbent
- Assumed office 12 July 2026
- Constituency: Mount Simeon

Personal details
- Born: 1991 (age 34–35) Aleppo Governorate, Syria

Bashar Najm ad-Din al-Hawi (Arabic: الحاوي الدين نجم بشر; born 1991) is a Syrian politician who has served as member of the People's Assembly of Syria since 5 October 2025.
