= Kafr Saghir =

Kafr Saghir كفر صغير
- Town
- Location within Syria
- Coordinates: 36.292637°N 37.255899°E
- Country: Syria
- Governorate: Aleppo
- District: Mount Simeon
- Nahiyah: Mount Simeon

Population (2004 census)
  - Total: 3,130
- Time zone: UTC+3 (AST)

Kafr Saghir is a village in Mount Simeon Nahiyah of the Jabal Sem‘ān District.

Kafr Saghir (Arabic: كفر صغير, Kurdish: Kefêr Sixîrê, also written Kafr as Saghir, Kafr Şaghīr, Kafr as Safir or literally Little Kafr) is a village in northern Syria, administratively part of the Mount Simeon District of the Aleppo Governorate, just northwest of Aleppo. Nearby localities include Ratyan, Bayanoun and Mayer to the north, Anadan, Huraytan to the west, Kafr Hamrah to the south and Shaykh Najjar to the east.

According to the Syria Central Bureau of Statistics (CBS), Kafr Saghir had a population of 3,130 in the 2004 census. Kafr Saghir has a largely Kurdish population.

== Syrian civil war ==
During 2013 Kafr Saghir received in influx of Kurds from nearby Tell Aran and Tal Hasel.

On 3 July 2014 during Operation Canopus Star, the Syrian military with help from Republican Guards and Hezbollah captured Kafr Saghir from opposition forces.

After ISIL was driven from Kafr Saghir by the Syrian Armed Forces and the Syrian Democratic Forces, a new, local militia named the "Kafr Saghir Martyrs Brigade" was formed by the two to protect the area. This unit later joined the Syrian National Resistance.

=== Kafr Saghir massacre ===
On 20 March 2016, ISIL killed more than 20 Kurdish and Arab civilians in the eastern Aleppo town of Kafr Saghir. By 22 March, however, the Syrian Army managed to repel the ISIL offensive and regain control over the villages.

== See also ==
- Battle of al-Bab (2016)
