= Al-Zirbah =

Al-Zirbah الزربة
- Village
- Location in Syria
- Coordinates: 36°4′10″N 36°58′40″E
- Country: Syria
- Governorate: Aleppo
- District: Mount Simeon
- Subdistrict: al-Zirbah

Population (2004)
  - Total: 4,760
- Time zone: UTC+3 (AST)
- City Qrya Pcode: C1170

Al-Zirbah (Arabic: الزربة) is a Syrian village located in Mount Simeon District, Aleppo. According to the Syria Central Bureau of Statistics (CBS), Al-Zirbah had a population of 4,760 in the 2004 census.
