= Muhedi Issa =

Syrian lawyer and politician (born 1997)

- مهيد سيف الدين عيسى

Member of the People's Assembly
- Incumbent
- Assumed office 12 July 2026
- Constituency: Mount Simeon

Personal details
- Born: 1997 (age 28–29) Aleppo, Syria
- Party: Independent

Muhedi Issa (Arabic: مهيد سيف الدين عيسى; born 1997) is a Syrian lawyer and politician who has served as a member of the People's Assembly for the constituency of Mount Simeon since October 2025. Before entering parliament, he was active in the Syrian revolutionary movement in Aleppo and fought in many battles during the Syrian civil war.

== Biography ==
Born in Aleppo in 1997. He holds a law degree from Hasan Kalyoncu Üniversitesi in Gaziantep, Turkey.

He works as a lawyer and manager of companies specializing in the construction and oil trade.

After the Syrian revolution, he lost his father, Saif al-Din Issa, who was the commander of the "Turkmen Swords Battalion" and was killed in battles against regime forces on September 20, 2012.

He began his activity in the Syrian revolution in 2014, as he participated in several operations rooms and battles within the Sultan Murad Division faction.

Following the fall of the Assad regime, Issa contested the 2025 Syrian parliamentary election in the Mount Simeon constituency and was elected to the People's Assembly in October 2025.
