= Zammar =

Zammar زمار
- Village
- Location in Syria
- Coordinates: 35°53′34″N 36°58′59″E
- Country: Syria
- Governorate: Aleppo
- District: Mount Simeon
- Subdistrict: Zammar

Population (2004)
  - Total: 1,919
- Time zone: UTC+3 (AST)
- City Qrya Pcode: C1156

Zammar (Arabic: زمار) is a Syrian village located in Mount Simeon District, Aleppo. According to the Syria Central Bureau of Statistics (CBS), Zammar had a population of 1,919 in the 2004 census. Zammar was previously part of al-Zirbah Subdistrict until 2009, it later became a subdistrict itself.
