= Arif Razzuq =

Syrian physician and politician

- عارف رزوق

Member of the People's Assembly
- Incumbent
- Assumed office 12 July 2026
- Constituency: Mount Simeon

Personal details
- Born: Turmanin, Syria
- Party: Independent
- Education: University of Aleppo (MBBS)

Arif Razzuq (Arabic: عارف رزوق) is a Syrian physician, humanitarian and politician who has served as a member of the People's Assembly for the constituency of Mount Simeon since October 2025. Before entering parliament, he worked as an otolaryngologist in opposition-held areas of Aleppo during the Syrian civil war, served as president of the Aleppo Medical Council, and became Executive Director of the humanitarian organization Shafak in 2016.

== Biography ==
Razzuq was born in the town of Turmanin, in Idlib Governorate. His father was reportedly killed by Syrian government forces during the unrest of the early 1980s. He studied medicine at the University of Aleppo, graduating with a degree in human medicine before undertaking postgraduate specialization in otolaryngology. He later obtained a master's qualification in the specialty from the al-Razi Hospital, affiliated with the Syrian Ministry of Health.

Following the outbreak of the Syrian revolution in 2011 and the subsequent civil war, Razzuq became active in the medical sector in opposition-controlled areas of northern Syria. Between 2012 and 2016, he worked as a surgeon and physician in field hospitals in Aleppo, providing medical care during the siege and bombardment of opposition-held districts of the city. During this period he also served as president of the Aleppo Medical Council, one of the principal professional bodies coordinating healthcare provision in opposition-administered areas of Aleppo and its countryside.

In 2016, Razzuq became Executive Director of Shafak, a humanitarian and development organization operating in Syria and neighboring countries. Under his leadership, the organization expanded its activities in health services, education, psychosocial support, disability services and humanitarian relief programs in communities affected by the conflict.

Following the fall of the Assad regime in December 2024, Razzuq stood as a candidate in the parliamentary elections to the People's Assembly. He was elected in October 2025 as a representative for the Mount Simeon constituency in Aleppo Governorate.
