= Combat operations in 2014 during the Battle of Aleppo =

== Operation Canopus Star starts ==
In early December 2013, the Syrian Army launched operation Canopus Star with the aim to encircle Aleppo and cut rebel supply lines into the city, thus besieging rebel-held areas.

Between 15 and 28 December 2013, a series of Army helicopter attacks with barrel bombs against rebel-held areas of Aleppo left 517 people dead, including 151 children, 46 women and 46 rebels, according to the SOHR. A rebel commander claimed that by 26 December, more than 1,000 people had been killed in the bombing campaign. On 9 January, aid groups stated more than 700 people had been killed since the start of the bombing campaign.

On 20 December, Islamist rebels, including members of the Al-Nusra Front, took control over the Kindi hospital, which had been used by government soldiers as a base for several months. Reuters photojournalist Molhem Barakat was killed during the action. At least 20 regular soldiers were killed and dozens were taken prisoner in the fighting which began after two Al-Nusra fighters detonated themselves at checkpoints guarding the hospital. A few days later, government forces stormed and recaptured much of the Bani Zeid neighborhood on the northeastern outskirts of the city.

On 25 December, pro-government sources claimed that the Syrian Army captured the al-Sheikh Maqsoud and al-Jbanat areas of Aleppo city.

On 8 January 2014, Islamist rebel forces loyal to the National Coalition attacked the ISIS headquarters at a hospital in the Qadi Askar district of Aleppo. Reports indicate that the rebels were successful in capturing the base, freeing dozens of rebel and civilian prisoners while also recovering the bodies of dozens of people who appeared to have been executed. Elsewhere, over 100 ISIS forces reportedly surrendered in Aleppo's Saliheen district. By the end of 6 January, the death toll in the bombings had risen to 603, including 172 children, 54 women and 54 rebels.

On 9 January, it was reported that all ISIS forces were driven out of Aleppo city by the rebels.

On 11 January 2014, government forces secured the area of Al-Naqqarin and Sheikh Yusuf hill and were advancing towards the industrial area of Aleppo city. According to opposition activists, the rebels were in fear of losing the industrial district, which would cut their supply lines from Turkey. The next day, the Army also advanced towards the highway linking the airport to the government-held western part of the city.

On 14 January, the Army reportedly captured Al-Zarzour, Al-Taaneh, Al-Subeihieh and Height 53 on the eastern outskirts of Aleppo. On 15 January, an Al-Manar correspondent reported that the Army captured Al-Sabaheyya, al-Faory and Tal-Riman, east of Al-Safira, and was pushing towards the electricity station, northeast of Al-Safira. Later, Al-Manar claimed that the Army captured Tell Alam and Huwejna, east of Aleppo, also on the approaches to the electricity station. At the same time, government troops pushed out of Kweires military airport, east of Aleppo and the station, and captured villages around the base.

On 16 January, the Army made slow progress in the neighborhood of Bani Zeid, while the rebels captured two buildings in the Saif Al-Dawla district.

On 17 January, the Army bombarded the villages of Tal-Na'am, Jobul and Tal-Estabel and captured the village of Tal-Sobeha. By 18 January, it was confirmed government troops captured the town of Tall Alam, just west of the power plant. Sheikh Zayat, on the southern outskirts of the industrial zone, was also captured.

On 25 January, the Army captured the neighborhood of Karam Al-Qasr on the eastern side of Aleppo city, after three days of fighting.

On 27 January, fighting was renewed in the area of the Umayyad Mosque in Aleppo's Old City, as the rebels claimed of destroying a Hezbollah base at Mount Hoihna and capturing most of the buildings in the town Maarath Al-Artik, on Aleppo's northwest outskirts.

On 28 January, rebels captured the Maarath Al-Artik mountain, which the Army used to shell nearby rebel-held towns. On the same day, the Army made more advances and seized the districts of Ballura and Kasr al-Tarrab, according to the pro-government al-Watan newspaper. It too said that an operation had been launched from Nairab airport in the east, as well as Aziza village in the south, while adding that troops had reached the outskirts of Mayssar, a rebel bastion in southeast Aleppo. At the same time, the SOHR confirmed the military captured the Karm al-Qasr district, on the southeastern edge of Aleppo, and reported that residents of Mayssar, Marjeh and Enzarrat districts were fleeing their homes for "neighbourhoods controlled by regime forces because of the fighting".

On 2 February, the pro-government Al-Watan newspaper announced that the Army captured most of the eastern Karam al-Turab district of Aleppo.

On 7 February, the Islamist brigade Ahrar ash-Sham and al-Nusra Front took near-full control of Aleppo Central Prison, storming the center after a British suicide bomber named Abu Suleiman al-Britani detonated a car bomb at the entrance. Rebels also claimed to have freed hundreds of detainees, many of them activists, from the prison, which reportedly held 3,000 prisoners in dire conditions. Government sources claimed that soldiers inside of the prison destroyed the suicide bomber's truck with RPGs before he reached the entrance. The next day, the Army recaptured most of the prison. At least 47 people died in the fighting, including the Al-Nusra commander of the Aleppo prison operation: Sayfullah al-Shishani.

On 16 February, government forces captured the village of Sheikh Najjar, south of the industrial zone, as well as Talet al-Ghali, on the eastern outskirts of Aleppo.

On 17 February, the Tawhid Brigade of the Islamic Front launched Operation 'Earthquake' and detonated mines under the Army headquarters at the Carlton Hotel, leaving parts of the hotel damaged. Opposition sources also claimed that rebels captured strategic points around the Aleppo citadel.

On 19 February, rebels claimed to have recaptured Sheikh Najjar, while, the SOHR stated it was unclear who controlled the area. The next day, the Army re-secured Sheikh Najjar and captured two strategic hills that overlook the eastern neighborhoods of Aleppo, al-Ghalia and Syriatel. It was also reported that rebels detonated mines under an army headquarters near the Aleppo citadel. This was the third such attack this month using a network of tunnels.

On 24 February, the Army made progress in the Sheikh Najjar industrial zone, with rebels sending reinforcements to the area. The military was attempting to capture strategic areas in Sheikh Najjar that overlook the outskirts of the Aleppo central prison, which had been under a rebel siege for over a year. The Army hoped to station artillery at those positions to help fend off attacks on the prison. The next day, the military captured the factory of the Zanoubia ceramic company in the southern al-Sheikh Sa'id district of Aleppo. Soldiers, NDF militiamen and Hezbollah fighters also captured new positions near Base 80, putting them one kilometer from the Tariq al-Bab district.

By 9 March, government forces had captured a strategic hill, where they positioned artillery to bombard rebel positions around the prison. The Army had also reportedly captured the eastern Hanano district of Aleppo city and was planning to open a new road that would link Hanano and the industrial zone, after it is captured, thus imposing a blockade on the city.

On 18 March, rebels detonated an "explosive device" in a tunnel under the Justice Palace. The rebels claimed to have seized the old Justice Palace after the blast.

== Offensives and counter-offensives ==
On 23 March 2014, rebels captured Kafr Hamra, the Shweihneh strategic hill overlooking west Aleppo and briefly cut off the supply route to Aleppo airport before government troops found another supply route. Rebels also captured the police station on the edge of the citadel, as well as military installations in the Al-Layramoun district.

On 28 March, it was reported that a Syrian brigadier general of the Republican Guard and five of its soldiers were killed in the Al-Layramoun district.

On 9 April, it was reported that the Syria's Red Crescent and the UN refugee agency had delivered aid to rebel-held areas of Aleppo city for the first time in 10 months.

On 10 April, rebels took the technical services building and the al-Khadamat al-Faniya building near the air force intelligence building, but pro-government sources denied that the rebels were advancing in western Aleppo. It was also reported that the Army was trying to regain control over the rebel controlled A’qrab area.

On 12 April, rebels reportedly stormed the government held Ramouseh industrial district, in an attempt to cut the Army supply route between the airport and a large Army base next to district. The rebels also reportedly took the Rashidin neighbourhood and parts of the Jamiat al-Zahra district, while rare clashes between the Army and YPG took place in the al-Sheikh Maqsoud area. The SOHR stated that there had been casualties on both sides and civilians had fled the area.

On 15 April, rebels took the Sadkop area and the police station in the Ramouseh district, but the Army managed to recapture lost ground in the district later that day. At least seven pro-government fighters were killed in the district, while 18 rebels were reportedly killed that day in and around Aleppo city.

On 17 April, the rebels detonated "explosive devices" underneath Army positions around the Hanano Barracks, before attacking it. State Media claimed the attack was repelled, while opposition activists claimed the rebels were advancing. The SOHR stated that at least 27 regular troops and 20 rebels, including a commander, were killed in the fighting. The SOHR also claimed that rebels had seized buildings near the Air Force Intelligence building.

On 18 April, it was reported that 25 civilians were killed and more than 100 wounded by rebel bombardments on government-held areas in western Aleppo the day before. The SOHR also stated that an Army officer was killed during clashes in the Ramouseh district.

On 19 April, the Army reportedly regained ground around the perimeter of the air intelligence building and al-Leirmoun area, while it was also claimed that the rebels captured two checkpoints on the outskirts of al-Aziza. Meanwhile, rebels claimed to have captured the village of Fajdan in southern Aleppo.

On 25 April, the Al-Sham operation room and YPG signed a truce in Aleppo city. On this date an opposition imposed power blackout on government held neighborhoods in Aleppo reached a second week.

On 26 April, according to the SOHR, rebels advanced on the perimeter of the al-Zahra artillery base, while the Army advanced in the al-Matahen area east of Az Zarzur. At least 13 soldiers and five rebels were reportedly killed in the clashes at the al-Zahra artillery base and the al-Maliya square. It was also claimed that an Army tank was disabled in that area. Later that day, the Army managed to push further east of Aleppo by capturing the village of Shamir after heavy clashes with the ISIS. Meanwhile, rebels reportedly advanced towards the new Palace of Justice and took control of parts of it.

On 27 April, it was reported that rebels blew up the Chamber of Commerce in Old Aleppo, which was being used as Army headquarters. At the same time, at least 70 civilians were reported killed and wounded by rebel shelling on government-held areas of Aleppo. Opposition sources claimed that at least 10 rebels and 14 pro-government fighters, including the Director of the Office of the Chief of the Air Force Intelligence in Aleppo, were killed in clashes around the new Palace of Justice and the Airforce intelligence building. It was also reported that the rebels announced the start of a new military operation in Shekh Najjar, Aziza suburb, Sheikh Said district and Old Aleppo.

On 28 April, rebels and the Syrian government reached a deal in Aleppo and electricity was returned in western Aleppo, after the rebels cut it for ten days, in exchange for a cessation of airstrikes by the Army. This agreement appeared to be holding on 30 April, despite minor violations. However, it was later reported that the Syrian Airforce bombed The Ein Jalout school and killed at least 20 people, including 17 children. By the end of the day, electricity to western Aleppo was completely cut off again.

On 29 April, the Army managed to consolidate its control over al-Ramouseh district. It also recovered the mills area and advanced towards the neighborhood of al-Sheikh Saeed.

On 30 April, the rebels retook the Dawar al-breij area after it was taken by the Army earlier that day. Meanwhile, two suicide-bombers detonated themselves on the al-Zarzour hill and the al-Sheikh Yusuf hill. The blasts resulted in the destruction of several "machineries and vehicles". It was also reported that three other suicide-bombers detonated themselves at checkpoints near al-Sheikh Yusuf, al-Zarzour and al-Mayyas hills, amid rebel advances in the area. Rebels claimed that dozens of pro-government fighters were killed and wounded in the clashes. Al Jazeera reported that four tanks were disabled by rebels at the al-Sheikh Yusuf hill.

On 1 May, rebels reportedly captured the orphanage near the airforce intelligence building, while the Army regained control over the al-Breij roundabout after it was lost to the rebels the day before. The next day, government forces captured the Al-Majbal area, thus taking control of the northeastern entrance to Aleppo. This also brought government forces close to the central prison.

On 4 May, the Army was engaged in heavy fighting while it was trying to push from the Breij Roundabout towards the besieged Aleppo central prison.

On 5 May, rebels reportedly managed to retake several points in Bureij, amid the arrival of hundreds of rebel reinforcements from Idlib, Hama and Aleppo provinces. According to the SOHR, 21 rebel fighters and 30 pro-government fighters were killed in the clashes, in addition to 3 disabled Army tanks. Other opposition sources denied the report saying rebel forces had made no progress in the Bureij area. Four days later, according to the SOHR, rebels managed to retake the al-Majbal area at the cost of at least 27 fighters, while the Army suffered several casualties. As of 14 May, fighting was still ongoing in the vicinity of Bureij.

On 8 May, the remains of the Carlton Citadel Hotel and a number of buildings near it were leveled by a 'tunnel-bomb', resulting in casualties among the Army ranks. The hotel was used as a military base. According to the SOHR, at least 14 pro-government fighters were killed in the blast, while rebels claimed to have killed 50.

== Prison siege broken and Sheikh Najjar captured ==
On 20 May, the Army captured the Sheikh Najjar power plant and Agop hill right next to it, which opened the way towards the central prison, bringing government troops to one kilometer from the prison complex. There were also reports that some troops had already arrived to reinforce the prison. After the capture of the hill, the military attacked the village of Hilan, which is the last rebel stronghold before the prison. The Army was also still engaged in Sector 2 of the industrial complex.

The next day, the military captured Hilan, as government forces had broken through on the road leading to the prison. At the same time, rebels blew up the Kindi hospital in fear it could be used for monitoring rebel supply routes if the advancing government troops managed to capture it. Soon after, Army tanks had reached and taken up positions at about 500 meters from the prison complex. The area was witnessing heavy artillery shelling, with government troops dropping at least 30 barrel bombs from military helicopters over the previous 24 hours, as rebel forces were fast retreating from the area due to the government's superior firepower. During the two days of fighting, at least 50 rebels were killed.

On 22 May, the Army had finally broken the siege of the prison as tanks and armored vehicles entered the complex. The Air Force dropped more than 100 barrel bombs during the final push to reach the prison. This puts the north-east approach to Aleppo under the control of government forces. At this point, for the first time, an Army reconnaissance squad entered one of the streets of the eastern Masakin Hanano district.

By 25 May, the military was in control of most of the industrial zone 16 kilometers (9.9 mi) north east of Aleppo, except a northern section, and had captured the town of Jbeileh next to the prison. By 8 June, the army had completely secured the industrial city which had been organized as a fortress by the rebels, who planted mines and dig dozens of tunnels in the area. It was reported that hundreds of rebels blew themselves up rather than surrendering.

On 31 May, a number of buildings near the market Zahrawi in old Aleppo were damaged by a 'tunnel-bomb' according to a YouTube video uploaded by the Islamic Front. The rebels alleged the attack had resulted in casualties among the Army ranks. The SOHR claimed at least 20 soldiers were killed in the blast, while Islamic Front claimed to have killed 40.

On 4 July, the Army took control of the Sheykh Najjar industrial area and two days later captured the town of Kafr Saghir northeast of Aleppo, bringing the distance between Army-held areas and the rebel-held Infantry School to just one town. With this, the rebel's situation deteriorated as the Army was close to severing all supply routes to opposition-held districts of Aleppo.

== Rebel counter-attacks repelled, continued Army advance ==
On 29 July, at least 13 Syrian Army personnel were killed by two tunnel-bombs under a police station building near Aleppo Citadel.

By mid-August, only three miles remained before the military could completely cut rebel supply lines into the city, after the opposition forces’ position deteriorated in the previous month following failed rebel counterattacks that attempted to dislodge government troops from the industrial zone. The rebels also attempted to capture the military academy in the western outskirts of the city, in an attempt to force government forces to reposition from the east to the west. However, the attack ended in catastrophe after the rebels were exposed to repeated air strikes, even at night, that made it impossible to move men and weapons freely.

Government forces had also captured two hills and three villages in the western Aleppo countryside, while there were competing claims over the town of Khan Tuman. On 18 August, the Army captured Khan Tuman hill.

== Renewed Army offensive north of the city ==
On 3 October, the Syrian Army, backed by NDF fighters, captured the town of Handaraat and Handaraat Hill, thus placing the rebel-held districts of Aleppo under siege.

On 9 October, the Army claimed to have captured the Handarat farms and the village of Babinnis, just south of the rebel-controlled infantry school.

On 11 October, rebels advanced in the neighborhood of al-Rashedin where they took control over some buildings. Two days later, they also advanced in Suleiman al-Halabi area near Hanano Barracks and in the village of Saifat. On 13 October, according to the SOHR, rebels made advances that could possibly cut off the supply roads to the Army-held Sifat, Handarat and Handarat base.

On 18 October, the Army captured the village of al-Jbayleh and the cement plant, north of the Central Prison of Aleppo, ending the rebel's attempts to isolate the Army in Sifat and Handarat. They also captured the Aleppo Glass Factory and the next day seized the village of Al-Muslimiyya.

On 9 November, an UN envoy arrived in Syria to tour camps and lay out a ceasefire proposal for Aleppo. The proposal reportedly included the districts of Hanano, Bani Zaid, Salahaddine, Al-Ramouseh, Handarat, Sheikh Saeed and Al-Layramoun where the Syrian Army and the Islamic front would adhere to a ceasefire. The latter would then disarm and be safely transported to the Syrian-Turkish border. The ceasefire proposal was rejected by rebels by 13 November 2014 though.

On 17 November, according to a Turkish media source, Jamal Marouf, the leader of the FSA in Aleppo, fled to Turkey, withdrawing with him over 14,000 Opposition troops. As a result, the FSA lost control over the Bab al-Hawa border gate with Turkey, which is now under Ahrar al-Sham control.

On 24 November, according to Almasdar the SAA's entry in east Aleppo was coupled with their success at the Al-Jandoul Roundabout, where the latter forced the Islamic Front to retreat from the main road connecting the Al-Jandoul Roundabout and Al-‘Aweeja. The success at the Al-Jandoul Roundabout led to the SAA's entry into east Aleppo and if the latter captures the Hanano District; it will disrupt the Islamic Front's supply route into the east. The army had also checked an attempt by the al-Nusra Front to enter the villages of Nubl and az-Zahra. The Nusra Front lost at least 179 militants between 23 and 28 November. By the end of November, the Army had established control over 80% of al-Oweija, parts of Hanano and most of Handarat.

On 7 December, the army secured a fresh advance, taking the area of Breij northeast of the city of Aleppo and killing at least 24 rebels and jihadis. The next day, the army advanced around Handarat and managed to control al-Breij, al-Hajal, al-Majbal districts in Aleppo with overlooking on Hanano, Haydariya and Duwayr al-Jandul.

On 9 December, SAA, Ba’ath Brigades and NDF entered the Al-‘Oweeja and Baya’adeen districts.

On 11 December, the Syrian Arab Army (SAA) – backed by the National Defense Forces (NDF) and Al-Ba’ath Brigades (Liwaa Al-Ba’ath) – stormed the Stone Quarries in southern Al-Bureijj, killing a number of militants from the Islamic Front (Jabhat Al-Islamiyya) and retaking ground captured by the latter in the previous week. The SAA and its allies were able to fight past the Stone Quarries and continue their push south towards the strategic Hanano District in Aleppo. The Islamic Front suffered significant casualties at Al-Bureijj over the previous seven days, estimated at more than 60 killed. In Al-Amariya, the NDF detonated explosives under a building housing some 40 Ahrar ash-Sham militants, possibly killing dozens.

On 13 December, the Britain-based Syrian Observatory for Human Rights said the hell cannon, a mortar-like improvised weapon used by the opposition, has killed over 300 civilians with most of them in Aleppo.

On 14 December, the Army advanced into and captured the al-Mallah area, with further attempts by the military to capture the area west of al-Mallah and thus finally cut the Castello Road. Government forces also advanced and captured the southern and western parts of the Handarat city district, closing in on Handarat hill which overlooks the Castello Road. 34 rebels and nine soldiers were killed during the day.

On 26 December Syrian Air Force planes and helicopters dropped multiple barrel bombs north-east of Aleppo killing 40 people.

On 30 December a tunnel bomb by new opposition group Jabha Shamiyeh in the Old City killed and wounded 20 government soldiers.
