= Abdul Jabbar al-Oqaidi =

Officer in the Free Syrian Army

- عبد الجبار العكيدي
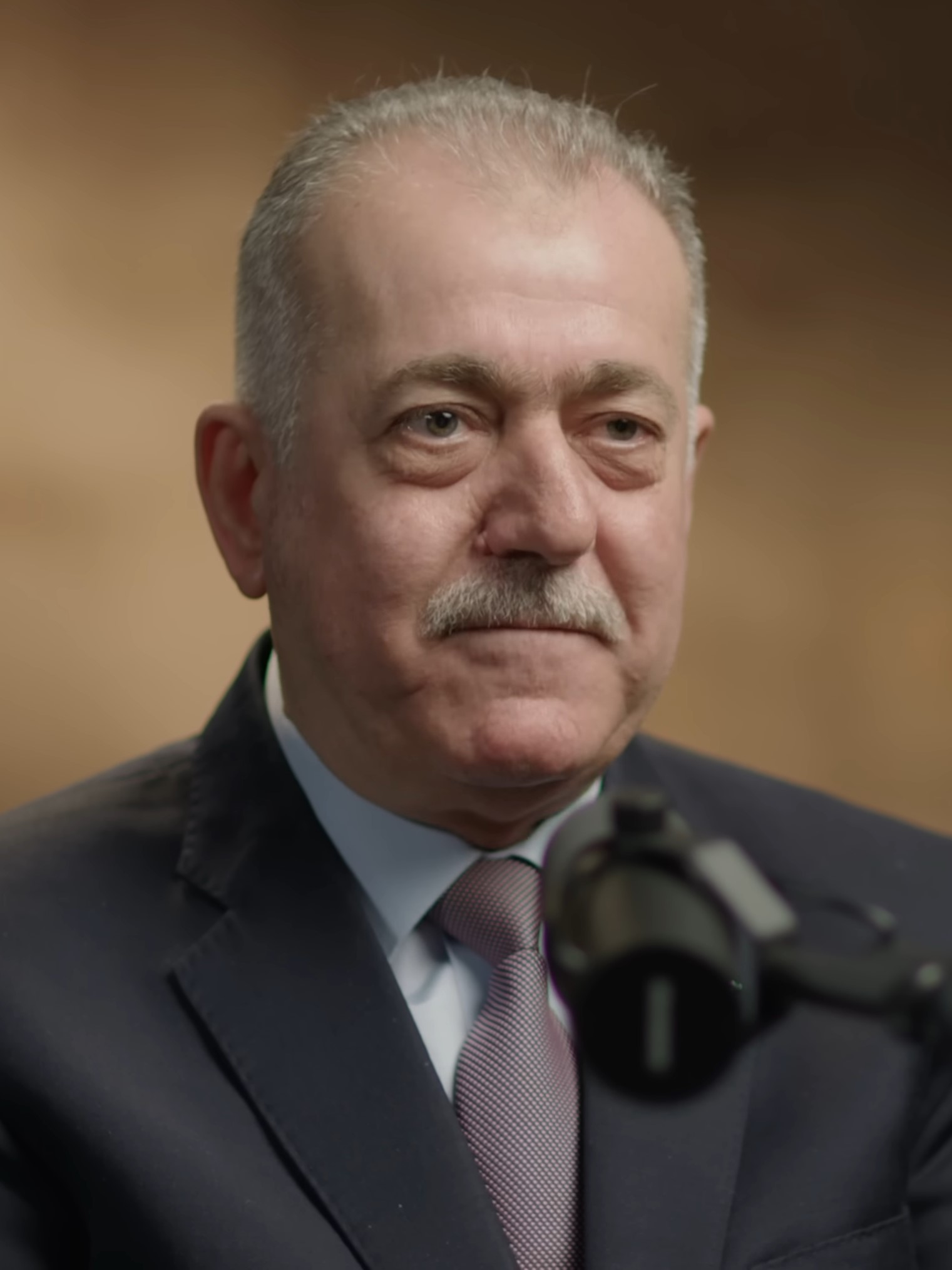
- al-Oqaidi in 2024
- Military career
- Allegiance: Ba'athist Syria (until 2011); (Syrian opposition) Free Syrian Army (2012–2016)
- Branch: Syrian Arab Army (until 2011); Free Syrian Army (2012–2016)
- Service years: 1989–2011
- Rank: Colonel
- Unit: Mechanized Infantry
- Commands: Aleppo Revolutionary Military Council
- Conflicts: Syrian civil war; Battle of Aleppo (2012–16); Siege of Menagh Air Base; Battle of al-Qusayr (2013); Operation Northern Storm

Abdul Jabbar al-Oqaidi (Arabic: عبد الجبار العكيدي, romanized: ʿAbd al-Jabbār al-ʿUkaydī) (also spelled al-Aqidi or al-Okaidi or al-Egaydi) is a former commander and spokesman for the Free Syrian Army in Aleppo. A former colonel in the Syrian Arab Army, he defected in early 2012. On 3 November 2013, he announced his resignation from the Aleppo Revolutionary Military Council due to disunity among the rebels and constant retreats from battles, including the Aleppo offensive (October–December 2013).
