= Azzam Fadhel Khanji =

Syrian educator and politician (born 1966)

- عزام فاضل خانجي

Member of the People's Assembly
- Incumbent
- Assumed office 12 July 2026
- Constituency: Mount Simeon

Personal details
- Born: 1966 (age 59–60) Aleppo, Syria
- Party: Independent (MBS)
- Education: University of Aleppo (BA)

Azzam Fadhel Khanji (Arabic: عزام فاضل خانجي; born 1966) is a Syrian educator and politician who has served as a member of the People's Assembly for the constituency of Mount Simeon since October 2025. Before entering parliament, he was active in education administration, humanitarian organizations, and opposition-led local governance during the Syrian civil war. Following the fall of the Assad regime, he served as Deputy Governor of Aleppo for Education Affairs.

Khanji began his career in private education in Aleppo, where he founded and directed several educational institutions. During the Syrian revolution, he participated in the revolutionary movement in Aleppo and became involved in civilian opposition institutions, including local governance bodies, educational initiatives, and humanitarian organizations. He later served in the education sector of the Syrian Interim Government and founded the educational organization Education Without Borders (MIDAD).

== Biography ==
Khanji was born in 1966 in Aleppo, Syria, into a prominent local family historically linked to the Muslim Brotherhood in Syria. He earned a bachelor's degree in English Literature from the University of Aleppo, followed by a diploma in educational training. Before the Syrian civil war, he worked in private education. He founded the Ataa Institute for Sciences and Languages and served as director of both Al-Ibdaa Private School and Al-Ma'ali Private School. Between approximately 2007 and 2011, he also directed the Islamic Charitable Society and Orphanage in Aleppo.

Following the outbreak of the Syrian revolution in 2011, Khanji became involved in civilian opposition activities in Aleppo. In late 2011, he participated in establishing Aleppo Today TV (قناة حلب اليوم) and later served on its board of trustees. In August 2012, he was among the founders of the Revolutionary Transitional Council of Aleppo Governorate, one of several local civilian bodies established in opposition-held areas. He also helped establish the humanitarian initiative Balad, which subsequently developed into the Balad Organization. Khanji was elected twice to the Free Aleppo Provincial Council, where he headed its Office of Education and Culture. Between 2014 and 2016, he served as Director of the Education Office in the Ministry of Education of the Syrian Interim Government.

Following the fall of the Assad regime, Khanji was appointed Deputy Governor of Aleppo for Education Affairs in May 2025. He subsequently contested the 2025 Syrian parliamentary election in the Mount Simeon constituency and was elected to the People's Assembly in October 2025. Although the Muslim Brotherhood did not officially contest the elections, Khanji led a local electoral list that reportedly included several candidates from Brotherhood backgrounds.
