= Tell al-Daman =

Tell al-Daman تل الضمان
- Village
- Location in Syria
- Coordinates: 35°48′31″N 37°15′15″E
- Country: Syria
- Governorate: Aleppo
- District: Mount Simeon
- Subdistrict: Tell al-Daman
- Control: (Syria) Syrian transitional government

Population (2004)
  - Total: 872
- Time zone: UTC+3 (AST)
- City Qrya Pcode: C1170

Tell al-Daman (Arabic: تل الضمان) is a Syrian village located in Mount Simeon District, Aleppo. According to the Syria Central Bureau of Statistics (CBS), Tell al-Daman had a population of 872 in the 2004 census.
