= As-Safira District =

as-Safira District منطقة السفيرة
- District
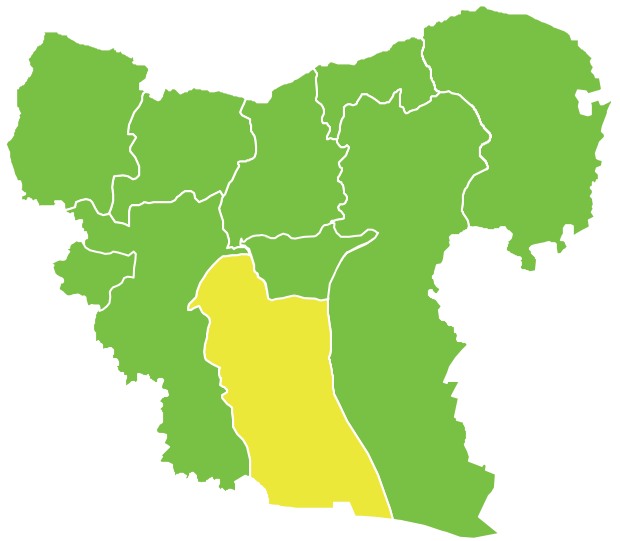
- Location of as-Safira District within Aleppo Governorate

- Location in Syria
- Coordinates (as-Safira): 36.07°N 37.37°E
- Country: Syria
- Governorate: Aleppo
- Seat: as-Safira
- Subdistricts: 5 nawāḥī

Area
  - Total: 2,850.56 km^{2} (1,100.61 sq mi)

Population (2004)
  - Total: 178,293
  - Density: 62.5467/km^{2} (161.995/sq mi)
- Geocode: SY0207

as-Safira District (Arabic: منطقة السفيرة, romanized: manṭiqat as-Safīrah) is a district of Aleppo Governorate in northern Syria. Administrative centre is the city of as-Safira. At the 2004 census, the district had a population of 178,293.

Sub-Districts of as-Safira District

The administrative center of Nahiya as-Safira shown above is the city of as-Safira.

The administrative center of Nahiya Banan shown above is the city of Banan.

The administrative center of Nahiya Al-Hajib shown above is the city of Al-Hajib.

The administrative center of Nahiya Khanasir shown above is the city of Khanasir.

The main towns are as-Safira and Khanasir. The main economic activity is agriculture. Since ancient times, as-Safira was a fertile area where grains and other crops were harvested.

== Sub-districts ==
The district of as-Safira is divided into five sub-districts or nawāḥī (population as of 2004):

Subdistricts of as-Safira District
Code	Name	Area	Population	Seat
SY020700	as-Safira Subdistrict	846.37 km²	132,658	as-Safira
	Tell Aran Subdistrict	846.37 km²	132,658	Tell Aran
SY020701	Khanasir Subdistrict	1,603.98 km²	17,618	Khanasir
SY020702	Banan Subdistrict	140.06 km²	17,193	Banan
SY020703	al-Hajib Subdistrict	260.16 km²	10,408	al-Hajib

- In 2009, the northwestern area around the majority Kurdish city of Tell Aran was spun off al-Safira Subdistrict to establish Tell Aran Subdistrict.
