= Tiyara =

- village
- Location in Uttar Pradesh, India Tiyara (India)
- Coordinates: 25.6828584°N 83.1722116°E
- Country: India
- State: Uttar Pradesh
- District: Azamgarh
- Talukas: Lalganj

Population (2001)
  - Total: 2,157

Languages
  - Official: Hindi
- Time zone: UTC+5:30 (IST)

Tiyara is a village located in Tarwa block in the south east corner of Azamgarh district under Lalganj tehsil, Uttar Pradesh, India. The village is governed by a gram panchayat.
