= Sabkhat al-Jabbul =

Lake in Syria

- سبخة الجبول (Arabic)
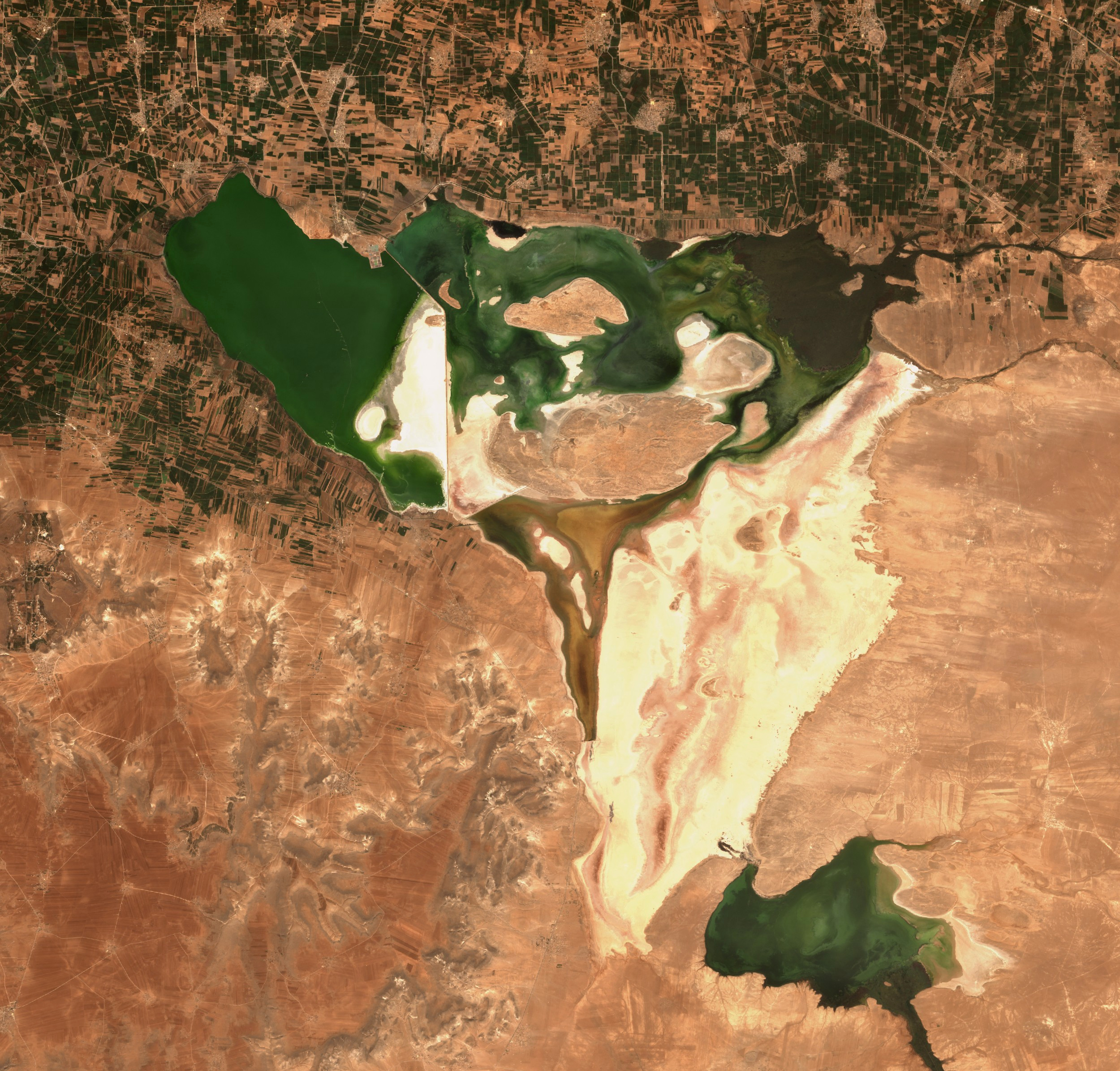
- Sentinel-2 image (2022)

- Location within Syria
- Location: Aleppo Governorate
- Coordinates: 36°04′N 037°30′E
- Type: Salt lake
- Basin countries: Syria
- Surface area: 100 km^{2} (39 sq mi)

Ramsar Wetland
- Official name: Sabkhat al-Jabbul Nature Reserve
- Designated: 5 March 1998
- Reference no.: 935

Sabkhat al-Jabbūl or Mamlahat al-Jabbūl or Lake Jabbūl (Arabic: سبخة الجبول) is a large, traditionally seasonal, saline lake and concurrent salt flats (sabkha) 30 km southeast of Aleppo, Syria, in the Bāb District of Aleppo Governorate. It is the largest natural lake in Syria and the second largest lake after the artificial Euphrates Lake. In 2009, the lake covered about 100 km^{2} (39 sq mi) and was relatively stable. The salt flats are extensive. The area includes the Sabkhat al-Jabbul Nature Reserve, a protected waterfowl site.

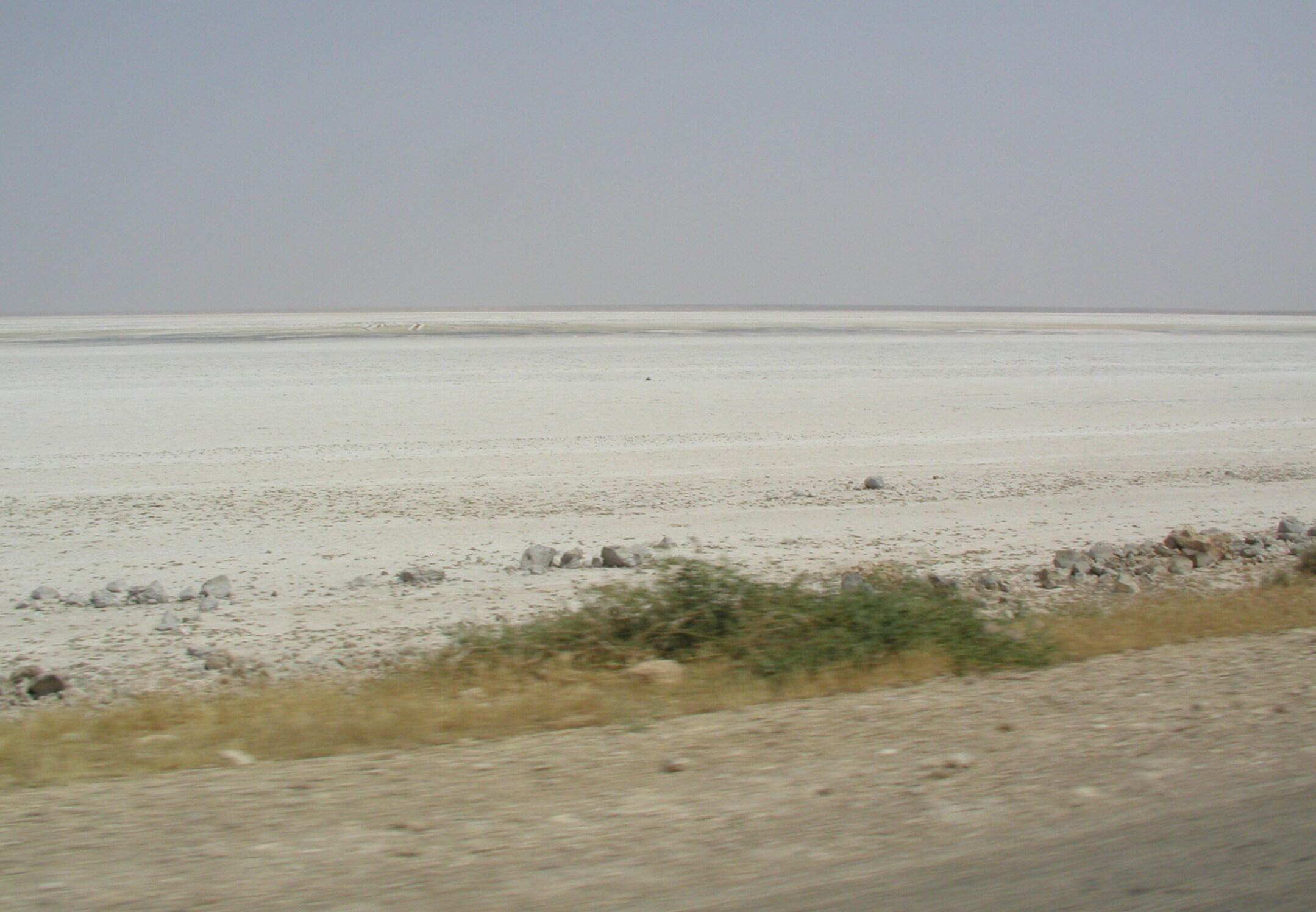
Shallow parts of the lake go dry in August leaving salt crystals on the floor

Today the Sabkhat al-Jabbul exists within a closed basin, but during the Pleistocene the basin filled, overflowed and formed a tributary of the Euphrates. The lake traditionally flooded in the spring, shrinking back during the summer and autumn. However, starting in 1988, irrigation projects on adjacent lands started discharging significant amounts of partially saline water into the basin, stabilizing the water table and creating a lake of 100 km^{2} (39 sq mi).

== Resource use ==
Primary uses of the area include waterfowl hunting, livestock grazing on the surrounding steppe and salt extraction. Al-Jubbul is the major source of salt in Syria, other sources include Lake Jayrud, Rif Dimashq Governorate, to the northeast of Damascus and Lake Khatuniyah (Khatunia), Al-Hasakah Governorate, to the northeast of Al-Hasakah, near the village of Al Hawi and the Iraqi border.

== Use of salt ==
Rock salt from Sabkhat al-Jabbul was used in the "salt rooms" at Sednaya Prison. The rooms were used as mortuaries to preserve the cadavers of deceased inmates in the absence of refrigerated morgues.
