= Khanasir =

Khanasir خناصر Хъэнасыр
- Town
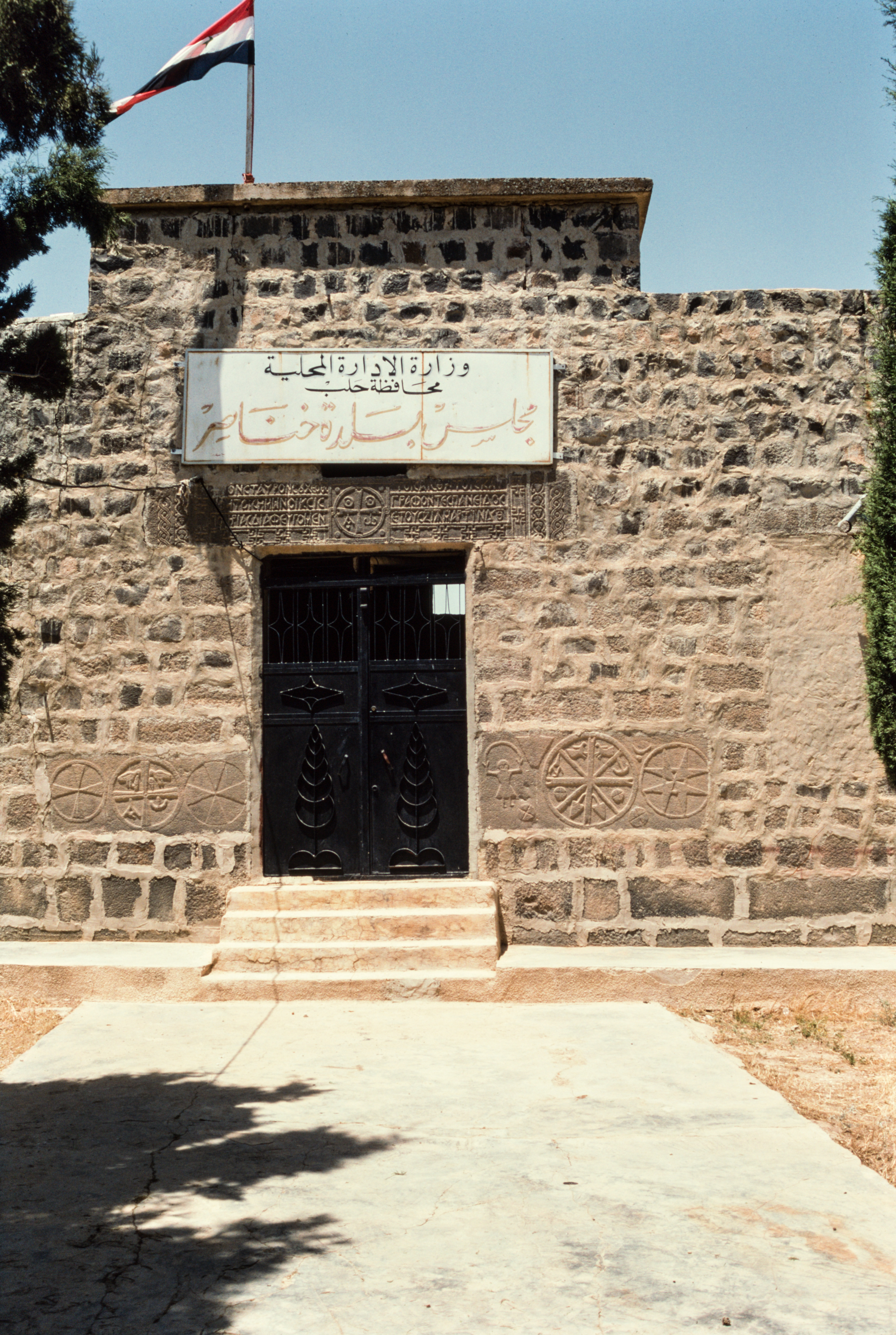
- Ministry of Local Administration, Khanasir. Note old parts in the facade.

- Location within Syria
- Coordinates: 35°47′0″N 37°29′50″E
- Country: Syria
- Governorate: Aleppo
- District: Al-Safira
- Subdistrict: Khanasir
- Established: est. 4th century

Population (2004 census)
  - Total: 2,397
- Time zone: UTC+2 (EET)
  - Summer (DST): UTC+3 (EEST)
- Area code: Country code: 963

Khanasir (Arabic: خناصر / ALA-LC: Khanāṣir; Kabardian: Хъэнасыр), also spelt Khanaseer or Khanaser, is a town located in Syria's as-Safira District. It is one of twenty-four towns and villages located in the Khanasir valley, an area with a population of 11,000 people.

== History ==
Khanasir is the administrative center of Nahiya Khanasir of the as-Safira District.

The town is mentioned by Pliny the Elder as "Chenneseri"; the etymology of Khanasir does not exist in Aramaic, and an Arabic etymology is unlikely (an implausible one being "Khinsar" which mean "the little finger"). An Akkadian etymology is also possible, with the name deriving from the word "Hunsiru", a variant of the word "Humsiru" meaning a rat or a mouse.

During the Byzantine era, the town was known as Anasartha, enclosed within ramparts in western Syria; Malalas records that it was a kastron (fortified hilltop settlement) that was designated a polis by the Byzantine emperor Justinian I. A qanat dating back to Byzantine times that served as the water source for the village remained operational well into the 20th century. According to Robert L. France, Byzantine-era remains of Anasartha "are visible on the street, in newly built walls, and inside residential houses," in Khanasir today. Anasartha and its surrounding villages enjoyed a period of prosperity between the late 4th century and early 6th century. The vast majority of the houses and churches discovered in this region are of that period. The church in Anasartha itself dates from 426. Its bishop Maras took part in the Council of Chalcedon in 451, and his successor Cyrus was a signatory of the letter that the bishops of the province sent in 458 to the Byzantine Emperor Leo I the Thracian to protest about the killing of Proterius of Alexandria. Another bishop built a "refuge" in neighbouring Buz al-Khanzir in 506-507. No longer a residential bishopric, Anasartha is today listed by the Catholic Church as a titular see.

Khanasir, known to the early Arabs as "Khunasira", became a fortified estate and frequent residence of the Umayyad caliph Umar II (r. 717–720). He died and was buried there.

=== Modern era ===
At the turn of the 20th century, Circassian immigrants from Manbij, northeast of Aleppo, settled in Khanasir, using old building materials from the site to reestablish the town. While the Byzantine-era qanat ceased to supply water to the village after the construction of pump wells in the area west of the Khanasir valley in 1975, the 12.0 km (7.5 mi)-long structure was described by Hamidé in 1959 as discharging 8 litres per second, irrigating a land area of 0.15 km^{2} (37 acres).

On 23 February 2016, the Syrian Observatory for Human Rights reported that the Islamic State had captured the town which is located along a major road and supply route to the city of Aleppo. Two days later, the Syrian Arab Army, backed by Russian airstrikes and Hezbollah fighters, managed to recapture the town back from Islamic State militants.

== Archaeology ==
Anasartha is the site of a number of Christian inscriptions into stone, or epigraphs.

Geoffrey Greatrex and Samuel N. C. Lieu write that building work continued in Anasartha in the seventh century and that these epigraphs provide evidence of Roman resistance to Persian invasions.

== Climate ==
A marginal dryland environment, the rainy season in Khanasir falls between October and May with an average annual rainfall of 210 millimetres. Variability between years is high, with 50% of the years between 1929 and 2004 receiving over 200.0 mm (7.87 in), and 25% receiving over 250.0 mm (9.84 in).

July and August are the hottest months with an average daily maximum temperature of 37 °C (99 °F). The lowest average daily minimum temperature is 2.3 °C (36.1 °F) in January. While the temperature can fall below 0 °C (32 °F) at night in November and December, it hardly ever remains that low throughout the day.

== Economy ==
Like the rest of the villagers of the Khanasir valley, those living in Khanasir derive their income from diverse sources, with the majority working either as agriculturalists, pastoralists, or land-poor labourers. Agriculturalists make a per capita income of US$1.30 to $2 per day, supplementing their income from the growing of crops with the fattening of animals and waged labour. Some 40% of the residents of the Khanasir valley are agriculturalists and this sub-section of the population comprises the major land-owning group in the area. Pastoralists and herders migrate, earning a per capita income of $1 to 1.50 per day and often take up fattening to supplement their incomes. Land-poor labourers own some land, between 0.035 km^{2} (8.6 acres) and 0.07 km^{2} (17 acres), but make their income by working on the land of others, earning less than $1 per day.

== Bibliography ==
- Burns, Ross (2009). The monuments of Syria: a guide. I. B. Tauris. ISBN 978-1845119478.
- Ball, Warwick (2001). Rome in the East: The Transformation of an Empire. Routledge. ISBN 0-415-11376-8.
- France, Robert L (2007). Handbook of Regenerative Landscape Design. CRC Press. ISBN 0-8493-9188-1, ISBN 978-0-8493-9188-0.
- Greatrex, Geoffrey and Samuel N. C. Lieu (2002). The Roman Eastern Frontier and the Persian Wars. Routledge. ISBN 0-415-14687-9, ISBN 978-0-415-14687-6.
- Kennedy, Hugh (2006). The Byzantine and Early Islamic Near East. Ashgate Publishing, Ltd. ISBN 0-7546-5909-7, ISBN 978-0-7546-5909-9.
- Musil, Alois (1928). Palmyrena: A Topographical Itinerary. American Geographical Society.
