= As-Safira =

City in Syria

As-Safira السفيرة Sfireh, Sipri
- City
- Location in Syria
- Coordinates: 36°04′N 37°22′E
- Country: Syria
- Governorate: Aleppo
- District: Al-Safira
- Subdistrict: Al-Safira
- Elevation: 348 m (1,142 ft)

Population (2007 est.)
  - Total: 106,382
- Time zone: UTC+2 (EET)
  - Summer (DST): +3

As-Safira (Arabic: السَّفِيْرَة / ALA-LC: as-Safīrah; Aleppo dialect: Sfīre) is a Syrian city administratively belonging to the Aleppo Governorate. It is the administrative center of the as-Safira District. As Safīrah has an altitude of 348 meters (1,142 ft), and a population of 106,382 as of 2007, making it the 11th largest city per geographical entity in Syria.

== Name ==
As-Safira is the administrative center of Nahiya as-Safira and as-Safira District.

Medieval geographer Yaqut al-Hamawi spells the name Asfīrah (أسفيرة), not as-Safira (السفيرة), which indicates that the definite article in the modern spelling is a result of hypercorrection.

As-Safira was known in pre-Islamic times as Sipri. Historians have suggested that the name Sipri may have come from the Akkadian word siparru meaning "bronze", which might indicate that copper was mined and bronze was worked there.

== History ==
Since ancient times the city has been the distribution point for salt gathered from the nearby Sabkhat al-Jabbul.

=== Archeological findings ===
The Sfire I Treaty which may contain 8th century BCE evidence of a deity called "Most High."

=== Syrian civil war ===
In the 2024 Operation Dawn of Freedom, it was captured by the Syrian National Army.

== Geography ==
=== Climate ===
As-Safira has a cold semi-arid climate (Köppen climate classification: BSk).

Climate data for As Safira
Month	Jan	Feb	Mar	Apr	May	Jun	Jul	Aug	Sep	Oct	Nov	Dec	Year
Mean daily maximum °C (°F)	10.8 (51.4)	13.3 (55.9)	17.7 (63.9)	23.1 (73.6)	29.6 (85.3)	34.7 (94.5)	37.0 (98.6)	37.4 (99.3)	33.7 (92.7)	28.2 (82.8)	20.0 (68.0)	12.9 (55.2)	24.9 (76.8)
Mean daily minimum °C (°F)	1.8 (35.2)	2.6 (36.7)	5.2 (41.4)	8.9 (48.0)	13.6 (56.5)	17.9 (64.2)	20.5 (68.9)	20.7 (69.3)	16.9 (62.4)	12.1 (53.8)	6.6 (43.9)	3.5 (38.3)	10.9 (51.5)
Average precipitation mm (inches)	59 (2.3)	48 (1.9)	32 (1.3)	36 (1.4)	17 (0.7)	2 (0.1)	0 (0)	0 (0)	1 (0.0)	16 (0.6)	19 (0.7)	59 (2.3)	289 (11.3)
Average snowy days	0.9	0.1	0	0	0	0	0	0	0	0	0	0.2	1.2
Source: Climate-data.org.

== Bibliography ==
- le Strange, Guy (1890). Palestine Under the Moslems: A Description of Syria and the Holy Land from A.D. 650 to 1500. Committee of the Palestine Exploration Fund.
