= Mount Simeon District =

Mount Simeon District منطقة جبل سمعان
- District
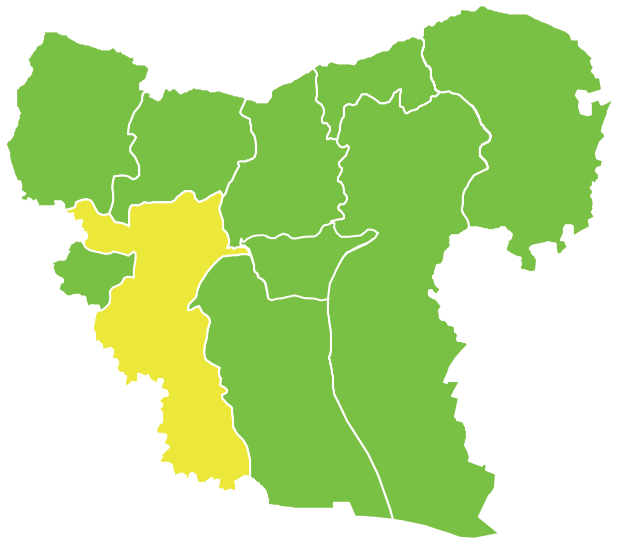
- Location of Mount Simeon District within Aleppo Governorate

- Location in Syria
- Coordinates (Aleppo): 36.22°N 37.17°E
- Country: Syria
- Governorate: Aleppo
- Seat: Aleppo
- Subdistricts: 7 nawāḥī

Area
  - Total: 2,757.27 km^{2} (1,064.59 sq mi)

Population (2004)
  - Total: 2,413,878
  - Density: 875.459/km^{2} (2,267.43/sq mi)
- Geocode: SY0200

Mount Simeon District (Arabic: منطقة جبل سمعان, romanized: manṭiqat Jabal Sem‘ān) is a district of Aleppo Governorate in northern Syria. The administrative centre is the city of Aleppo.

Until December 2008, the sub-district of Atāreb was part of Mount Simeon District before being incorporated as a separate district. At the 2004 census, the remaining sub-districts had a total population of 2,413,878.

== Sub-districts ==
The district of Mount Simeon is divided into seven sub-districts or nawāḥī (population as of 2004):

Subdistricts of Mount Simeon District
Code	Name	Area	Population	Seat	Location
SY020000	Mount Simeon Subdistrict	663.95 km²	2,181,061	Aleppo	
SY020002	Tell ad-Daman Subdistrict	1,146.95 km²	47,501	Tell al-Daman	
SY020003	Haritan Subdistrict	232.76 km²	67,745	Haritan	
SY020004	Darat Izza Subdistrict	227.49 km²	39,540	Darat Izza	
SY020005	al-Zirbah Subdistrict	354.79 km²	55,391	al-Zirbah	
	Zammar Subdistrict	354.79 km²	55,391	Zammar	
SY020006	Hadher Subdistrict	131.33 km²	20,834	Al-Hadher	

Zammar Subdistrict was separated from al-Zirbah Subdistrict in 2009.

== See also ==
- Mount Simeon
