= Ayn al-Bayda, Jarabulus =

Ayn al-Bayda عين البيضا
- Village
- Location of Ayn al-Bayda in Syria
- Coordinates: 36°43′30″N 37°58′40″E
- Country: Syria
- Governorate: Aleppo
- District: Jarabulus
- Subdistrict: Jarabulus

Population (2004)
  - Total: 1,111
- Time zone: UTC+2 (EET)
  - Summer (DST): UTC+3 (EEST)
- Geocode: C2233

Ayn al-Bayda (Arabic: عين البيضا, romanized: ‘Ayn al Bayḑā; Turkish: Akpınar) is a village in northern Aleppo Governorate, northern Syria. Situated on the northern Manbij Plain, about halfway between Jarabulus and the lower course of Sajur River, the village is located about 4 kilometres (2.5 mi) west of river Euphrates and about 9 km (5.6 mi) south of the border to the Turkish province of Gaziantep.

With 1,111 inhabitants, as per the 2004 census, Ayn al-Bayda administratively belongs to Nahiya Jarabulus within Jarabulus District. It is inhabited by Turkmens of the Barak tribe. Nearby localities include Amarnah 3 km (1.9 mi) to the northeast, Mazaalah 3 km (1.9 mi) to the northwest, and Dabis 2.5 km (1.6 mi) to the southwest.
