= Qandariyah =

Qandariyah قندرية
- Village
- Location of Qandariyah in Syria
- Coordinates: 36°44′35″N 37°53′23″E
- Country: Syria
- Governorate: Aleppo
- District: Jarabulus
- Subdistrict: Jarabulus
- Elevation: 422 m (1,385 ft)

Population (2004)
  - Total: 888
- Time zone: UTC+2 (EET)
  - Summer (DST): UTC+3 (EEST)
- Geocode: C2241

Qandariyah (Arabic: قندرية, romanized: Qundurīyah; Turkish: Gındırıya) is a village in northern Aleppo Governorate, northern Syria. Situated on the northern Manbij Plain, halfway between Jarabulus and the lower course of Sajur River, the village is located about 12 kilometres (7.5 mi) west of river Euphrates and about 6 km (3.7 mi) south of the border to the Turkish province of Gaziantep. It is inhabited by Turkmen.

With 888 inhabitants, as per the 2004 census, Qandariyah administratively belongs to Nahiya Jarabulus within Jarabulus District. Nearby localities include Ghassaniyah 2.5 km (1.6 mi) to the west, al-Bir Fawqani 3 km (1.9 mi) to the north, and Yusuf Bayk 3 km (1.9 mi) to the east.
