= Balaban, Syria =

Balaban بلابان
- Village
- Location of Balaban in Syria
- Coordinates: 36°41′N 37°58′E
- Country: Syria
- Governorate: Aleppo
- District: Jarabulus
- Subdistrict: Jarabulus

Population (2004)
  - Total: 227
- Time zone: UTC+2 (EET)
  - Summer (DST): UTC+3 (EEST)

Balaban (Arabic: بلابان, romanized: Bālābān) is a village in northern Aleppo Governorate, northern Syria. Situated on the northern Manbij Plain, about halfway between Jarabulus and Manbij, the village is located about 9 kilometres (5.6 mi) west of river Euphrates, and 5 km (3.1 mi) north of the lower course of Sajur River.

With 227 inhabitants, as per the 2004 census, Balaban administratively belongs to Nahiya Jarabulus within Jarabulus District. Nearby localities include Dabis 4 km (2.5 mi) to the north. The village is inhabited by Turkmen.
