= Mazaalah, Jarabulus =

Mazaalah مزعلة
- Village
- Location of Mazaalah in Syria
- Coordinates: 36°43′56″N 37°56′29″E
- Country: Syria
- Governorate: Aleppo
- District: Jarabulus
- Subdistrict: Jarabulus

Population (2004)
  - Total: 987
- Time zone: UTC+2 (EET)
  - Summer (DST): UTC+3 (EEST)
- Geocode: C2240

Mazaalah (Arabic: مزعلة, romanized: Māz‘ālāh; Turkish: Mızale or Mizali) is a village in northern Aleppo Governorate, north of Syria. Situated on the northern Manbij Plain, about halfway between Jarabulus and the lower course of Sajur River, the village is located about 8 kilometres (5.0 mi) west of river Euphrates and about 9 km (5.6 mi) south of the border to the Turkish province of Gaziantep.

With 987 inhabitants, as per the 2004 census, Mazaalah administratively belongs to Nahiya Jarabulus within Jarabulus District. Turkmen inhabits the village. Nearby localities include Yusuf Bayk 2 km (1.2 mi) to the northwest, and Ayn al-Bayda 3 km (1.9 mi) to the southeast.
