= Fursan, Syria =

al-Fursan الفرسان
- Village
- Location of Al-Fursan in Syria
- Coordinates: 36°43′36″N 37°42′22″E
- Country: Syria
- Governorate: Aleppo
- District: Jarabulus
- Subdistrict: Ghandoura

Population (2004)
  - Total: 565
- Time zone: UTC+2 (EET)
  - Summer (DST): UTC+3 (EEST)
- Geocode: C2252

Al-Fursan (Arabic: الفرسان; Turkish: Sipahiler, lit. 'cavalrymen') is a village in northern Aleppo Governorate, northwestern Syria. Administratively belonging to Nahiya Ghandoura in Jarabulus District, the village is inhabited by Turkmen and had a population of 565 as per the 2004 census. It is located midway between Al-Rai and Jarabulus, at the eastern banks of Sajur Lake. Nearby localities include Arab Azzah to the north and Lilawa to the southeast.
