= Dabis, Syria =

ad-Dabis الدابس
- Village
- Location of ad-Dabis in Syria
- Coordinates: 36°42′13″N 37°57′25″E
- Country: Syria
- Governorate: Aleppo
- District: Jarabulus
- Subdistrict: Jarabulus
- Elevation: 414 m (1,358 ft)

Population (2004)
  - Total: 880
- Time zone: UTC+2 (EET)
  - Summer (DST): UTC+3 (EEST)
- Geocode: C2217

Dabis (Arabic: الدابس, romanized: ad-Dabes) is a village in northern Aleppo Governorate, northern Syria. Situated on the northern Manbij Plain, between Jarabulus and the lower course of Sajur River, the village is located about 8 kilometres (5.0 mi) west of river Euphrates and about 12 km (7.5 mi) south of the border to the Turkish province of Gaziantep.

With 880 inhabitants, as per the 2004 census, Dabis administratively belongs to Nahiya Jarabulus within Jarabulus District. The village is inhabited by Turkmen. Nearby localities include Ayn al-Bayda 3 km (1.9 mi) to the northeast, Balaban 4 km (2.5 mi) to the south, and Jubb al-Kusa 4 km (2.5 mi) to the southeast. قرية الدابس تقع في الشمال السوري تتبع ادرايا الى منطقة جرابلس سكانها من التركمان عدد سكانها حوالي ٢٠٠٠ نسمة
