= Tall Shair =

Tall Shair تل الشعير
- Village
- Location of Tall Shair in Syria
- Coordinates: 36°46′34″N 37°57′04″E
- Country: Syria
- Governorate: Aleppo
- District: Jarabulus
- Subdistrict: Jarabulus
- Elevation: 441 m (1,447 ft)
- Time zone: UTC+2 (EET)
  - Summer (DST): UTC+3 (EEST)

Tall Shair (Arabic: تل الشعير, romanized: Tall ash-Sha‘īr; Turkish: Tel Şaeir) is a village in northern Aleppo Governorate, northern Syria. Situated on the northern Manbij Plain, the village is located about 7 kilometres (4.3 mi) southwest of Jarabulus, and just about 5 km (3.1 mi) south of the border with the Turkish province of Gaziantep.

Tall Shair administratively belongs to Nahiya Jarabulus within Jarabulus District. Nearby localities include al-Hajaliyah 2 km (1.2 mi) to the north, and Haymar 2 km (1.2 mi) to the southwest. The village is inhabited by Turkmen.
