= Yusuf Bayk =

Yusuf Bayk يوسف بك
- Village
- Location in Syria
- Coordinates: 36°44′22″N 37°55′23″E
- Country: Syria
- Governorate: Aleppo
- District: Jarabulus
- Subdistrict: Jarabulus
- Elevation: 414 m (1,358 ft)

Population (2004)
  - Total: 1,138
- Time zone: UTC+2 (EET)
  - Summer (DST): UTC+3 (EEST)
- Geocode: C2236

Yusuf Bayk (Arabic: يوسف بك, romanized: Yūsuf Bayk; Turkish: Yusuf Bey) is a village in northern Aleppo Governorate, northern Syria. Situated on the northern Manbij Plain, halfway between Jarabulus and the lower course of Sajur River, the village is located about 9 kilometres (5.6 mi) west of river Euphrates and about 6 km (3.7 mi) south of the border with the Turkish province of Gaziantep.

With 1,138 inhabitants, as per the 2004 census, Yusuf Bayk administratively belongs to Nahiya Jarabulus within Jarabulus District. The village is inhabited by Turkmen. Nearby localities include Haymar 2.5 km (1.6 mi) to the north, Qandariyah 3 km (1.9 mi) to the west, and Mazaalah 2 km (1.2 mi) to the southeast.
