= Al-Hajaliah =

al-Hajaliah الحجلية
- Village
- Location of al-Hajaliah in Syria
- Coordinates: 36°48′27″N 37°57′56″E
- Country: Syria
- Governorate: Aleppo
- District: Jarabulus
- Subdistrict: Jarabulus
- Elevation: 395 m (1,296 ft)

Population (2004)
  - Total: 574
- Time zone: UTC+2 (EET)
  - Summer (DST): UTC+3 (EEST)
- Geocode: C2215

al-Hajaliah (Arabic: الحجلية, romanized: al-Ḩajalīyah) is a village in northern Aleppo Governorate, northern Syria. Situated on the northern Manbij Plain, the village is located about 4 kilometres (2.5 mi) west of Jarabulus and river Euphrates, and just about 1.5 km (0.93 mi) south of the border to the Turkish province of Gaziantep.

With 574 inhabitants, as per the 2004 census, al-Hajaliah administratively belongs to Nahiya Jarabulus within Jarabulus District. Besides Jarabulus, nearby localities further include al-Haluwaniyah 4 km (2.5 mi) to the southwest, and Tall Shair 3 km (1.9 mi) to the south.
