= Qubbat at-Turkuman =

Qubbat at-Turkumān قبة التركمان
- Village
- Location of Qubbat at-Turkuman in Syria
- Coordinates: 36°41′20″N 37°43′40″E
- Country: Syria
- Governorate: Aleppo
- District: Jarabulus
- Subdistrict: Ghandoura

Population (2004)
  - Total: 1,186
- Time zone: UTC+2 (EET)
  - Summer (DST): UTC+3 (EEST)
- Geocode: C2263

Qubbat at-Turkumān (Arabic: قُبَّة التُّرْكُمَان, romanized: Qubbat at-Turkumān; Turkish: Kubbetü't-Türkümân), also known as Qubba (Arabic: قبه, romanized: Qubba; Turkish: Kubbe), is a village in northern Aleppo Governorate, northwestern Syria. Administratively belonging to Nahiya Ghandoura in Jarabulus District, the village has a population of 1,186 as per the 2004 census. It is located midway between Al-Rai and Jarabulus, at the western banks of Sajur River, less than a kilometer southwest of the Sajur Dam. Nearby localities include Lilawa to the north and Ghandoura to the southeast. The village is inhabited by Turkmen.
