= Al-Bir Tahtani =

al-Bir Tahtani البير التحتاني
- Village
- Location of al-Bir Tahtani in Syria
- Coordinates: 36°46′33″N 37°53′38″E
- Country: Syria
- Governorate: Aleppo
- District: Jarabulus
- Subdistrict: Jarabulus

Population (2004)
  - Total: 179
- Time zone: UTC+2 (EET)
  - Summer (DST): UTC+3 (EEST)
- Geocode: C2216

al-Bir Tahtani (Arabic: البير التحتاني, romanized: al-Bīr at-Taḥtānī) is a village in northern Aleppo Governorate, northern Syria. Situated on the northern Manbij Plain, just 1.5 kilometres (0.93 mi) south of the border with Turkey's Gaziantep province, the village lies approximately 11 km (6.8 mi) southwest of Jarabulus and the Euphrates River.

According to 2004 census, al-Bir Tahtani had a population of 179 inhabitants and administratively belongs to Nahiya Jarabulus in the Jarabulus District. Nearby localities include al-Haluwaniyah, located 2.5 km (1.6 mi) to the northeast, and al-Bir Fawqani, 2 km (1.2 mi) to the southwest.
