= Amarnah, Jarabulus =

Tall al-Amarnah تل العمارة Amranah ( عمارنة )
- Village
- Location of Tall al-Amarnah in Syria
- Coordinates: 36°44′32″N 38°00′40″E
- Country: Syria
- Governorate: Aleppo
- District: Jarabulus
- Subdistrict: Jarabulus
- Elevation: 356 m (1,168 ft)

Population (2004)
  - Total: 1,050
- Time zone: UTC+2 (EET)
  - Summer (DST): UTC+3 (EEST)
- Geocode: C2213

Amarnah (Arabic: تل العمارة, romanized: Tal al-'Amārat; Turkish: Amerne) or Amarine (Arabic: عمارنة, romanized: Âmārenah), also referred to as Tal al-Amara, is a village in northern Aleppo Governorate, northern Syria. Situated on the northern Manbij Plain, bordering the Jarabulus Plain's wetlands towards river Euphrates, the village is located about halfway between Jarabulus and the lower course of Sajur River, and about 9 km (5.6 mi) south of the border to the Turkish province of Gaziantep. It is inhabited by Turkmen of the Barak tribe. According to British archaeologist David George Hogarth, who visited the region in the early 20th century, the village was founded by Turks.

With 1,050 inhabitants, as per the 2004 census, Amarnah administratively belongs to Nahiya Jarabulus within Jarabulus District. Nearby localities include al-Jamel 3 km (1.9 mi) to the north, and Ayn al-Bayda 3 km (1.9 mi) to the northeast.
