= Al-Bir Fawqani =

al-Bir Fawqani البير فوقاني
- Village
- Location of al-Bir Fawqani in Syria
- Coordinates: 36°45′59″N 37°52′43″E
- Country: Syria
- Governorate: Aleppo
- District: Jarabulus
- Subdistrict: Jarabulus

Population (2004)
  - Total: 618
- Time zone: UTC+2 (EET)
  - Summer (DST): UTC+3 (EEST)

al-Bir Fawqani (Arabic: البير فوقاني, romanized: al-Bīr Fawqānī) is a village in northern Aleppo Governorate, northern Syria. Situated on the northern Manbij Plain, about halfway between Jarabulus and the Sajur Lake, the village is located just 2 kilometres (1.2 mi) south of the border to the Turkish province of Gaziantep, and about 13 km (8.1 mi) west of river Euphrates.

With 618 inhabitants, as per the 2004 census, al-Bir Fawqani administratively belongs to Nahiya Jarabulus within Jarabulus District. Nearby localities include Turaykham 3 km (1.9 mi) to the west, al-Bir Tahtani 2 km (1.2 mi) to the northeast, and Qandariyah 3 km (1.9 mi) to the south.
