= Haymar, Syria =

Haymar حيمر
- Village
- Location of Haymar in Syria
- Coordinates: 36°45′47″N 37°55′46″E
- Country: Syria
- Governorate: Aleppo
- District: Jarabulus
- Subdistrict: Jarabulus
- Elevation: 459 m (1,506 ft)

Population (2004)
  - Total: 1,749
- Time zone: UTC+2 (EET)
  - Summer (DST): UTC+3 (EEST)
- Geocode: C2229

Haymar (Arabic: حيمر, romanized: Ḩaymar), also spelled Heymer, is a village in northern Aleppo Governorate, northern Syria. Situated on the northern Manbij Plain, the village is located about 9 kilometres (5.6 mi) southwest of Jarabulus and about 4 km (2.5 mi) south of the border to the Turkish province of Gaziantep.

With 1,749 inhabitants, as per the 2004 census, Haymar administratively belongs to Nahiya Jarabulus within Jarabulus District. Nearby localities include al-Haluwaniyah 3 km (1.9 mi) to the northwest, Tall Shair 2 km (1.2 mi) to the northeast, and Yusuf Bayk 2.5 km (1.6 mi) to the south.
