= Al-Jamel =

al-Jamel الجامل
- Village
- Location of al-Jamel in Syria
- Coordinates: 36°46′02″N 38°00′39″E
- Country: Syria
- Governorate: Aleppo
- District: Jarabulus
- Subdistrict: Jarabulus
- Elevation: 338 m (1,109 ft)

Population (2004)
  - Total: 2,091
- Time zone: UTC+2 (EET)
  - Summer (DST): UTC+3 (EEST)
- Geocode: C2224

al-Jamel (Arabic: الجامل, romanized: ash-Shāmil; Turkish: Çemilli or Çamıl), alternatively spelled Shamil, is a village in northern Aleppo Governorate, northern Syria. Situated on the Jarabulus Plain's wetlands towards river Euphrates, the village is located 4 km (2.5 mi) to the south of Jarabulus, and about 5 km (3.1 mi) south of the border to the Turkish province of Gaziantep. It is inhabited by Turkmen of the Barak tribe.

With 2,091 inhabitants, as per the 2004 census, al-Jamel administratively belongs to Nahiya Jarabulus within Jarabulus District. Nearby localities include Marma al-Hajar 2 km (1.2 mi) to the northwest, and Amarnah 3 km (1.9 mi) to the south.
