= Lilawa =

Lilawa ليلوة
- Village
- Location of Lilawa in Syria
- Coordinates: 36°41′57″N 37°44′09″E
- Country: Syria
- Governorate: Aleppo
- District: Jarabulus
- Subdistrict: Ghandoura

Population (2004)
  - Total: 473
- Time zone: UTC+2 (EET)
  - Summer (DST): UTC+3 (EEST)
- Geocode: C2268

Lilawa (Arabic: ليلوة) is a village in northern Aleppo Governorate, northwestern Syria. Administratively belonging to Nahiya Ghandoura in Jarabulus District, the village has a population of 473 as per the 2004 census. It is located midway between al-Rai and Jarabulus, at the eastern banks of the Sajur River, immediately at the Sajur Dam. Nearby localities include Qebbet al-Turkmen to the southwest and Ghandoura to the southeast. It is inhabited by Syrian Turkmen.
