= Al-Haluwaniyah =

al-Haluwaniyah الحلوانية
- Village
- Location of al-Haluwaniyah in Syria
- Coordinates: 36°47′25″N 37°54′54″E
- Country: Syria
- Governorate: Aleppo
- District: Jarabulus
- Subdistrict: Jarabulus
- Elevation: 440 m (1,440 ft)

Population (2004)
  - Total: 763
- Time zone: UTC+2 (EET)
  - Summer (DST): UTC+3 (EEST)
- Geocode: C2214

al-Haluwaniyah (Arabic: الحلوانية, romanized: al-Ḥalwāniyah) is a village in northern Aleppo Governorate, northern Syria. Situated on the northern Manbij Plain, the village is located about 9 kilometres (5.6 mi) southwest of Jarabulus and less than 1 km (0.62 mi) south of the border to the Turkish province of Gaziantep.

With 763 inhabitants, as per the 2004 census, al-Haluwaniyah administratively belongs to Nahiya Jarabulus within Jarabulus District. Nearby localities include al-Hajalieh 4 km (2.5 mi) to the northeast, Haymar 3 km (1.9 mi) to the southeast, and al-Bir Tahtani 2.5 km (1.6 mi) to the southwest.
