= Nabghah, Jarabulus =

Nabghah نبغة
- Village
- Location of Nabghah in Syria
- Coordinates: 36.63760°N 37.66985°E
- Country: Syria
- Governorate: Aleppo
- District: Jarabulus
- Subdistrict: Ghandoura

Population (2004)
  - Total: 99

Nabghah (Arabic: نبغة), is a village in northern Aleppo Governorate, northern Syria. With 99 inhabitants, as per the 2004 census, Nabghah administratively belongs to Ghandoura Subdistrict within Jarabulus District. The village is inhabited by Turkmen.
