= Arab Azzah =

Arab Azzah عرب عزة
- Village
- Location of Arab Azzah
- Coordinates: 36°44′15″N 37°41′36″E
- Country: Syria
- Governorate: Aleppo
- District: Jarabulus
- Subdistrict: Ghandoura

Population (2004)
  - Total: 417
- Time zone: UTC+2 (EET)
  - Summer (DST): UTC+3 (EEST)
- Geocode: C2242

Arab Azzah (Arabic: عرب عزة, Turkish: Arap Azizi) is a village in northern Aleppo Governorate, northwestern Syria. It is located midway between al-Rai and Jarabulus, at the eastern banks of Sajur River, just north of Sajur Lake and close to the Syria–Turkey border. Administratively belonging to Nahiya Ghandoura in Jarabulus District, the village has a population of 417 as per the 2004 census. The village is inhabited by Turkmen of the Elbegli tribe.
