= Marma al-Hajar =

Marma al-Hajar مرمى الحجر Dhashtan
- Village
- Location of Marma al-Hajar in Syria
- Coordinates: 36°46′57″N 37°59′37″E
- Country: Syria
- Governorate: Aleppo
- District: Jarabulus
- Subdistrict: Jarabulus
- Elevation: 329 m (1,079 ft)

Population (2004)
  - Total: 1,818
- Time zone: UTC+3 (AST)
- Geocode: C2238

Marma al-Hajar (Arabic: مرمى الحجر, romanized: Marmā al-Ḥajar), originally Dashatan (Arabic: طاش اوتان, romanized: Ṭāsh Awtān; Turkish: Taşatan, lit. 'stone thrower'), is a village in northern Aleppo Governorate, northern Syria, on the northern Manbij Plain bordering the Jarabulus Plain's wetlands near the Euphrates River. It is 3 km (1.9 mi) south of Jarabulus and about 4 km (2.5 mi) south of the Syria–Turkey border. It is inhabited by Turkmen of the Barak tribe.

It had 1,818 inhabitants in the 2004 census. Administratively it belongs to Nahiya Jarabulus in Jarabulus District.
