= Al-Kuliya, Jarabulus =

Al-Kuliya الكلية
- Village
- Location of al-Kuliya in Syria
- Coordinates: 36.72085°N 37.82197°E
- Country: Syria
- Governorate: Aleppo
- District: Jarabulus
- Subdistrict: Ghandoura

Population (2004)
  - Total: 590

Al-Kuliya (Arabic: الكلية; Turkish: Kullu, كلله), is a village in northern Aleppo Governorate, northern Syria. With 590 inhabitants, as per the 2004 census, Al-Kuliya administratively belongs to Ghandoura Subdistrict within Jarabulus District. The village is inhabited by Turkmen.
