= Al-Shahid, Jarabulus =

Al-Shahid الشهيد
- Village
- Location of Tell Aghbar in Syria
- Coordinates: 36.62967°N 37.73696°E
- Country: Syria
- Governorate: Aleppo
- District: Jarabulus
- Subdistrict: Ghandoura

Population (2004)
  - Total: 237

Al-Shahid (Arabic: الشهيد; Turkish: Mirza Şehit), is a village in northern Aleppo Governorate, northern Syria. With 237 inhabitants, as per the 2004 census, al-Shahid administratively belongs to Ghandoura Subdistrict within Jarabulus District. The village is inhabited by Turkmen.
