= Jubb al-Dam, Jarabulus =

Jubb al-Dam جب الدم
- Village
- Location of Jubb al-Dam in Syria
- Coordinates: 36.66256°N 37.67917°E
- Country: Syria
- Governorate: Aleppo
- District: Jarabulus
- Subdistrict: Ghandoura

Population (2004)
  - Total: 358

Jubb al-Dam (Arabic: جب الدم; Turkish: Kanlıkuyu) is a village in northern Aleppo Governorate, northern Syria. With 358 inhabitants, as per the 2004 census, Jubb al-Dam administratively belongs to Ghandoura Subdistrict within Jarabulus District. The village is inhabited by Turkmen.
