= Al-Qadi, Jarabulus =

Al-Qadi القاضي
- Village
- Location of al-Qadi in Syria
- Coordinates: 36.72284°N 37.65947°E
- Country: Syria
- Governorate: Aleppo
- District: Jarabulus
- Subdistrict: Ghandoura

Population (2004)
  - Total: 415

Al-Qadi (Arabic: القاضي; Turkish: Kadı) is a village in northern Aleppo Governorate, northern Syria. With 415 inhabitants, as per the 2004 census, al-Qadi administratively belongs to Ghandoura Subdistrict within Jarabulus District. The village is inhabited by Turkmen.
