= Belis, Jarabulus =

Belis بيليس
- Village
- Location of Belis in Syria
- Coordinates: 36.60111°N 37.69708°E
- Country: Syria
- Governorate: Aleppo
- District: Jarabulus
- Subdistrict: Ghandoura

Population (2004)
  - Total: 233

Belis (Arabic: بيليس), is a village in northern Aleppo Governorate, northern Syria. With 233 inhabitants, as per the 2004 census, Belis administratively belongs to Ghandoura Subdistrict within Jarabulus District. The village is inhabited by Turkmen.
