= Qirq Maghar =

- Village
- Location within Syria
- Coordinates: 36.68177°N 38.05321°E
- Country: Syria
- Governorate: Aleppo
- District: Jarabulus
- Time zone: UTC+2 (EET)
  - Summer (DST): UTC+3 (EEST)

Qirq Maghar (Turkish: Kırkmağara, lit. 'forty caves') is a village located 15 kilometers (9.3 mi) south of Jarabulus in northern Syria. It is inhabited by Turkmens of the Barak tribe.
