= Qantara, Jarabulus =

Qantara قنطرة
- Village
- Location of Qantara in Syria
- Coordinates: 36.64337°N 37.72138°E
- Country: Syria
- Governorate: Aleppo
- District: Jarabulus
- Subdistrict: Ghandoura

Population (2004)
  - Total: 254

Qantara (Arabic: قنطرة; Turkish: Kantara) is a village in northern Aleppo Governorate, northern Syria. With 254 inhabitants, as per the 2004 census, Qantara administratively belongs to Ghandoura Subdistrict within Jarabulus District. The village is inhabited by Turkmen.
