= Zugharah, Jarabulus =

Zugharah زوغرة
- Village
- Location of Zugharah in Syria
- Coordinates: 36.75036°N 37.80667°E
- Country: Syria
- Governorate: Aleppo
- District: Jarabulus
- Subdistrict: Jarabulus

Population (2004)
  - Total: 144

Zugharah (Arabic: زوغرة; Turkish: Zügara) is a village in northern Aleppo Governorate, northern Syria. With 144 inhabitants, as per the 2004 census, Zugharah administratively belongs to Jarabulus Subdistrict within Jarabulus District. The village is inhabited by Turkmen.
