= Umm Rutha Tahtani, Jarabulus =

Umm Rutha Tahtani أم روثة تحتاني
- Village
- Location of Umm Rutha Tahtani in Syria
- Coordinates: 36.66275°N 38.06938°E
- Country: Syria
- Governorate: Aleppo
- District: Jarabulus
- Subdistrict: Jarabulus

Population (2004)
  - Total: 306

Umm Rutha Tahtani (Arabic: أم روثة تحتاني) is a village in northern Aleppo Governorate, northern Syria. With 306 inhabitants, as per the 2004 census, Umm Rutha Tahtani administratively belongs to Jarabulus Subdistrict within Jarabulus District. The village is inhabited by Turkmen.
