= Qirata, Jarabulus =

Qirata قيراطة
- Village
- Location of Qirata in Syria
- Coordinates: 36.64950°N 38.05325°E
- Country: Syria
- Governorate: Aleppo
- District: Jarabulus
- Subdistrict: Jarabulus

Population (2004)
  - Total: 1,546

Qirata (Arabic: قيراطة; Turkish: Gırata) is a village in northern Aleppo Governorate, northern Syria. With 1,546 inhabitants, as per the 2004 census, Qirata administratively belongs to Jarabulus Subdistrict within Jarabulus District. The village is inhabited by Turkmens.
