= Dabis =

Dabis may refer to:

- Dabis, Syria, a village in Aleppo Governorate, Syria
- Anna Dabis (1847–1927), German sculptor
- Cherien Dabis (born 1976), American film director

== See also ==
- Abu Dabis, a village in Khuzestan Province, Iran
