= Tal Ali, Jarabulus =

Tal Ali Kerpiçli
- Village
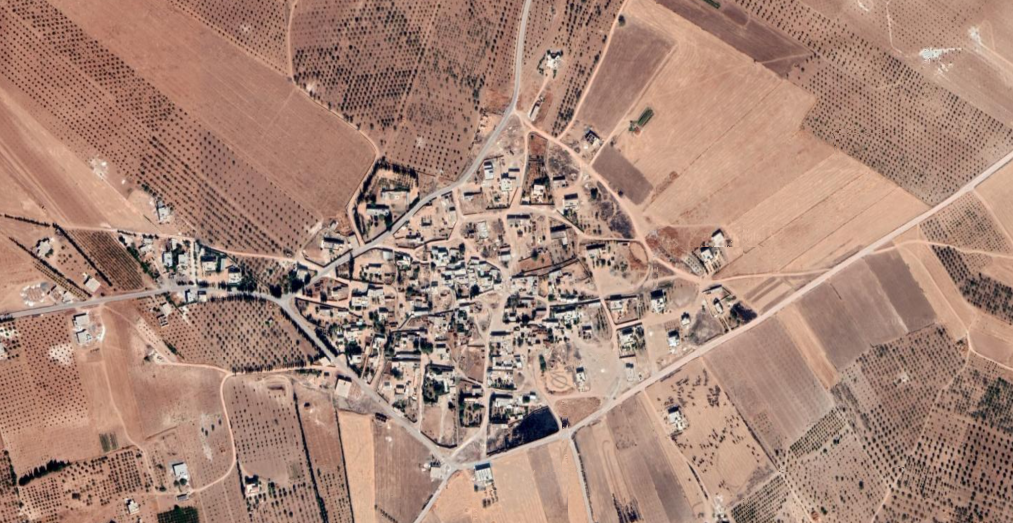
- Tal Ali, Jarabulus

- Location of Umm Rutha Tahtani in Syria
- Coordinates: 36.59856°N 37.73652°E
- Country: Syria
- Governorate: Aleppo
- District: Jarabulus
- Subdistrict: Ghandoura

Population (2004)
  - Total: 367

Tal Ali (Arabic: تل علي), historically Karbajli (Turkish: Kerpiçli, lit. 'adobe'), is a village in northern Aleppo Governorate, northern Syria. With 367 inhabitants, as per the 2004 census, Umm Rutha Tahtani administratively belongs to Ghandoura Subdistrict in Jarabulus District. The village is inhabited by Turkmen.
