= Fursan =

Fursan may refer to:

- Fursan, Syria, village in Aleppo governorate, Syria
- Jash (term), or Fursan, a Kurdish term for a collaborator

== See also ==
- Al Fursan, the UAE air force aerobatics team
