= Districts of Aleppo Governorate (former People's Assembly electoral district) =

Former electoral district of Syria's national legislature

- Former electoral district for the People's Assembly
- Governorate: Aleppo

Former electoral district
- Created: 1973
- Abolished: 2025
- Seats: List: 32 (1990–2025); 25 (1977–1990); 23 (1973–1977)
- Created from: List: Afrin; Al-Bab; Ayn al-Arab; Azaz; Jarabulus; Manbij; Mount Simeon
- Replaced by: List: Afrin; Al-Bab; As-Safira and Dayr Hafir; Atarib; Ayn al-Arab; Azaz; Jarabulus; Manbij

Districts of Aleppo Governorate (Arabic: مناطق محافظة حلب) was an electoral district used to elect members of the Syrian People's Assembly between 1973 and 2025.

== Electoral system ==
The electoral system used to elect the People's Assembly was introduced in 1973 and remained in use until the assembly's dissolution in 2025. Each governorate formed a single, large electoral district, except for Aleppo Governorate, which was divided into two districts: the city of Aleppo and the rural districts of Aleppo Governorate. Within each district, seats were awarded on a block-vote basis, with the candidates receiving the largest number of votes taking all of the seats allocated to it, and the assembly was composed of representatives of two sectors, "workers and peasants" and "other sectors of the people", with the former guaranteed at least half of its seats nationally. The number of seats, and their distribution among districts, was left to the president of the republic to set by decree rather than being fixed in law; the total was raised from 186 to 195 in 1981 and from 195 to 250 in 1990, after which the distribution among the fifteen electoral districts was not changed.

All Syrian citizens aged 18 and over were entitled to vote, other than those under legal guardianship, those with a mental illness affecting their legal capacity, and those convicted of a felony or a "dishonourable" misdemeanour, while serving members of the armed forces and police were barred from voting and from standing as candidates; candidates were further required to be at least 25 years old and to have held Syrian nationality for at least five years, a period raised to ten under the 2011 and 2014 electoral laws. During the 2011 reform of the electoral law, the replacement of this system was discussed because of its weak representativeness, but the large-district, block-vote system was retained; the reform instead moved the administration of elections from the Ministry of Interior and provincial governors to an independent Supreme Judicial Committee for Elections, a structure carried over into a further law passed in 2014 that consolidated the rules for presidential, parliamentary and local-council elections into a single statute.

Beyond being considered unrepresentative — a majoritarian, large-district system of a kind rejected by most electoral systems worldwide — the system has also been criticised for the unevenness of its distribution of seats between governorates. Based on the number of registered voters at the 2012 election, the average was around 59,000 voters per seat nationally, but the ratio varied considerably: about 37,800 voters per seat in Damascus and 51,500 in Tartus, compared with 71,700 in Al-Hasakah and 69,500 in the rural districts of Aleppo Governorate, with no mechanism beyond a presidential decree governing the size of constituencies or the allocation of seats between them.

== Members ==
Elections	MPA (Party)	MPA (Party)	MPA (Party)	MPA (Party)	MPA (Party)	MPA (Party)	MPA (Party)	MPA (Party)	MPA (Party)	MPA (Party)	MPA (Party)	MPA (Party)	MPA (Party)	MPA (Party)	MPA (Party)	MPA (Party)	MPA (Party)	MPA (Party)	MPA (Party)	MPA (Party)	MPA (Party)	MPA (Party)	MPA (Party)	MPA (Party)	MPA (Party)	MPA (Party)	MPA (Party)	MPA (Party)	MPA (Party)	MPA (Party)	MPA (Party)	MPA (Party)
1973	Mustafa Hamush (N/A)	Ahmad Dashu (N/A)	Muhammad Said al-Hakim (N/A)	Hasan al-Ghannam (N/A)	Abd al-Razzaq Abdi (N/A)	Mahmoud al-Jaffal (N/A)	Muhammad Assani (N/A)	Zakariya Ali (N/A)	Muhammad al-Muhammad al-Jasim (N/A)	Diab al-Mashi (Ind.)	Ibrahim Abdul Hanan Zamil (N/A)	Wahid Mustafa (N/A)	Ismail al-Youssefi (N/A)	Abdul Qadir Nana (N/A)	Zakariya al-Darir (N/A)	Muhammad Fahim al-Razuq (N/A)	Muhammad Khayr Alitu (N/A)	Abdullah Dirgham (N/A)	Muhammad Faiq Haj Muhammad Hasan (N/A)	Kanu Ahmad (N/A)	Ismat Ghabari (N/A)	Mahmoud Fayez al-Labni (N/A)	Farouq al-Jasim (N/A)	23 seats								
1977	Muhammad Nour Jneidan (N/A)	Ahmad Tajer (N/A)	Taha al-Ghabash (N/A)	Muhammad Murad (N/A)	Mustafa al-Hajj Mousa (N/A)	Rashid Muhammad (N/A)	Othman Diri (N/A)	Wahid Abu Ras (N/A)	Muhammad al-Muhammad al-Jasim (N/A)	Diab al-Mashi (Ind.)	Hamdo al-Najjar (N/A)	Wahid Mustafa (N/A)	Hammadin Hammadin (N/A)	Muhammad al-Abdallah al-Jumaa (N/A)	Ahmad al-Shihabi (N/A)	Omar al-Ibrahim (N/A)	Ali Hussein al-Ali (N/A)	Ibrahim Othman (N/A)	Khalil al-Khalil (N/A)	Muhammad Fawzi Ibrahim (N/A)	Ismat Ghabari (N/A)	Ahmad Disho (N/A)	Mahmoud Kallou (N/A)	Muhammad Sheikh Ismail (N/A)	Muhammad Hamdi al-Arab (N/A)	25 seats						
1981	Mustafa Hamoush (N/A)	Abd al-Razzaq Abd al-Majid (N/A)	Taha al-Ghabash (N/A)	Muhammad Murad (N/A)	Muhammad Khair Khallu (N/A)	Mahmoud al-Jaffal (N/A)	Ali Attar (N/A)	Wahid Abu Ras (N/A)	Issa al-Zamel (N/A)	Diab al-Mashi (Ind.)	Sobhi Kanno (N/A)	Ahmad Shawqi Kallou (N/A)	Ali al-Ibrahim (N/A)	Hammad al-Qadi (N/A)	Ahmad al-Shihabi (N/A)	Omar al-Ibrahim (N/A)	Battal Battal (N/A)	Ibrahim Othman (N/A)	Abd al-Majid Loulak (N/A)	Ahmad Bakur (N/A)	Ismat Ghabari (N/A)	Ahmad Disho (N/A)	Farouq al-Jasim (N/A)	Mamoun Taloustan (N/A)	Abdallah Shukri (N/A)	25 seats						
1986	Ali Hamadeh (N/A)	Abd al-Razzaq Abd al-Majid (N/A)	Taha al-Ghabash (N/A)	Sami al-Shihabi (N/A)	Abd al-Rahman Nima (N/A)	Jassem al-Ibrahim (N/A)	Ali Attar (N/A)	Wahid Abu Ras (N/A)	Issa al-Zamel (N/A)	Diab al-Mashi (Ind.)	Sobhi Kanno (N/A)	Ahmad Shawqi Kallou (N/A)	Ali al-Ibrahim (N/A)	Muhammad Naji Darwish (N/A)	Ismail al-Nasser (N/A)	Omar al-Ibrahim (N/A)	Battal Battal (N/A)	Ibrahim Othman (N/A)	Abd al-Majid Loulak (N/A)	Rifat Bilal (N/A)	Ismat Ghabari (N/A)	Muhammad al-Hassan (N/A)	Farouq al-Jasim (N/A)	Ahmad al-Said (N/A)	Ahmad Mukhtar (N/A)	25 seats						
1990	Muhammad al-Hussein al-Ibrahim (N/A)	Nur al-Huda Ahmad Khallu (N/A)	Hassan Haji Mahmoud (N/A)	Sami al-Shihabi (N/A)	Abd al-Hamid al-Dibo (N/A)	Jassem al-Ibrahim (N/A)	Muhammad Aqil Hussein Agha (N/A)	Wahid Abu Ras (N/A)	Issa al-Zamel (N/A)	Diab al-Mashi (Ind.)	Muhammad Qazan (N/A)	Othman Suleiman (N/A)	Medhat Mulla Qol Aghasi (N/A)	Hikmat Ibrahim (N/A)	Muhammad Said Youssef (N/A)	Muhammad Rahhal (N/A)	Battal Battal (N/A)	Ibrahim Othman (N/A)	Abd al-Razzaq Hamdou al-Sheihan (N/A)	Mustafa al-Ali (N/A)	Salem Karim al-Hamada (N/A)	Muhammad al-Hassan (N/A)	Abd al-Rahman Nasser (N/A)	Ahmad al-Said (N/A)	Ahmad Issa Muhammad (N/A)	Junaid Tajer (N/A)	Fadel Kanno (N/A)	Youssef Youssef Tarboush (N/A)	Abd al-Hamid al-Ghabari (Ind.)	Abd al-Rahman Aibo (N/A)	Mustafa al-Muhammad (N/A)	Husni Hassan (N/A)
1993 by-election	Muhammad al-Hussein al-Ibrahim (N/A)	Nur al-Huda Ahmad Khallu (N/A)	Hassan Haji Mahmoud (N/A)	Sami al-Shihabi (N/A)	Abd al-Hamid al-Dibo (N/A)	Jassem al-Ibrahim (N/A)	Muhammad Aqil Hussein Agha (N/A)	Wahid Abu Ras (N/A)	Issa al-Zamel (N/A)	Diab al-Mashi (Ind.)	Muhammad Qazan (N/A)	Othman Suleiman (N/A)	Medhat Mulla Qol Aghasi (N/A)	Mahmoud Abd al-Hadi (N/A)	Muhammad Said Youssef (N/A)	Muhammad Rahhal (N/A)	Battal Battal (N/A)	Ibrahim Othman (N/A)	Abd al-Razzaq Hamdou al-Sheihan (N/A)	Mustafa al-Ali (N/A)	Salem Karim al-Hamada (N/A)	Muhammad al-Hassan (N/A)	Abd al-Rahman Nasser (N/A)	Ahmad al-Said (N/A)	Ahmad Issa Muhammad (N/A)	Junaid Tajer (N/A)	Fadel Kanno (N/A)	Youssef Youssef Tarboush (N/A)	Abd al-Hamid al-Ghabari (Ind.)	Abd al-Rahman Aibo (N/A)	Mustafa al-Muhammad (N/A)	Husni Hassan (N/A)
1994	Abd al-Qadir Turka (N/A)	Abd al-Hayy Khalid (N/A)	Zakariya Ridwan Fakhouri (N/A)	Sami al-Shihabi (N/A)	Othman Sheikh Hussein (N/A)	Jassem al-Ibrahim (N/A)	Muhammad al-Sattam (N/A)	Wahid Abu Ras (N/A)	Issa al-Zamel (N/A)	Diab al-Mashi (Ind.)	Zakariya al-Hassan (N/A)	Ahmad Khatib (N/A)	Abdallah Hamra (N/A)	Abdallah al-Shallash (N/A)	Muhammad Nour Jneidan (N/A)	Husni Hussein Haj Hamada (N/A)	Battal Battal (N/A)	Fatinah al-Ahmad (N/A)	Manar Nattour (N/A)	Tariq Qandil (N/A)	Abd al-Rahman Abrik (N/A)	Muhammad al-Hassan (N/A)	Muhammad Ismat Omar (N/A)	Ahmad al-Said (N/A)	Abd al-Fattah Makhlouf (N/A)	Tariq Marai (N/A)	Fadel Kanno (N/A)	Aql al-Ibrahim (N/A)	Abd al-Hamid al-Ghabari (Ind.)	Muhammad Ibrahim (N/A)	Muhammad Mamoun Taloustan (N/A)	N/A
1998	Muhammad Qaraa (N/A)	Muhammad Jamal Hassou (N/A)	Fawzia Safou (N/A)	Sami al-Shihabi (N/A)	Abd al-Fattah Omar (N/A)	Nouri al-Arif (N/A)	Muhammad al-Sattam (N/A)	Ismat Mahalli (Ba'ath)	Ahmad al-Hussein (N/A)	Diab al-Mashi (Ind.)	Ali al-Salem (N/A)	Muhammad al-Bish (N/A)	Ibrahim Houri (N/A)	Abd al-Qadir Nanaa (N/A)	Khalil al-Safouk (N/A)	Ahmad Haji Mahmoud (Ba'ath)	Muhammad Gharib (N/A)	Fatinah al-Ahmad (N/A)	Manar Nattour (N/A)	Muhammad Said Said (N/A)	Ahmad Haj Suleiman (Ba'ath)	Muhammad al-Hassan (N/A)	Muhammad Nawras al-Razzouq (N/A)	Ahmad al-Said (N/A)	Ali al-Zwein (Ba'ath)	Naeem al-Alawi (N/A)	Kamal Al Ammo (Ind.)	Abd al-Hadi al-Jammal (N/A)	Abd al-Hamid al-Ghabari (Ind.)	Alaa al-Din Shaheima (N/A)	Muhammad Melhem (N/A)	Muhammad Naasan (N/A)
1999 by-election	Muhammad Qaraa (N/A)	Muhammad Jamal Hassou (N/A)	Fawzia Safou (N/A)	Sami al-Shihabi (N/A)	Abd al-Fattah Omar (N/A)	Nouri al-Arif (N/A)	Muhammad al-Sattam (N/A)	Ismat Mahalli (Ba'ath)	Ahmad al-Hussein (N/A)	Diab al-Mashi (Ind.)	Ali al-Salem (N/A)	Muhammad al-Bish (N/A)	Ibrahim Houri (N/A)	Abd al-Qadir Nanaa (N/A)	Khalil al-Safouk (N/A)	Ahmad Haji Mahmoud (Ba'ath)	Muhammad Gharib (N/A)	Fatinah al-Ahmad (N/A)	Manar Nattour (N/A)	Muhammad Said Said (N/A)	Ahmad Haj Suleiman (Ba'ath)	Muhammad al-Hassan (N/A)	Muhammad Nawras al-Razzouq (N/A)	Ahmad al-Said (N/A)	Ali al-Zwein (Ba'ath)	Naeem al-Alawi (N/A)	Kamal Al Ammo (Ind.)	Abd al-Hadi al-Jammal (N/A)	Abd al-Hamid al-Ghabari (Ind.)	Muhammad Sameh Jazmati (N/A)	Muhammad Melhem (N/A)	Muhammad Naasan (N/A)
2003	Muhammad Hassan Rashid (N/A)	Muhammad Jamal Hassou (N/A)	Badriya Sheihan (N/A)	Muhammad Hilal (N/A)	Mustafa al-Oweid (Ba'ath)	Abdo Assaf (N/A)	Muhammad al-Sattam (N/A)	Ismat Mahalli (Ba'ath)	Hassan Taleb (N/A)	Diab al-Mashi (Ind.)	Aqil al-Alawi (Ba'ath)	Muhammad al-Bish (N/A)	Eid Muhammad (N/A)	Abd al-Qadir Nanaa (N/A)	Khalil al-Safouk (N/A)	Ahmad Haji Mahmoud (Ba'ath)	Muhammad Asaad al-Asaad (N/A)	Fatinah al-Ahmad (N/A)	Hassan Salloum (Ba'ath)	Abidin Arabo (N/A)	Ahmad Haj Suleiman (Ba'ath)	Riad Haj Hassan (N/A)	Abdullah Sallum Abdullah (SUP)	Sawsan Hudhaifa (N/A)	Nasser Qaddour (N/A)	Ahmad Munir Muhammad (Ba'ath)	Ridwan al-Habib (Ba'ath)	Abd al-Hadi al-Jammal (N/A)	Ismat Ghabari (N/A)	Muhammad Safwan Khallou (N/A)	Muhammad Melhem (N/A)	Muhammad Naasan (N/A)
2007	Ahmad al-Abed (Ba'ath)	Riad Khallou (Ba'ath)	Muhammad al-Muhammad (Ba'ath)	Yahya Taleb (SUP)	Mustafa al-Oweid (Ba'ath)	Ikhlas Badawi (Ba'ath)	Muhammad al-Ali (Ba'ath)	Ismat Mahalli (Ba'ath)	Hussein Hassoun (Ba'ath)	Diab al-Mashi (Ind.)	Aqil al-Alawi (Ba'ath)	Ziad Mohsen (Ba'ath)	Kamal Al Ammo (Ind.)	Aql al-Ibrahim (Ind.)	Hussein al-Haj Hamada (Ind.)	Ahmad Haji Mahmoud (Ba'ath)	Fahmi al-Hassan (Ind.)	Abdo Muhammad (Ba'ath)	Hassan Salloum (Ba'ath)	Muhammad Dib (Ba'ath)	Ahmad Haj Suleiman (Ba'ath)	Mahmoud Youssef (Ba'ath)	Ali al-Zwein (Ba'ath)	Muhammad Nafeh Bouzan (SCP-B)	Farouk Haj Ali al-Jassem (Ind.)	Ahmad Munir Muhammad (Ba'ath)	Ridwan al-Habib (Ba'ath)	Abd al-Qadir Shahada (Ind.)	Khalil al-Ubayd (Ind.)	Muhammad Shaheen (Ind.)	Abd al-Hamid al-Ghabari (Ind.)	Muhammad Jumaa (Ind.)
2009 by-election	Ahmad al-Abed (Ba'ath)	Riad Khallou (Ba'ath)	Muhammad al-Muhammad (Ba'ath)	Yahya Taleb (SUP)	Mustafa al-Oweid (Ba'ath)	Ikhlas Badawi (Ba'ath)	Muhammad al-Ali (Ba'ath)	Ismat Mahalli (Ba'ath)	Hussein Hassoun (Ba'ath)	Muhammad Khair al-Mashi (Ind.)	Aqil al-Alawi (Ba'ath)	Ziad Mohsen (Ba'ath)	Kamal Al Ammo (Ind.)	Aql al-Ibrahim (Ind.)	Hussein al-Haj Hamada (Ind.)	Ahmad Haji Mahmoud (Ba'ath)	Fahmi al-Hassan (Ind.)	Abdo Muhammad (Ba'ath)	Hassan Salloum (Ba'ath)	Muhammad Dib (Ba'ath)	Ahmad Haj Suleiman (Ba'ath)	Mahmoud Youssef (Ba'ath)	Ali al-Zwein (Ba'ath)	Muhammad Nafeh Bouzan (SCP-B)	Farouk Haj Ali al-Jassem (Ind.)	Ahmad Munir Muhammad (Ba'ath)	Ridwan al-Habib (Ba'ath)	Abd al-Qadir Shahada (Ind.)	Khalil al-Ubayd (Ind.)	Muhammad Shaheen (Ind.)	Abd al-Hamid al-Ghabari (Ind.)	Muhammad Jumaa (Ind.)
2012	Jamal al-Din Abdo (PWP)	Ahmad Saleh Ibrahim (Ba'ath)	Hassan Khallo (Ba'ath)	Hussein Jassim Hamad (Ba'ath)	Abdullah al-Hamad (Ba'ath)	Ikhlas Badawi (Ba'ath)	Ali al-Bish (Ba'ath)	Ali al-Ali al-Abdo al-Satouf (Ba'ath)	Hussein Hassoun (Ba'ath)	Muhammad Khair al-Mashi (Ind.)	Eid al-Khalawi (Ba'ath)	Qassem Hassan (Ba'ath)	Marai al-Taama (Ba'ath)	Aql al-Ibrahim (Ind.)	Mustafa al-Jader (Ba'ath)	Maen Assaf (Ba'ath)	Fahmi al-Hassan (Ind.)	Ahmad al-Ali al-Hamra (Ind.)	Abdallah al-Shallash (Ind.)	Nasr al-Haj Junaid (Ind.)	Mustafa Ammar Kush (Arab Socialist Movement)	Ibrahim al-Haj Muhammad Ali (Ba'ath)	Shaheen Naasan (Ba'ath)	Shams al-Din al-Shaddad (Ba'ath)	Alia Qabbani (Ba'ath)	Omar Mahmoud al-Hamdo (Ba'ath)	Muhammad Arabo (Ba'ath)	Muhammad Fadi al-Quraan (Ba'ath)	Abdullah Abdullah (SUP)	Ismail al-Hassan al-Rabee (Ind.)	Mujib al-Rahman al-Dandan (Ind.)	Muhammad Saleh al-Mashi (Ind.)
2012 by-election	Jamal al-Din Abdo (PWP)	Ahmad Saleh Ibrahim (Ba'ath)	Hassan Khallo (Ba'ath)	Hussein Jassim Hamad (Ba'ath)	Abdullah al-Hamad (Ba'ath)	Muhammad Deeb (Ba'ath)	Abdel Wahhab al-Abd al-Hanan (Ba'ath)	Ali al-Ali al-Abdo al-Satouf (Ba'ath)	Hussein Hassoun (Ba'ath)	Muhammad Khair al-Mashi (Ind.)	Eid al-Khalawi (Ba'ath)	Qassem Hassan (Ba'ath)	Marai al-Taama (Ba'ath)	Aql al-Ibrahim (Ind.)	Mustafa al-Jader (Ba'ath)	Maen Assaf (Ba'ath)	Fahmi al-Hassan (Ind.)	Ahmad al-Ali al-Hamra (Ind.)	Abdallah al-Shallash (Ind.)	Nasr al-Haj Junaid (Ind.)	Mustafa Ammar Kush (Arab Socialist Movement)	Ibrahim al-Haj Muhammad Ali (Ba'ath)	Shaheen Naasan (Ba'ath)	Shams al-Din al-Shaddad (Ba'ath)	Alia Qabbani (Ba'ath)	Omar Mahmoud al-Hamdo (Ba'ath)	Muhammad Arabo (Ba'ath)	Muhammad Fadi al-Quraan (Ba'ath)	Abdullah Abdullah (SUP)	Ismail al-Hassan al-Rabee (Ind.)	Mujib al-Rahman al-Dandan (Ind.)	Muhammad Saleh al-Mashi (Ind.)
2015 by-election	Jamal al-Din Abdo (PWP)	Ahmad Saleh Ibrahim (Ba'ath)	Hassan Khallo (Ba'ath)	Hussein Jassim Hamad (Ba'ath)	Abdullah al-Hamad (Ba'ath)	Muhammad Deeb (Ba'ath)	Abdel Wahhab al-Abd al-Hanan (Ba'ath)	Ali al-Ali al-Abdo al-Satouf (Ba'ath)	Hussein Hassoun (Ba'ath)	Muhammad Khair al-Mashi (Ind.)	Eid al-Khalawi (Ba'ath)	Qassem Hassan (Ba'ath)	Marai al-Taama (Ba'ath)	Aql al-Ibrahim (Ind.)	Mustafa al-Jader (Ba'ath)	Maen Assaf (Ba'ath)	Fahmi al-Hassan (Ind.)	Ahmad al-Ali al-Hamra (Ind.)	Fares Jneidan (Ind.)	Nasr al-Haj Junaid (Ind.)	Mustafa Ammar Kush (Arab Socialist Movement)	Ibrahim al-Haj Muhammad Ali (Ba'ath)	Shaheen Naasan (Ba'ath)	Shams al-Din al-Shaddad (Ba'ath)	Alia Qabbani (Ba'ath)	Omar Mahmoud al-Hamdo (Ba'ath)	Omar al-Aroub (Ba'ath)	Abd al-Razzaq Barakat (Ba'ath)	Abdullah Abdullah (SUP)	Ismail al-Hassan al-Rabee (Ind.)	Mujib al-Rahman al-Dandan (Ind.)	Muhammad Saleh al-Mashi (Ind.)
2016	Joumana Abu Shaar (Ba'ath)	Muhammad al-Hazwari (Ba'ath)	Suhail Abdallah (Ba'ath)	Hussein Jassim Hamad (Ba'ath)	Ali al-Zeidan (Ba'ath)	Fadel Kaadeh (Ba'ath)	Muhammad Fawaz (Ba'ath)	Ali al-Ali al-Abdo al-Satouf (Ba'ath)	Hussein Hassoun (Ba'ath)	Hussein al-Jumaa Lahaj Qasem (Ind.)	Eid al-Khalawi (Ba'ath)	Qassem Hassan (Ba'ath)	Obeid al-Obeid al-Issa (Ind.)	Omar al-Hassan (Until 2020 and from 2024: Ind. 2020–2024: Ba'ath)	Ahmad Marai (SSNP)	Alan Bakr (Ba'ath)	Fahmi al-Hassan (Ind.)	Ahmad al-Ali al-Hamra (Ind.)	Fares Jneidan (Ind.)	Abdallah Haji Wardi (Ba'ath)	Ali Khalil Bashar (Ba'ath)	Ali Ali al-Mustafa (Ba'ath)	Fahd Amin (Ba'ath)	Muhammad al-Batran (Ba'ath)	Manal al-Sheikh Amin (Ba'ath)	Omar Mahmoud al-Hamdo (Ba'ath)	Omar al-Aroub (Ba'ath)	Abd al-Razzaq Barakat (Ba'ath)	Nasser Karim (Ba'ath)	Khaldoun Oweis Oweis (Ind.)	Mujib al-Rahman al-Dandan (Ind.)	Hassan Shahid (Ind.)
2017 by-election	Joumana Abu Shaar (Ba'ath)	Ahmad Saleh Ibrahim (Ba'ath)	Suhail Abdallah (Ba'ath)	Hussein Jassim Hamad (Ba'ath)	Ali al-Zeidan (Ba'ath)	Fadel Kaadeh (Ba'ath)	Muhammad Fawaz (Ba'ath)	Ali al-Ali al-Abdo al-Satouf (Ba'ath)	Hussein Hassoun (Ba'ath)	Hussein al-Jumaa Lahaj Qasem (Ind.)	Eid al-Khalawi (Ba'ath)	Qassem Hassan (Ba'ath)	Obeid al-Obeid al-Issa (Ind.)	Omar al-Hassan (Until 2020 and from 2024: Ind. 2020–2024: Ba'ath)	Ahmad Marai (SSNP)	Alan Bakr (Ba'ath)	Qadri al-Hassan (Ind.)	Ahmad al-Ali al-Hamra (Ind.)	Fares Jneidan (Ind.)	Abdallah Haji Wardi (Ba'ath)	Ali Khalil Bashar (Ba'ath)	Ali Ali al-Mustafa (Ba'ath)	Fahd Amin (Ba'ath)	Muhammad al-Batran (Ba'ath)	Manal al-Sheikh Amin (Ba'ath)	Omar Mahmoud al-Hamdo (Ba'ath)	Omar al-Aroub (Ba'ath)	Abd al-Razzaq Barakat (Ba'ath)	Nasser Karim (Ba'ath)	Khaldoun Oweis Oweis (Ind.)	Mujib al-Rahman al-Dandan (Ind.)	Hassan Shahid (Ind.)
2019 by-election	Joumana Abu Shaar (Ba'ath)	Ahmad Saleh Ibrahim (Ba'ath)	Suhail Abdallah (Ba'ath)	Hussein Jassim Hamad (Ba'ath)	Ahmad al-Zeidan (Ba'ath)	Fadel Kaadeh (Ba'ath)	Muhammad Fawaz (Ba'ath)	Ali al-Ali al-Abdo al-Satouf (Ba'ath)	Hussein Hassoun (Ba'ath)	Hussein al-Jumaa Lahaj Qasem (Ind.)	Eid al-Khalawi (Ba'ath)	Qassem Hassan (Ba'ath)	Obeid al-Obeid al-Issa (Ind.)	Omar al-Hassan (Until 2020 and from 2024: Ind. 2020–2024: Ba'ath)	Ahmad Marai (SSNP)	Alan Bakr (Ba'ath)	Qadri al-Hassan (Ind.)	Ahmad al-Ali al-Hamra (Ind.)	Fares Jneidan (Ind.)	Abdallah Haji Wardi (Ba'ath)	Ali Khalil Bashar (Ba'ath)	Ali Ali al-Mustafa (Ba'ath)	Fahd Amin (Ba'ath)	Muhammad al-Batran (Ba'ath)	Manal al-Sheikh Amin (Ba'ath)	Omar Mahmoud al-Hamdo (Ba'ath)	Omar al-Aroub (Ba'ath)	Abd al-Razzaq Barakat (Ba'ath)	Nasser Karim (Ba'ath)	Khaldoun Oweis Oweis (Ind.)	Mujib al-Rahman al-Dandan (Ind.)	Hassan Shahid (Ind.)
2020	Qusay al-Thaljah (Ba'ath)	Ahmad Saleh Ibrahim (Ba'ath)	Faten Muhammad (Ba'ath)	Hussein Jassim Hamad (Ba'ath)	Ahmad al-Zeidan (Ba'ath)	Fadel Kaadeh (Ba'ath)	Muhammad Fawaz (Ba'ath)	Khaled al-Shbeib (Ba'ath)	Muhammad al-Asaad (Ba'ath)	Muhammad Khair al-Mashi (Ind.)	Nasr Abdallah (Ba'ath)	Qassem Hassan (Ba'ath)	Obeid al-Obeid al-Issa (Ind.)	Omar al-Hassan (Until 2020 and from 2024: Ind. 2020–2024: Ba'ath)	Ahmad Marai (SSNP)	Alan Bakr (Ba'ath)	Muhammad Jibrayel (Ba'ath)	Ahmad al-Ali al-Hamra (Ind.)	Fares Jneidan (Ind.)	Hussein Hasan al-Jumaah (Ind.)	Muhammad Subhi Sheikh al-Daia (Ind.)	Taha al-Hajj Ali (Ba'ath)	Eid al-Sweis (Ba'ath)	Abd al-Latif al-Bakkar (Ba'ath)	Manal al-Sheikh Amin (Ba'ath)	Omar Mahmoud al-Hamdo (Ba'ath)	Abd al-Aziz al-Assaf (Ba'ath)	Abd al-Razzaq Barakat (Ba'ath)	Adnan al-Muhammad (Ba'ath)	Adnan al-Hamad (Ind.)	Mujib al-Rahman al-Dandan (Ind.)	Hassan Shahid (Ind.)
2022 by-election	Qusay al-Thaljah (Ba'ath)	Ahmad Saleh Ibrahim (Ba'ath)	Faten Muhammad (Ba'ath)	Hussein Jassim Hamad (Ba'ath)	Ahmad al-Zeidan (Ba'ath)	Adnan Shahadeh (Ba'ath)	Muhammad Fawaz (Ba'ath)	Khaled al-Shbeib (Ba'ath)	Muhammad al-Asaad (Ba'ath)	Muhammad Khair al-Mashi (Ind.)	Nasr Abdallah (Ba'ath)	Qassem Hassan (Ba'ath)	Obeid al-Obeid al-Issa (Ind.)	Omar al-Hassan (Until 2020 and from 2024: Ind. 2020–2024: Ba'ath)	Ahmad Marai (SSNP)	Alan Bakr (Ba'ath)	Muhammad Jibrayel (Ba'ath)	Ahmad al-Ali al-Hamra (Ind.)	Fares Jneidan (Ind.)	Hussein Hasan al-Jumaah (Ind.)	Muhammad Subhi Sheikh al-Daia (Ind.)	Taha al-Hajj Ali (Ba'ath)	Eid al-Sweis (Ba'ath)	Abd al-Latif al-Bakkar (Ba'ath)	Manal al-Sheikh Amin (Ba'ath)	Omar Mahmoud al-Hamdo (Ba'ath)	Abd al-Aziz al-Assaf (Ba'ath)	Abd al-Razzaq Barakat (Ba'ath)	Adnan al-Muhammad (Ba'ath)	Adnan al-Hamad (Ind.)	Mujib al-Rahman al-Dandan (Ind.)	Hassan Shahid (Ind.)
2024	Qusay al-Thaljah (Ba'ath)	Qais al-Muhammad (Ba'ath)	Saba Shalo (Ba'ath)	Sheikh Ibrahim al-Bakkouri (Ba'ath)	Ahmad al-Zeidan (Ba'ath)	Nawal al-Areef (Ba'ath)	Mustafa al-Marii (Ba'ath)	Hussein al-Hammadin (Ba'ath)	Hussein Hassoun (Ba'ath)	Muhammad Khair al-Mashi (Ind.)	Salah al-Ali (Ba'ath)	Qassem Hassan (Ba'ath)	Obeid al-Obeid al-Issa (Ind.)	Omar al-Hassan (Until 2020 and from 2024: Ind. 2020–2024: Ba'ath)	Yasser Kaadeh (Ba'ath)	Alan Bakr (Ba'ath)	Muhammad al-Hassan al-Rabee (Ba'ath)	Jibran al-Jomaa (Ba'ath)	Fares Jneidan (Ind.)	Abdul-Hakim al-Wardah (Ba'ath)	Muhammad Subhi Sheikh al-Daia (Ind.)	Taha al-Hajj Ali (Ba'ath)	Eid al-Sweis (Ba'ath)	Muhammad Abdullah (SCP-B)	Raslan al-Ali al-Raslan (Ind.)	Abd al-Ilah al-Abdou (Ind.)	Abd al-Aziz al-Assaf (Ba'ath)	Abd al-Razzaq Barakat (Ba'ath)	Muhammad Nizar Darwish Meido (Ind.)	Adnan al-Hamad (Ind.)	Mujib al-Rahman al-Dandan (Ind.)	Maalla al-Khader (Ba'ath)
2024 by-election	Qusay al-Thaljah (Ba'ath)	Qais al-Muhammad (Ba'ath)	Saba Shalo (Ba'ath)	Sheikh Ibrahim al-Bakkouri (Ba'ath)	Ahmad al-Zeidan (Ba'ath)	Nawal al-Areef (Ba'ath)	Mustafa al-Marii (Ba'ath)	Hussein al-Hammadin (Ba'ath)	Hussein Hassoun (Ba'ath)	Vacant (Note: By-elections were cancelled. See 2024 by-election.)	Salah al-Ali (Ba'ath)	Qassem Hassan (Ba'ath)	Obeid al-Obeid al-Issa (Ind.)	Omar al-Hassan (Until 2020 and from 2024: Ind. 2020–2024: Ba'ath)	Yasser Kaadeh (Ba'ath)	Alan Bakr (Ba'ath)	Muhammad al-Hassan al-Rabee (Ba'ath)	Jibran al-Jomaa (Ba'ath)	Fares Jneidan (Ind.)	Abdul-Hakim al-Wardah (Ba'ath)	Muhammad Subhi Sheikh al-Daia (Ind.)	Taha al-Hajj Ali (Ba'ath)	Eid al-Sweis (Ba'ath)	Muhammad Abdullah (SCP-B)	Raslan al-Ali al-Raslan (Ind.)	Abd al-Ilah al-Abdou (Ind.)	Abd al-Aziz al-Assaf (Ba'ath)	Abd al-Razzaq Barakat (Ba'ath)	Muhammad Nizar Darwish Meido (Ind.)	Adnan al-Hamad (Ind.)	Mujib al-Rahman al-Dandan (Ind.)	Maalla al-Khader (Ba'ath)
