= Ghandoura =

Ghandoura غندورة
- Town
- Location of Ghandoura in Syria
- Coordinates: 36°40′10″N 37°43′57″E
- Country: Syria
- Governorate: Aleppo
- District: Jarabulus
- Subdistrict: Ghandoura
- Control: Turkey (Syrian opposition) Syrian Interim Government

Population (2004)
  - Total: 1,658
- Time zone: UTC+2 (EET)
  - Summer (DST): UTC+3 (EEST)
- Geocode: C2250

Ghandoura (Arabic: غندورة, romanized: Gandūra; Turkish: Gındıra) is a town in northern Aleppo Governorate, northwestern Syria. Administrative center of Nahiya Ghandoura in Jarabulus District, the town is inhabited by Sunni Arabs and had a population of 1,658 as per the 2004 census. It is located midway between Al-Rai and Jarabulus, at the northern banks of Sajur River, some 4 km (2.5 mi) south east of the Sajur Dam.

Ghandoura is the administrative center of Nahiya Ghandoura of the Jarabulus District.

== Syrian Civil War ==
During the civil war, the city, as well as the subdistrict fell under control of ISIS leading many civilians in the area seeking asylum primarily in Türkiye. On 28 July 2016, US airstrikes killed at least 28 civilians, mostly women and including seven children in Ghandoura.. Turkish armed forces, in collaboration with local FSA forces took control of the town in 2016 during the Euphrates Shield operation and the control of the town was transferred to Syrian Transitional Counsil after the fall of the regime.
