= Kayacık Dam =

Dam

- Location within Turkey
- Location: Gaziantep Province, Turkey
- Coordinates: 36.8231°N 37.5683°E
- Construction began: 1993
- Opening date: 2005
- Operator: State Hydraulic Works

Dam and spillways
- Impounds: Ayfinar Deresi
- Height: 45 metres (148 ft)
- Dam volume: 1,853,000 m^{3} (65,400,000 cu ft)

Reservoir
- Total capacity: 0.117 km^{3} (0.028 cu mi)
- Surface area: 11 km^{2} (4.2 sq mi)

The Kayacık Dam impounds the Ayfinar Deresi, one of the two streams that join south of Gaziantep to form the Sajur River. It is located in Gaziantep Province, Turkey. The dam was constructed between 1993 and 2005 as part of the Southeastern Anatolia Project (Turkish: Güneydoğu Anadolu Projesi, or GAP). It is 45 metres (148 ft) high and has a volume of 1,853,000 cubic metres (65,400,000 cu ft). The reservoir created by the Kayacık Dam has a surface area of 11 square kilometres (4.2 sq mi) and a volume of 0.117 cubic kilometres (0.028 cu mi) and is used to irrigate an area of 200 square kilometres (77 sq mi).

== See also ==
- List of dams and reservoirs in Turkey
