= Farhad Shahin =

- فرهاد أنور شاهين

Member of the People's Assembly
- Incumbent
- Assumed office 24 May 2026
- Constituency: Ayn al-Arab

Personal details
- Party: Kurdistan Democratic Party of Syria
- Other political affiliations: Kurdish National Council

Farhad Anwar Shahin (Arabic: فرهاد أنور شاهين) is a Syrian politician and lawyer who has served as member of the People's Assembly since 24 May 2026. A member of the Kurdistan Democratic Party of Syria, he has served as a member of its political bureau.
