= Osama an-Na'ous =

Syrian activist and politician (born 1980)

- أسامة الناؤوس

Member of the People's Assembly
- Incumbent
- Assumed office 12 July 2026
- Constituency: al-Bab

Personal details
- Born: Osama Ahmad al-Na'ous; 1980 (age 45–46) al-Bab, Syria
- Party: Independent
- Education: University of Aleppo

Osama Ahmad al-Na'ous (Arabic: أسامة أحمد النعوس; born 1980) is a Syrian businessman, activist and politician who has served as a member of the People's Assembly for the constituency of al-Bab since October 2025. Before entering parliament, he was an early participant in the Syrian protest movement in al-Bab and a founding member of the city's revolutionary coordination committee.

== Biography ==
Al-Na'ous was born in the city of al-Bab, Aleppo Governorate, in 1980. He graduated from the Engineering Technical Institute of the University of Aleppo in 2001. Following his compulsory military service, he worked in commerce and private business activities. Before the outbreak of the Syrian revolution, he resided for a period in Saudi Arabia.

Following the outbreak of protests in Syria in 2011, al-Na'ous returned to the country and became involved in the anti-government protest movement in al-Bab. He was among the founders of the al-Bab Coordination Committee, established in the spring of 2011 to organize demonstrations and civil activism in the city. In June 2011 he was arrested by Syrian security authorities because of his political activities. After his release, he continued his involvement in the revolutionary movement in al-Bab and later participated in civilian relief and medical efforts during the conflict.

Following the fall of the Assad regime in December 2024, al-Na'ous stood as a candidate in the 2025 parliamentary election representing the constituency of al-Bab, the eastern Aleppo countryside.
