= Omar Gharibo =

- عمر غريبو

Member of the People's Assembly
- Incumbent
- Assumed office 12 July 2026
- Constituency: As-Safira and Dayr Hafir

Personal details
- Born: 1976 (age 49–50) Tell Aran, Syria

Omar Hamdo Gharibo (Arabic: عمر غريبو); is a Syrian Kurdish politician who has served as member of the People's Assembly since 5 October 2025.

== Biography ==
Gharibo born in 1982 and originates from Tell Aran, Aleppo Governorate.

He holds a bachelor's degree in Sharia from Damascus University and a master’s degree in political science and international relations from Hasan Kalyoncu Üniversitesi in Turkey.

Before the Syrian revolution, he was detained by the Assad regime for nearly three years.

Then he founded a revolutionary battalion in the Tell Aran area in 2013 and served as the first chairman of the Revolutionary Local Council, in addition to serving as a member of the General Assembly of the Free Aleppo Provincial Council.

After the fall of the Assad regime, he ran for the new People’s Assembly as a representative of the Al-Safira and Deir Hafer district, and his victory in the election was announced on October 6, 2025.

== Political Position ==
One of his policy goals is enshrining the Kurdish language within the Syrian constitution.
