= Ghandoura Subdistrict =

Ghandoura Subdistrict ناحية غندورة
- Subdistrict
- Location of Ghandoura Subdistrict within Aleppo Governorate

- Location in Syria
- Country: Syria
- Governorate: Aleppo
- District: Jarabulus
- Seat: Ghandoura
- Control: Turkey (Syrian opposition) Syrian Interim Government

Area
  - Total: 290.95 km^{2} (112.34 sq mi)

Population (2004)
  - Total: 17,314
  - Density: 59.509/km^{2} (154.13/sq mi)
- Geocode: SY020801

Ghandoura Subdistrict (Arabic: ناحية غندورة) is a subdistrict of Jarabulus District in northern Aleppo Governorate, northwestern Syria. The administrative centre is the town of Ghandoura.

At the 2004 census, the subdistrict had a population of 17,314.

== Towns and villages ==
Towns and villages of Ghandoura Subdistrict
PCode	Name	Population
C2259	as-Suwaydah	2,304
C2250	Ghandoura	1,658
C2263	Qubbat at-Turkuman	1,186
C2266	Ganamah	1,074
C2253	Sheib	984
C2248	Sheineh	924
C2256	Arab Hasan Saghir	914
C2244	Tal Elhajar - Tal Elahamar	669
C2255	Sabuniyeh	666
C2247	Kuliyeh	590
C2252	Fursan	565
C2257	Thaheriya, Jarablus	480
C2268	Lilawa	473
C2260	Tal Aghbar	442
C2242	Arab Azzah	417
C2254	Qadi, Jarablus	415
C2243	Hfeira	389
C2245	Tal Ali	367
C2262	Jeb Eldam, Jarablus	358
C2249	Hajar Elabyad	351
C2258	Hmeireh - Ashkaji	333
C2251	Ghassaniyeh, Jarablus	331
—N/a	Thalija	256
C2267	Qantara Kabira	254
C2261	Shahid	237
C2246	Bilis	233
—N/a	al-Mudallila	223
C2265	Mortafaa Kabira	122
C2264	Nabgha Kabira	99
