= Jarabulus Subdistrict =

Jarabulus Subdistrict ناحية جرابلس
- Subdistrict
- Location of Jarabulus Subdistrict within Aleppo Governorate

- Location in Syria
- Country: Syria
- Governorate: Aleppo
- District: Jarabulus District
- Seat: Jarabulus
- Control: Turkey (Syrian opposition) Syrian Interim Government

Area
  - Total: 316.52 km^{2} (122.21 sq mi)

Population (2004)
  - Total: 41,575
  - Density: 131.35/km^{2} (340.20/sq mi)
- Geocode: SY020800

Jarabulus Subdistrict (Arabic: ناحية مركز جرابلس) is a subdistrict of Jarabulus District in Aleppo Governorate of northern Syria. The administrative centre is the city of Jarabulus.

At the 2004 census, the subdistrict had a population of 41,575.

== Cities, towns and villages ==
Cities, towns and villages of Jarabulus Subdistrict
PCode	Name	Population
C2227	Jarabulus	11,570
C2226	Jarabulus Tahtani	2,170
C2224	al-Jamel	2,091
C2235	Tukhar Kabir	1,832
C2238	Marma al-Hajar	1,818
C2229	Haymar	1,749
C2237	Qiratah	1,546
C2214	al-Haluwaniyah	1,523
C2230	Suraysat	1,517
C2221	Zahr al-Magharah	1,376
C2225	Umm Ruthah Fawqani	1,371
C2236	Yusuf Bayk	1,138
C2233	Ayn al-Bayda	1,111
C2218	Magharah	1,054
C2213	Amarnah	1,050
C2240	Mazaalah	987
C2241	Qandariyah	888
C2217	Dabis	880
C2232	Mahsanli	807
C2219	Halwanji	763
—N/a	al-Bir Fawqani	618
C2215	al-Hajalieh	574
C2239	Majra Saghir	565
C2222	Turaykham	488
C2231	Hadrah	477
—N/a	Jubb al-Kusa	417
C2223	Umm Rutha Tahtani	306
C2228	Umm Susah	288
—N/a	Balaban	227
C2216	al-Bir Tahtani	179
C2220	Zughrah	144
—N/a	Jab Jarawa	51
