= Manbij Plain =

Coordinates: 36°34′17″N 37°56′36″E

Manbij plain (Arabic: سهل منبج [sæhl ˈmænbid͡ʒ]) is a vast plain on the eastern Aleppo plateau in northern Syria and southeastern Turkey. The plain runs along the western bank of river Euphrates for approximately 140 km from Nizip to Maskanah, with an average width of 15–30 km. It is located within the Manbij and Jarābulus districts of Aleppo Governorate in Syria, and the Nizip and Karkamış districts of Gaziantep Province in Turkey.

== Borders and description ==
The average elevation of the plain is around 400 m. It gradually slopes up from east to west. The plain can be divided into northern and southern parts. The northern part extends from Nizip to Manbij. This part is surrounded by the Aintab plateau from north and west. It is traversed from west to east by the Nizip, Merzimen (Bozatlı), and Sajur rivers. It is inhabited by a Turkmen density in addition to Arabs and other ethnic minorities. The Turkmen call this plain Barak plain after the name of a local Turkmen tribe. In Syria it is called the northern Manbij plain.

The southern plain extends from Manbij to Maskanah. It is bounded from west by the Dhahab valley and Lake Jabboul. In the south it is joined by the arid steppe of the northern Syrian Desert.

Irrigation based agriculture has been practiced in the plain since ancient times. Archeological remains from the Paleolithic have been discovered in the Sajur valley. The ancient Zeugma on the Euphrates is found in the northern end of the plain.

== See also ==
- Aleppo Governorate

== Sources ==
- Besançon, Jacques; Sanlaville, Paul (1985), "Le milieu géographique", in Sanlaville, Paul (ed.), Holocene settlement in north Syria: résultats de deux prospections archéologiques effectuées dans la région du nahr Sajour et sur le haut Euphrate syrien, BAR International Series (in French), vol. 328, Oxford: B.A.R., pp. 7–40, ISBN 0-86054-307-2
