= Jarabulus =

Jarabulus جَرَابُلُس Cerablus
- Town
- Location of Jarabulus in Syria
- Coordinates: 36°49′03″N 38°00′40″E
- Country: Syria
- Governorate: Aleppo
- District: Jarabulus
- Subdistrict: Jarabulus
- Elevation: 367 m (1,204 ft)

Population (2004)
  - Total: 11,570
- Time zone: UTC+3 (AST)
- Geocode: C2227

Jarabulus is the administrative center of Nahiya Jarabulus and Jarabulus District.

Jarabulus (Arabic: جَرَابُلُس, ALA-LC: Jarābulus, Aleppo dialect: Jrāblos; Turkish: Cerablus or Carablus; Kurdish: Cerablûs) is a Syrian city administratively belonging to Aleppo Governorate. Jarabulus lies on the western bank of the Euphrates and north of Euphrates Lake, just south of the Syria–Turkey border and the Turkish town of Karkamış. In the 2004 census, the city had a population of 11,570. The population has increased significantly during the Syrian civil war.

== History ==
In the Bronze and Iron Ages, the archaeological site lying just north of Jarabulus (half of which is now in Turkey) was called Karkemish, in Greek and Roman times the ancient name of the city was "Europos" (Εὐρωπός), which must have been at the origin of the modern form of the toponym Jerabis.

The original 18th century form of the toponym seems to have been "Djerabis", but it was later found as "Djeraboolos" or "Djerablus", probably deriving from Hierapolis (modern-day Manbij, to the southwest).

Being on the southern side of the Istanbul-Baghdad railway, Jarabulus became a border town with Turkey based on the Treaty of Lausanne in the aftermath of World War I.

Following the outbreak of the Syrian civil war, the Syrian opposition took over the town, along with its border post with Turkey on July 20, 2012. However, in July 2013 the town was captured by the jihadist militant group ISIS. By January 2014, rebels mainly from the al-Tawhid Brigade engaged in clashes with ISIS and seized the town, but ISIS was able to recapture it within hours.

An article published by The Guardian said that attempts by the People's Protection Units (YPG) to capture Jarabulus were prevented by Turkish President Recep Tayyip Erdoğan, who, according to media reports, had threatened in 2015 to attack the YPG if they moved against Jarabulus. This threat secured Islamic State control of the town.

=== Operation Euphrates Shield ===
On 24 August 2016 around 4:00 AM (local time), the Turkish Armed Forces, alongside their allies in the Free Syrian Army, launched a military operation into Syria to capture Jarabulus from the Islamic State. The operation was supported by the Turkish Air Force along with US-led coalition aircraft in an attempt to clear a passage for the troops. By 24 August, Jarabulus and neighboring towns were captured by the Syrian National Army. The SNA, backed by Turkish tanks, then connected Jarablus to al-Rai to push Islamic State forces away from the Turkish border.

== Demographics ==
Ethnically, the city is mostly composed of Arabs and Turkmens. Turkmens belong to the Barak tribe. The region overall likewise mostly consists of Arabs and Turkmens, but also houses the heterogenous Kurdish tribal confederation of Barazi, which also includes Arabs, from Jarabulus eastwards to Suruç. There are 16 thousand Kurds living near Jarabulus.

When British archaeologist David George Hogarth visited Jarabulus in early 20th century, he noted that the town was held by Arabs of the Geais Msahaleh clan and Turks of the Barak clan.

Since the end of the Syrian Civil War at least 6,872 IDPs (as of March 25) who were living in Jarablus have returned to their homes.

== Governance ==
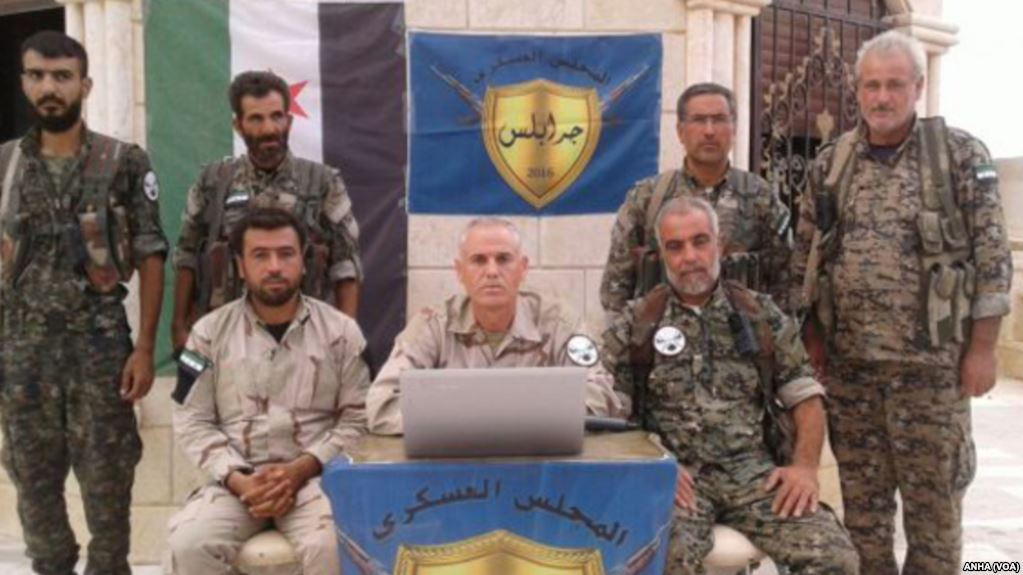
Jarabulus Military Council 2016

On 6 September 2016, the Karkamış-based council of Jarabulus that had been constituted 2 years prior, accused Turkey of attempting to replace them with a newly formed council consisting of pro-Turkish Turkmen separatists. The Sultan Murad Division denied the accusations and accused the local council of being PYD "collaborators", although it did confirm forming a "council of elders" in the city. Harakat Nour al-Din al-Zenki's political leader Yasser Ibrahim al-Yusuf, son of the perpetrator of the Aleppo Artillery School massacre, also said that the city would be governed by a newly formed council. The head of the Syrian Interim Government based in Turkey, Jawad Abu Hatab, met with the Jarabulus local council on the same day.

== Security ==
On 22 January 2017, a police force of 450 members trained and equipped by Turkey was deployed in Jarabulus. The Jarabulus police is headed by defected Syrian Army brigadier general Abdel Razaq Aslan.

== Education ==
Following the capture of Jarabulus by the Turkish Armed Forces from the Islamic State, children returned to school, learning Turkish as a foreign language instead of French. In October 2018, the Gaziantep University opened a vocational school in Jarabulus.

== Infrastructure ==
After the Turkish operation in August and September 2016, Turkish authorities planned to restore electricity to the city by building a three kilometres (1.9 miles) cable from Karkamış to Jarabulus, with two kilometres (1.2 miles) being in Syrian territory. Electricity and potable water were announced to be provided for free.

Later that month, after visits from Turkish officials and the mayor of Gaziantep Municipality, Jarabulus was connected to the Turkish electrical grid. A former school in Jarabulus was turned into a hospital with an official Turkish sign reading "Turkish Ministry of Health - Jarablus Hospital" with a flag of Turkey.

== Climate ==
Jarabulus has a hot-summer Mediterranean climate (Köppen climate classification Csa), with influences of a continental climate during winter, hot dry summers, and cool wet and occasionally snowy winters. The average high temperature in January is 7.8 °C (46.0 °F) and the average high temperature in August is 38.1 °C (100.6 °F). The snow falls usually in January, February or December.

Climate data for Jarabulus
Month	Jan	Feb	Mar	Apr	May	Jun	Jul	Aug	Sep	Oct	Nov	Dec	Year
Mean daily maximum °C (°F)	8.0 (46.4)	10.5 (50.9)	16.1 (61.0)	23.4 (74.1)	28.7 (83.7)	34.3 (93.7)	37.7 (99.9)	38.5 (101.3)	34.2 (93.6)	26.8 (80.2)	16.3 (61.3)	9.9 (49.8)	23.7 (74.7)
Mean daily minimum °C (°F)	−1.2 (29.8)	−0.6 (30.9)	4.3 (39.7)	7.2 (45.0)	12.5 (54.5)	15.1 (59.2)	19.9 (67.8)	20.9 (69.6)	16.3 (61.3)	12.4 (54.3)	6.4 (43.5)	−0.5 (31.1)	9.4 (48.9)
Average precipitation mm (inches)	71 (2.8)	49 (1.9)	39 (1.5)	35 (1.4)	20 (0.8)	3 (0.1)	0 (0)	0 (0)	3 (0.1)	21 (0.8)	32 (1.3)	64 (2.5)	337 (13.2)
Average rainy days	12	8	6	4	4	1	0	0	1	3	5	10	54
Average snowy days	2.0	1.0	0	0	0	0	0	0	0	0	0	1.5	4.5
Average relative humidity (%)	75	67	60	56	42	40	35	35	44	47	55	74	53
Source: Weather Online, Weather Base, BBC Weather and My Weather 2
