= Jarabulus District =

Jarabulus District منطقة جرابلس
- District
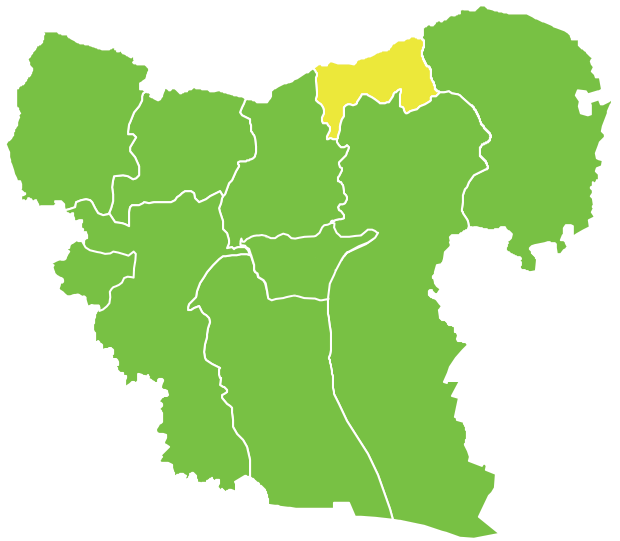
- Location of Jarabulus District within Aleppo Governorate

- Location in Syria
- Coordinates (Jarabulus): 36.82°N 38.02°E
- Country: Syria
- Governorate: Aleppo
- Seat: Jarabulus
- Subdistricts: 2 nawāḥī

Area
  - Total: 607.48 km^{2} (234.55 sq mi)

Population (2004)
  - Total: 58,889
  - Density: 96.940/km^{2} (251.07/sq mi)
- Geocode: SY0208

Jarabulus District (Arabic: منطقة جرابلس, romanized: manṭiqat Ğarābulus) is a district of Aleppo Governorate in northern Syria, on the border with Turkey. The administrative centre is the city of Jarabulus.

Subdistricts of Jarabulus District

The administrative center of Jarabulus Subdistrict shown above is the city of Jarabulus.

The administrative center of Ghandoura Subdistrict shown above is the city of Ghandoura.

At the 2004 census, the district had a population of 58,889. Ethnically, it is mostly composed of Arabs and Turkmens but also includes Kurds, who settled in the area during the 17th century.

The Euphrates river enters Syria from Turkey in Jarabulus.

== Subdistricts ==
The district of Jarabulus is divided into two subdistricts or nawāḥī (population as of 2004):

Subdistricts of Jarabulus District
Code	Name	Area	Population	Seat
SY020800	Jarabulus Subdistrict	316.52 km^{2}	41,575	Jarabulus
SY020801	Ghandoura Subdistrict	290.95 km^{2}	17,314	Ghandoura
