= Pine Residence =

Historical building and French embassy headquarters in Beirut, Lebanon

- قصر الصنوبر (Arabic)
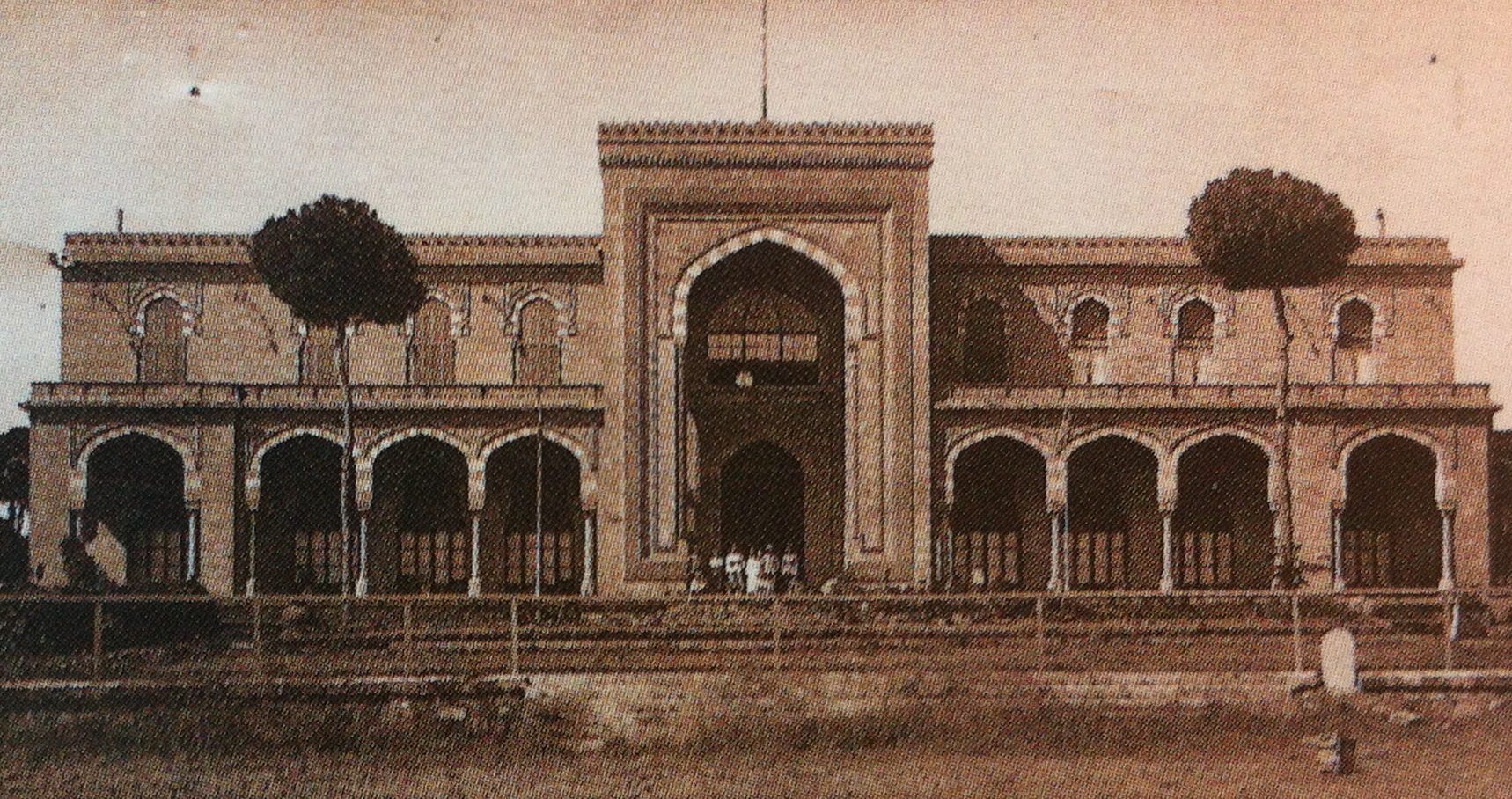
- The Pine Residence in 1918

- Location within Beirut Location within Lebanon
- 33.877201°N 35.508428°E
- Location: Beirut, Lebanon

History
- Built: 1920
- Built for: Azmi Bey, Wali of Beirut, Alfred Moussa Sursock

Site notes
- Architect: Bahjat Abdel Nour
- Architectural style: Neo-Mauresque
- Governing body: French Embassy in Beirut

The Pine Residence (Arabic: قصر الصنوبر, Qasr al-snawbar, literally "the palace of the Pines"), is the official residence of the French ambassador to Lebanon, situated in Beirut’s Horsh district. Constructed in 1916 by Alfred Moussa Sursock as part of a larger leisure complex, the building was repurposed during World War I as a military hospital before becoming the seat of the French High Commissioners under the Mandate. Following Lebanese independence in 1943, it was designated the ambassador’s residence. The French General Henri Gouraud proclaimed the establishment of the State of Greater Lebanon on 1 September 1920 from the porch of the residence.

== Background ==
The 19th century witnessed a considerable rise in seafaring traffic with the introduction of steamships and completion of the Suez Canal in 1869. Annual goods shipping weights rose from 40,000 tons to 1,700,000 tons between 1830 and 1914, and the first steamship arrived in Beirut in 1836. The Port of Beirut was developed by a French company to better handle the increasing amount of transported goods, and Beirut became a highly prominent port city in the Ottoman Empire after centuries of being reduced to a trifling walled town. The brief Egyptian rule from 1832 to 1840 was responsible for important urban planning and sanitation developments; it also opened up the city to foreign trade and influence. In 1888 Beirut was once again under Ottoman rule, it was elevated to a new status and became the capital of the Vilayet of Beirut.

The urban and architectural fabric of the until-then typical medieval Islamic walled city was changed by the Ottoman Ebniye and Turuk Regulations that were enacted in 1848 and 1864 as a part of the Tanzimat reforms and that would serve as a scheme for the development of Beirut until after the French mandate over Lebanon. The reforms resulted in greater city autonomy through the creation of municipalities and the development of the urban space. The municipality of Beirut was created in 1863. (Note: The municipality was known by the Turkish name of Meclis al-Baladi) Starting from 1860 and for twenty years, the Tanzimat impacted the transformation of the Beirut space heavily. The period was marked by the restoration of the ancient souks, the creation of new commercial spaces, the establishment of infrastructures on a big scale, and the building of large public and private buildings such as the Grand Serail and its annexes and the Pine residence. The movement catalyzed by the Tanzimat reforms set the foundation of a new framework for buildings characterized by works inspired by several European styles, such as neo-Baroque and neo-Gothic.

The affluent Beirutis were heavily influenced by the Western way of living; they moved out of the old city and built their villas on the hills surrounding Beirut and sought to create a recreation center away from the bustling and crowded city center. The Pine Park was chosen for its scenic greenery and its distance from the busy downtown area; a racecourse and a casino similar to the ones being built in European capitals were envisioned.

== Construction ==
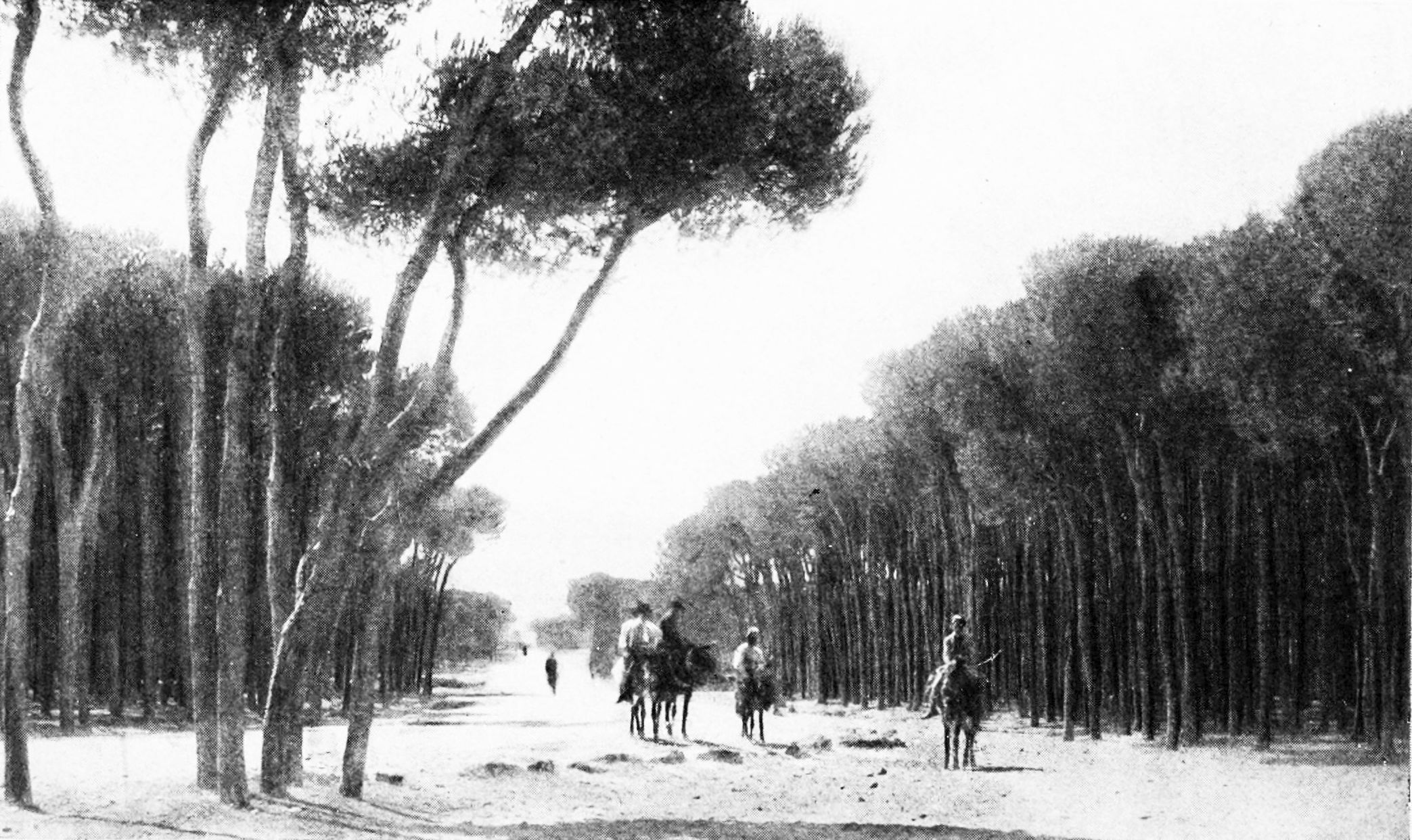
Beirut pine forest in 1914

In view of the modernization of Beirut's city center, the wali of Beirut Azmi Bey planned to build a high-end meeting place for the city's privileged class in the ‘Bois des Pins’; he commissioned the building of a casino and a horse racecourse.

The Pine Residence was built by Alfred Moussa Sursock, a Lebanese diplomat working as an official at the Ottoman embassy in Paris until the beginning of the First World War. Alfred returned to Beirut, and on December 5, 1915, he obtained a 50-year concession from then mayor of Beirut Kenaan Taher Bey for the management of 660,000 square metres (7,100,000 sq ft) of the Beirut pine forest, provided he builds the "Cercle du Parc du Bois" or "Cercle Azmi" (Azmi Club), the first casino in Lebanon. Sursock proceeded to build the casino and the horse racetrack on the plot and created the Ottoman Casino-Club Society ("Société du Casino-Club Ottoman") to that end. By the end of the 19th century the Beirut pine forest became a frequented promenade. The park hosted regular archery contests and a Kiosk where military music was played every Friday during winter.

The construction of "Qasr es-Sanawbar" began in 1916 under the supervision of the Sursock family architect Bahjat Abdel Nour and involved Amine Abdel Nour, Hussein al-Ahdab, Youssef Aftimus, Maroun Ghammacheh and Gaspard Nafilyan. The two-story building was completed in 1920; it consisted of a raised basement, a ground floor with a hall and a dining area, and an upper floor with game rooms. Nevertheless, the building never served as a casino because of the ongoing World War I; it was used as a military hospital instead.

=== Expansion ===
The residence underwent several alterations during the French Mandate. The Salon de Musique and the north–south façade were extended in 1928. In 1931, rooms on the northern side of the ground floor were converted into the Grand Salon and dining room. French architect Michel Écochard created the first-floor atrium in 1932.

== History ==
=== French mandate ===
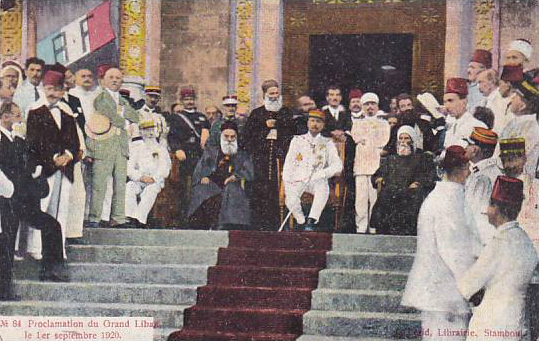
Proclamation of the state of Greater Lebanon

Plaque commemorating the proclamation of the state of Greater Lebanon on September 1, 1920.

After the World War I, the Ottoman Empire was partitioned and Lebanon passed under the French mandate. The then French Adviser on Foreign Affairs, François Georges-Picot was appointed Commissioner of the Ottoman Territories of Palestine and Syria; he arrived to Beirut and moved to the residence that served then as Azmy Bey's (then wali of Beirut) barracks and renamed it "Residence des Pins". On November 21, 1919, General Henri Gouraud, the French High Commissioner in Syria and Lebanon, arrived in Beirut and laid the groundwork for the acquisition of the Pine Residence buildings and was inspired by the Residence Lyautey in Rabat to develop the Beiruti residence's rudimentary installation.

On September 1, 1920, General Gouraud proclaimed from the porch of the Pine Residence the establishment of the State of Greater Lebanon with Beirut as its capital.

On September 28, 1921, the Sursocks reached an agreement by which the family yielded the property to the French state for a sum of 1.85 million French francs. The French State became the owner of the buildings and tenant of the Beirut municipal forest ground, which was adjacent to and separated from the Beirut Hippodrome by a simple wooden fence.

The high commissioners who resided in the Pine residence were:

From	To	High Commissioner
1919	1923	General Henri Gouraud
1923	1924	General Maxime Weygand
1924	1925	General Maurice Sarrail
1925	1926	Henry de Jouvenel
1926	1933	Henri Ponsot
1933	1939	Damien de Martel
1939	1940	Gabriel Puaux
1940	1940	Jean Chiappe (Note: His plane was shot down over Italy when he left to take office.)
1940	1941	General Henri Dentz
1941	1943	General Georges Catroux (Note: Décret de nomination du 24 Juin 1941.)
1943	1943	Jean Helleu (Note: Deleguate of the Free France.)
1944	1946	General Paul Beynet

During his first stay in Beirut between 1929 and 1932, Commander Charles de Gaulle lived in Achrafieh but he stayed at the Pine Residence when he returned to Lebanon as Head of the Free French Forces in July 1941 and August 1942.

=== The ambassador's residence ===
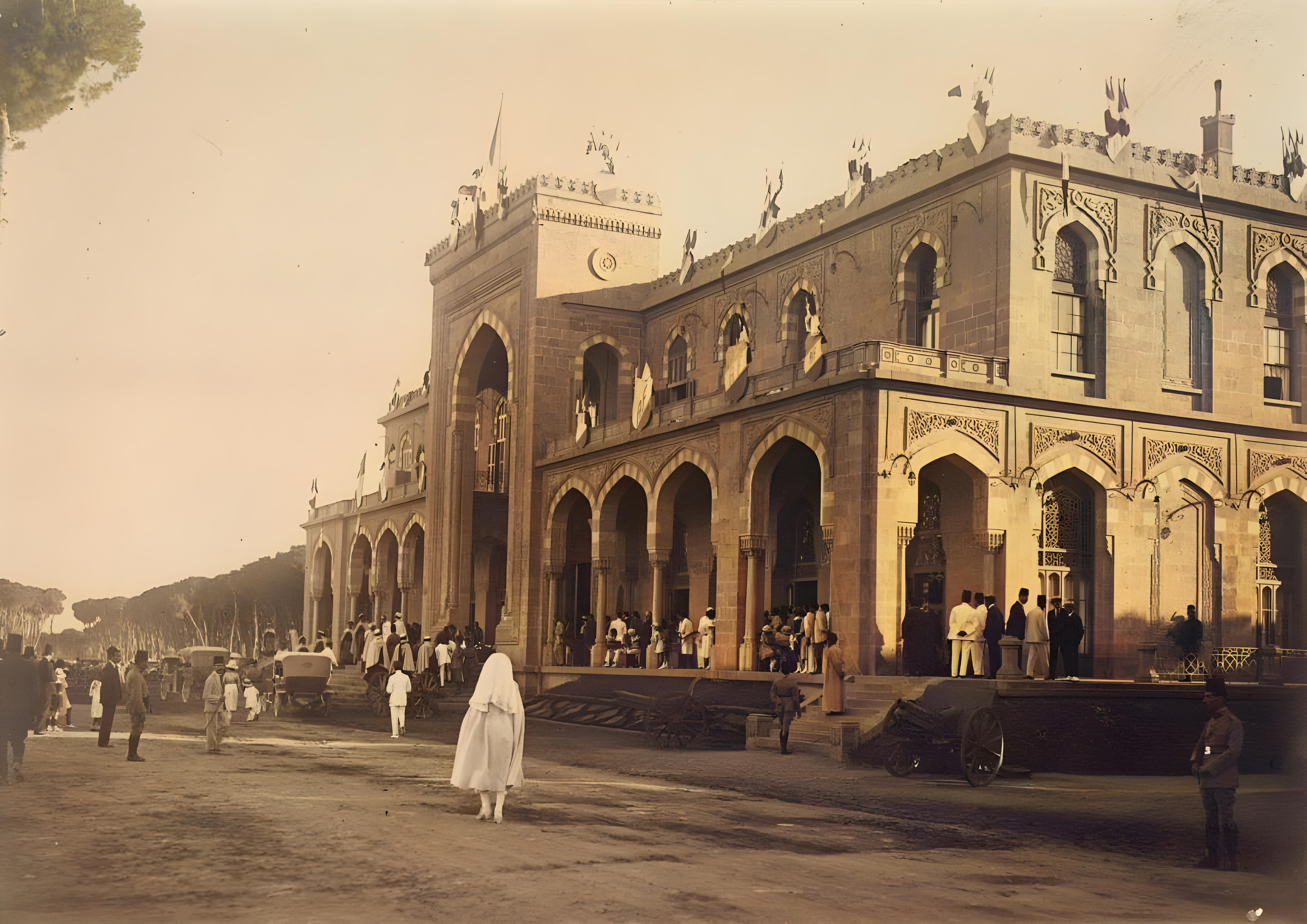
Reception at the Pine Residence in 1921

After the Lebanese Independence in 1943, the Pine Palace became the official residence of the Ambassadors of France to Lebanon.

The Embassy's land lease expired in 1964, and negotiations were undertaken so that France could acquire the symbolic premises. Talks ended in 1972 and on October 7 of that year, then-ambassador Michel Fontaine signed the agreement with the administrator of the Mohafazat of Beirut, Chafic Abou Haïdar. It wasn't long before the Lebanese Civil War began and Ambassador Argod was compelled to evacuate the embassy premises in May 1975 only to return by the end of 1976 until the Pine Residence was occupied by armed militias in 1978. Argod returned to the residence in late 1978 until the arrival of his successor, Ambassador Delamare, in 1979. Delamare, who lived in the Pine Residence with his family, was assassinated a few meters away from the embassy by the Syrian government on November 4, 1981. Until the beginning of the 1982 Israeli bombardments, Ambassador Paul-Marc Henry still lived in the palace, which was situated on the front-line of the Lebanese battlefield. The Pine Residence served successively as a field hospital for the French Army and then as headquarters to the international observers.

The premises were finally abandoned on February 4, 1984, and the guardianship of the building was passed to the special forces of the Lebanese Internal Security Forces as of April 8, 1986. At the end of the hostilities, the French state recuperated the heavily bombarded and pillaged edifice, the security of which was entrusted to the French Gendarmerie from May 25, 1991, until February 1995. The decision to rehabilitate the residence and to regroup all the services of the embassy in its proximity was taken during the service term of Ambassador Jean-Pierre Lafon, who arrived in May 1994. The rehabilitation works were inaugurated by then president Jacques Chirac during his official visit to Lebanon in April 1996. The works that were overseen by Ambassador Daniel Jouanneau were done in May 1998, and the Pine Residence was inaugurated in an official reception headed by President Chirac on May 30, 1998.

The Pine Residence was classified as a historic monument by the Lebanese Directorate General of Antiquities.

== See also ==
- List of Ambassadors of France to Lebanon
