= Third Ahmad Nami government =

1926–1928 Syrian government

- 14th government of Syria

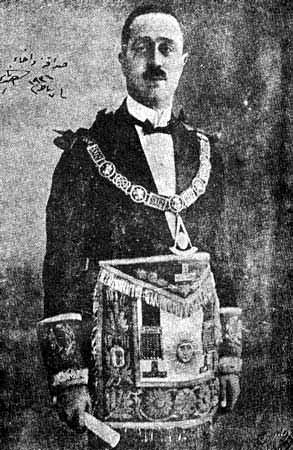
- Date formed: 2 December 1926
- Date dissolved: 8 February 1928

People and organisations
- President: Ahmad Nami
- High Commissioner: Henri Ponsot
- Head of government: Ahmad Nami
- No. of ministers: 7

History
- Predecessor: Nami II
- Successor: al-Hasani I

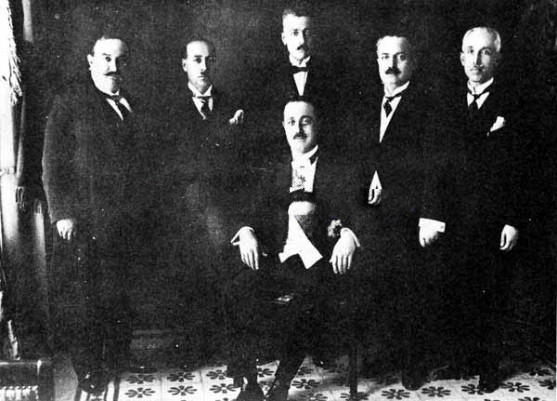
Ahmed Nami surrounded by members of his government

The Third Ahmad Nami government was formed under Decree No. 540 dated 2 December 1926, published in al-Asima gazette, issue 297. The government submitted its resignation on 8 February 1928, and the resignation was accepted under Decree No. 1812 dated 14 February 1928, whereupon Taj al-Din al-Hasani was appointed head of government.

It was the eleventh government in modern Syrian history, the fourth government of the State of Syria, and the third and final government headed by Ahmad Nami. It was also the first cabinet formed during the tenure of Henri Ponsot as High Commissioner under the Mandate for Syria and Lebanon. The government served for a year and a half, until February 1928, making it the longest-serving of Ahmad Nami's governments.

The government comprised figures close to the Mandate authorities. The government had been expected to call elections for a constituent assembly to draft a constitution for the country and to establish a long-term treaty with France to regulate the Mandate. However, Ponsot pursued a policy of delay and declined to call elections on various pretexts. As a form of pressure, the cabinet's ministers began discussing resignation among themselves from 3 February 1928 and informed Nami of their intention while he was in Beirut. Nami accepted the idea of resignation and resigned himself from Beirut. Taj al-Din al-Hasani was subsequently tasked with the presidency of the state and the formation of a new government.

== Major events ==
The suppression of the Great Syrian Revolt was perhaps the most significant event during this cabinet's tenure. Ponsot had reached agreements with Jordan and Iraq on cooperation in suppressing the revolt, while simultaneously hinting at addressing the two issues of greatest concern to the Syrian people: unity and independence. In August 1927, French forces launched a military campaign against the Ghouta of Damascus, and on 10 August Emir Izz al-Din al-Jaza'iri was killed in the fighting. This date is generally regarded by historians as marking the end of the revolt, by which point France had committed 110,000 soldiers to combating it.

== Composition ==
| Portfolio | Minister | Took office | Left office |
|---|---|---|---|
| President and head of government | Ahmad Nami | 4 May 1926 | 8 February 1928 |
| Minister of Interior | Raouf al-Ayyubi | 2 December 1926 | 8 February 1928 |
| Minister of Justice | Yusuf al-Hakim (acting) | 4 May 1926 | 8 February 1928 |
| Minister of Finance | Hamdi al-Nasr | 2 December 1926 | 8 February 1928 |
| Minister of Agriculture and Trade | Nasuhi al-Bukhari | 2 December 1926 | 8 February 1928 |
| Minister of Education | Shakir al-Hanbali | 12 June 1926 | 8 February 1928 |
| Minister of Public Works | Rashid al-Mudarris | 2 December 1926 | 8 February 1928 |

== See also ==
- Council of Ministers (Syria)
- List of Syrian governments
- Government ministries of Syria
- List of prime ministers of Syria
