= Second Taj al-Din al-Hasani government =

1934–1936 Syrian government

- 18th government of the Syrian Republic

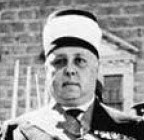
- Date formed: 17 March 1934
- Date dissolved: 23 February 1936

People and organisations
- President: Muhammad Ali al-Abid
- High Commissioner: Damien de Martel
- Prime Minister: Taj al-Din al-Hasani
- Prime Minister's history: al-Hasani I
- No. of ministers: 6
- Member party: ▌Independent

History
- Legislature term: –
- Predecessor: H. al-Azm II
- Successor: A. al-Ayyubi I

The Second Taj al-Din al-Hasani government was the eighteenth government in the history of modern Syria, serving from 17 March 1934 until 23 February 1936. Formed by decrees numbered 2240 to 2247 and published in the Official Gazette of the Syrian Republic, it was the third government of the First Syrian Republic and the third to serve under President Muhammad Ali al-Abid.

The government consisted entirely of independent and moderate politicians and did not receive the confidence of the Chamber of Deputies, which had been dissolved by the French High Commissioner. During its tenure, Syria remained under significant French Mandate influence, while nationalist opposition continued to grow. The death of nationalist leader Ibrahim Hananu and the outbreak of the 1936 general strike during the commemoration of his fortieth day memorial intensified political unrest, ultimately leading to the government's resignation on 23 February 1936.

== Composition ==
| Portfolio | Minister | Took office | Left office | Party |
|---|---|---|---|---|
| Prime Minister | Taj al-Din al-Hasani | 17 March 1934 | 23 February 1936 | Independent |
| Minister of Interior | Taj al-Din al-Hasani | 17 March 1934 | 23 February 1936 | Independent |
| Minister of Justice | Ata Bey al-Ayyubi | 17 March 1934 | 23 February 1936 | Independent |
| Minister of Finance | Henry Hindiyyah | 17 March 1934 | 23 February 1936 | Independent |
| Minister of Education | Husni al-Barazi | 17 March 1934 | 23 February 1936 | Independent |
| Minister of Public Works | Jamil al-Ulshi | 17 March 1934 | 23 February 1936 | Independent |
| Minister of Agriculture and Trade | Muhammad Yahya al-Adah Li | 17 March 1934 | 23 February 1936 | Independent |

== See also ==
- Council of Ministers (Syria)
- List of Syrian governments
- Government ministries of Syria
- List of prime ministers of Syria
