= Second Haqqi al-Azm government =

1932–1934 Syrian government

- 17th government of the Syrian Republic

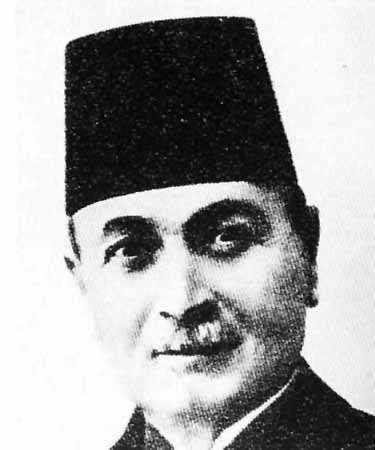
- Date formed: 15 June 1932
- Date dissolved: 17 March 1934

People and organisations
- President: Muhammad Ali al-Abid
- High Commissioner: Henri Ponsot (until 1933); Damien de Martel (from 1932)
- Prime Minister: Haqqi al-Azm
- Prime Minister's history: H. al-Azm I
- No. of ministers: 4 (until 1933); 5 (from 1933)
- Member parties: ▌National Bloc; ▌Independent

History
- Election: 1931–32
- Legislature term: 1st Chamber of Deputies
- Predecessor: Solomiac
- Successor: al-Hasani II

The Second Haqqi al-Azm government was the seventeenth government in the history of modern Syria, serving from 15 June 1932 until its resignation was accepted on 17 March 1934. Formed by a series of decrees issued on 15 June 1932 and published in the Official Gazette of the Syrian Republic, it was the first government of the First Syrian Republic and the first to serve under President Mohammad Ali al-Abid.

The government was the first in Syria to emerge from parliamentary elections and to receive the confidence of the Syrian Chamber of Deputies. It was formed as part of a political compromise between nationalist politicians and pro-Mandate moderates, which also resulted in the election of Mohammad Ali al-Abid as president and Subhi Barakat as speaker of parliament. During its tenure, the government faced criticism over its 1933 budget proposal and initiated negotiations with France for a treaty of friendship and cooperation. Political unrest following the visit of nationalist leader Ibrahim Hananu to Damascus ultimately led to the government's resignation at the urging of the French High Commissioner in June 1933.

== Composition ==
Portfolio	Minister	Took office	Left office	Party
Prime Minister	Haqqi al-Azm	15 June 1932	17 March 1934	Independent
Minister of Interior	Haqqi al-Azm	15 June 1932	17 March 1934	Independent
Minister of Justice	Mazhar Raslan	15 June 1932	18 April 1933	National Bloc
Minister of Justice	Suleiman al-Joukhdar	3 May 1933	17 March 1934	Independent
Minister of Education	Mazhar Raslan	15 June 1932	18 April 1933	National Bloc
Minister of Education	Selim Janbart	3 May 1933	15 November 1933	Independent
Minister of Education	Haqqi al-Azm	15 November 1933	17 March 1934	Independent
Minister of Finance	Jamil Mardam Bey	15 June 1932	18 April 1933	National Bloc
Minister of Finance	Shakir al-Shabani	3 May 1933	17 March 1934	Independent
Minister of Agriculture	Jamil Mardam Bey	15 June 1932	18 April 1933	National Bloc
Minister of Agriculture and Trade	Muhammad Yahya al-Adah Li	3 May 1933	17 March 1934	Independent
Minister of Public Works	Selim Janbart	15 June 1932	15 November 1933	Independent
Minister of Public Works	Latif Ghanima	15 November 1933	17 March 1934	National Bloc

== See also ==
- Council of Ministers (Syria)
- List of Syrian governments
- Government ministries of Syria
- List of prime ministers of Syria
