= Léon Solomiac government =

1931–1932 Syrian government

- 16th government of Syria
- Date formed: 19 November 1931
- Date dissolved: 11 June 1932

People and organisations
- President: Léon Solomiac (acting)
- High Commissioner: Henri Ponsot
- Head of government: Léon Solomiac
- No. of ministers: 7
- Member parties: ▌National Bloc; ▌Independent

History
- Predecessor: al-Hasani I
- Successor: H. al-Azm II

The Leon Solomiac government was the provisional government of the State of Syria that served from 19 November 1931 until 11 June 1932 during the French Mandate for Syria. It was established by High Commissioner Decision No. 2, published in the Official Bulletin of Administrative Affairs of the State of Syria on 19 November 1931.

The government was headed by Léon Solomiac, the deputy French high commissioner in Damascus. It remains the only government in Syrian history that was not headed by a Syrian national. According to the decree establishing it, the government's primary function was to act as a temporary administration overseeing the parliamentary elections following the promulgation of the Syrian Constitution of 1930.

During its tenure, the government supervised a two-stage parliamentary election process. The election results were announced on 9 April 1932, after which the newly elected parliament was convened. In accordance with constitutional provisions, the government resigned upon the assembly of the Chamber of Deputies.

== Composition ==
Portfolio	Minister	Took office	Left office	Party
President and head of government	Léon Solomiac (acting)	19 November 1931	11 June 1932	Independent
Minister of Interior	Badi' Muayyad al-Azm (acting)	19 November 1931	11 June 1932	Independent
Minister of Agriculture	Badi' Muayyad al-Azm (acting)	14 August 1930	11 June 1932	Independent
Minister of Finance	Tawfiq Shamia	14 August 1930	11 June 1932	National Bloc
Minister of Justice	Shakir al-Hanbali	14 August 1930	11 June 1932	Independent
Minister of Education	Muhammad Kurd Ali	15 February 1928	11 June 1932	Independent
General Secretary	Tawfiq al-Hayyani	21 November 1931	11 June 1932	Independent
Director of the Police	Bahij al-Khatib	21 November 1931	11 June 1932	Independent

== See also ==
- Council of Ministers (Syria)
- List of Syrian governments
- Government ministries of Syria
- List of prime ministers of Syria
