= Second Ahmad Nami government =

1926 Syrian government

- 13th government of Syria

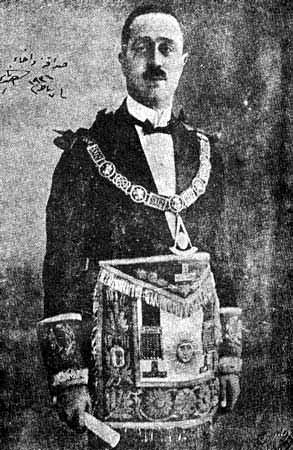
- Date formed: 12 June 1926
- Date dissolved: 2 December 1926

People and organisations
- President: Ahmad Nami
- High Commissioner: Henri Ponsot
- Head of government: Ahmad Nami
- No. of ministers: 6

History
- Predecessor: Nami I
- Successor: Nami III

The Second Ahmad Nami government was formed under Decree No. 81 dated 12 June 1926, published in al-Asima gazette, issue 293. It remained in office until a replacement cabinet was formed under Decree No. 540 dated 2 December 1926.

It was the tenth government in modern Syrian history, the third government of the State of Syria, the second government headed by Ahmad Nami. It served during a period coinciding with the suppression of the Great Syrian Revolt and the military operations and arrests that accompanied it. Unlike its predecessor, the First Ahmad Nami government, which had included prominent nationalist figures such as Fares al-Khoury, this cabinet consisted entirely of individuals close to the Mandate authorities and included two ministers from the al-Azm family, making it the first Syrian cabinet to include two ministers from the same family.

== Achievements ==
During this cabinet's tenure, President of State Ahmad Nami and High Commissioner de Jouvenel reached an agreement calling for elections to draft a constitution for the country and to convert the Mandate into a thirty-year treaty between Syria and France, defining the rights and obligations of both parties, to enter into force upon ratification by the Syrian legislature to be elected following the adoption of a constitution. De Jouvenel failed to persuade Paris to accept this agreement and submitted his resignation — despite having achieved comparable success in Lebanon, where he had overseen the drafting of the Constitution of Lebanon and the election of Charles Debbas as president. The cabinet also worked towards the annexation of the Sanjak of Alexandretta, though this proved temporary as the sanjak was separated again in 1936; it similarly failed in its efforts to incorporate the Government of Latakia into the territory of the Syrian State.

It had also been planned that Ahmad Nami would issue a general amnesty in exchange for a peaceful end to the Great Syrian Revolt and the proclamation of full Syrian unity; however, he ultimately refrained from delivering a public address to that effect accompanied by the amnesty. Given the brevity of this cabinet's term, it left no significant achievements in the fields of administration, economics, or enacted legislation.

== Composition ==
Portfolio	Minister	Took office	Left office
President and head of government	Ahmad Nami	4 May 1926	2 December 1926
Minister of Interior	Wathiq Moayad al-Azm	12 June 1926	2 December 1926
Minister of Justice	Yusuf al-Hakim (acting)	4 May 1926	2 December 1926
Minister of Finance	Abdul Qadir Al-Azm	12 June 1926	2 December 1926
Minister of Agriculture and Economy	Wathiq Moayad al-Azm (acting)	4 May 1926	2 December 1926
Minister of Education	Shakir al-Hanbali	12 June 1926	2 December 1926
Minister of Public Works and Commerce	Shakib Maysar	12 June 1926	2 December 1926
Minister of Endowments	Vacant	12 June 1926	2 December 1926
