= Second Subhi Bey Barakat government =

1924–1925 Syrian government

- 11th government of the State of Syria

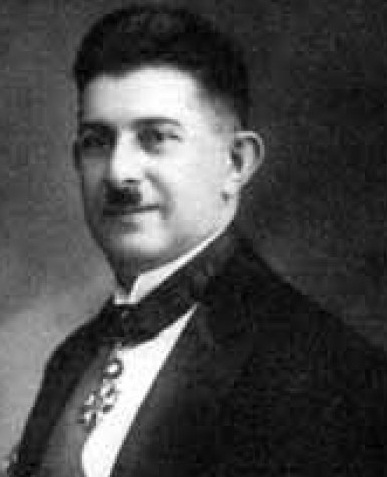
- Date formed: 21 December 1924
- Date dissolved: 21 December 1925

People and organisations
- President: Subhi Bey Barakat
- High Commissioner: Maurice Sarrail
- Head of government: Subhi Bey Barakat
- No. of ministers: 6

History
- Predecessor: Barakat I
- Successor: Nami I

The Second Subhi Bey Barakat government was formed on 21 December 1925 under Decree No. 1, issued by the president of the State of Syria, Subhi Barakat al-Khalidi, on 20 December 1924 and published in the al-Asima gazette, issue 275.

It was the third cabinet of the French Mandate for Syria and Lebanon era and the first government of the entity known as the "State of Syria", which united the territories of the states of Damascus and Aleppo. It was also the second cabinet in which the head of government held both the presidency and the prime ministership simultaneously, and the second cabinet to be headed by Subhi Barakat. Under the decree establishing the Syrian State, the president's term — and that of his government — was to run for three years, until 31 December 1927. However, the government resigned on 21 December 1925 following the outbreak of the Great Syrian Revolt. The country subsequently entered a governmental crisis during which François Pierre-Alype, the deputy high commissioner in Damascus, assumed the duties of head of government, while General Andrea was appointed military governor of Damascus. This period lasted from 9 February 1926 until 26 April 1926.

== Major events ==
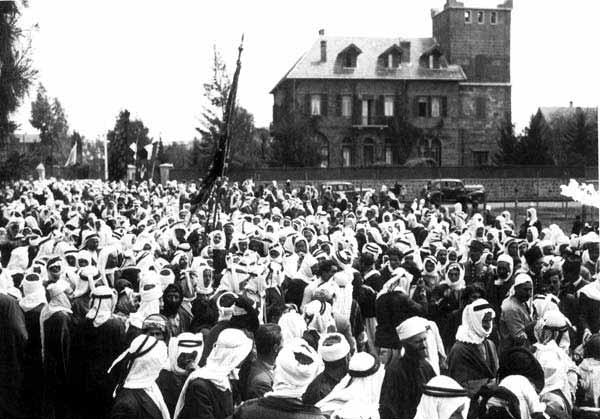
Syrian rebels in Jabal al-Arab, during the Great Syrian Revolt.

Weygand's commissionership did not last long enough to see the Syrian State's work take shape: on 2 January General Sarrail was appointed in his place as high commissioner for Syria and Lebanon. Sarrail encouraged the development of party political activity in the country, which gave rise to a number of parties, the most prominent being the People's Party, whose first secretary-general was Abd al-Rahman Shahbandar and whose leading figures included Faris al-Khoury and Lutfi al-Haffar, as well as the rival Independence Party led by Shukri al-Quwwatli.

In an attempt to placate continuing Syrian demands for unity, Sarrail issued a statement on 19 January declaring the inhabitants of the Druze and Alawite states to be Syrian nationals. In April 1925, Arthur James Balfour visited Damascus and stayed at the Victoria Hotel, prompting mass demonstrations throughout the city calling for the repudiation of the Balfour Declaration; the police were unable to suppress the protests and Balfour was compelled to depart for Beirut the same day.

On 21 July 1925, Sultan Pasha al-Atrash proclaimed the Great Syrian Revolt against France from al-Suwayda. By the end of August the revolt had spread to Damascus, the Ghouta, the surrounding countryside, and other parts of Syria. French forces were defeated at the Battle of Musayfira in September 1925, and on 9 October the revolt reached Hama under the command of Fawzi al-Qawuqji. On 18 October, rebels in Damascus besieged the Azm Palace, the headquarters of General Sarrail, where Subhi Barakat and the state's ministers were sheltering. In response, Sarrail ordered Damascus bombarded by tanks and aircraft in an assault lasting twenty-four hours.

The shelling and burning of Damascus provoked widespread outrage even in France, and Sarrail was recalled, departing Syria on 10 November; he was replaced by Henri de Jouvenel. On 30 November, the Syrian Association in Paris presented the new high commissioner with a six-point list of demands; de Jouvenel pledged to work towards meeting them but fulfilled none, instead attempting to negotiate with the revolt's leaders before issuing a decree on 30 December calling for general elections.

== Composition ==
Portfolio	Minister	Took office	Left office
President and head of government	Subhi Bey Barakat	21 December 1924	21 December 1925
Ministry of Interior	Nasri Bakhash	21 December 1924	21 December 1925
Ministry of Justice	Ata Bey al-Ayyubi	24 February 1923	27 August 1925
Ministry of Justice	Muhammad Jalal al-Din al-Zuhdi	27 August 1925	21 December 1925
Ministry of Finance	Muhammad Jalal al-Din al-Zuhdi	21 December 1924	27 August 1925
Ministry of Finance	Hamdi al-Nasr	27 August 1925	21 December 1925
Minister of Education	Rida Said	21 December 1924	21 December 1925
Ministry of Public Works, Agriculture, and Economic Reform	Hasan Izzet Pasha	28 June 1922	21 December 1925

== See also ==
- Council of Ministers (Syria)
- List of Syrian governments
- Government ministries of Syria
- List of prime ministers of Syria
