= First Subhi Bey Barakat government =

1922–1924 Syrian government

- 10th government of the Syrian Federation

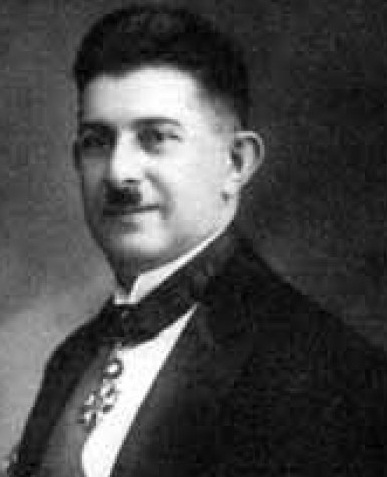
- Date formed: 28 June 1922
- Date dissolved: 21 December 1924

People and organisations
- President: Subhi Bey Barakat
- High Commissioner: Henri Gouraud (1922); Robert de Caix (1922–1923)); Maxime Weygand (1923–1924); Maurice Sarrail (1924)
- Head of government: Subhi Bey Barakat
- No. of ministers: 5

History
- Predecessor: H. al-Azm I
- Successor: Barakat II

The First Subhi Bey Barakat government was formed pursuant to Decree No. 1 of the Federal Council on 28 June 1922 and remained in office until 21 December 1924.

It was the only federal government in the history of Syria, as well as the first government whose head simultaneously held the offices of Prime Minister and Head of State. It was also the only Syrian government formed in Aleppo rather than Damascus.

The Syrian Federation was formally dissolved by Decree No. 2980, issued by High Commissioner Maxime Weygand on 5 December 1924 and effective as of 1 January 1925. The decree merged the States of Aleppo and Damascus into the new State of Syria and appointed Subhi Barakat as president of the new state.

== Formation ==
In April 1922, widespread demonstrations in Damascus sparked opposing the mandate and demanding an end to Syria's division into five statelets along sectarian and ethnic lines.

On 9 April, General Gouraud declared a state of emergency throughout Syria. The following day, school students defied the curfew, leading to mass demonstrations joined by women. Two students were killed and six wounded. On 18 April, French authorities launched a wave of arrests and deported detainees to Arwad Island.

Under mounting public pressure, Gouraud announced on 28 July 1922 the establishment of the Syrian Federation as a federal union between the State of Damascus, the State of Aleppo, and the Alawite State. The federation was to be headed by a president elected for a single non-renewable one-year term by a federal council of fifteen members, five from each constituent state. The president was also entrusted with forming the federal government, while local governments and councils would remain within each state.

=== Federal Council ===
Although Gouraud had declared that the Federal Council would be elected, he instead appointed it directly on 28 June 1922 as follows:

- Representatives of the State of Damascus
  - Muhammad Ali al-Abid
  - Ata al-Ayyubi
  - Fares al-Khoury
  - Tahir al-Atassi (representing Homs)
  - Rashid al-Barazi (representing Hama)
- Representatives of the State of Aleppo
  - Subhi Barakat
  - Ghalib Ibrahim Pasha
  - Rashid al-Mudarris
  - Hussein Urfali
  - Iskandar Salim
- Representatives of the Alawite State
  - Jaber al-Abbas
  - Ismail Hawwash
  - Ismail Junaid
  - Abd al-Wahid Harun
  - Ishaq Nasri

On the same day, the council convened in Aleppo and elected Subhi Barakat as President of the Federation.

== Achievements ==
The government established the Syrian Federal Gendarmerie and appointed Mustafa Ni'mat al-Abbasi as its director.

On 23 November 1923, it issued a decree abolishing the foreign privileges granted to European states since the days of the Ottoman Empire, including the right of Europeans to be tried before foreign courts. These were replaced by mixed courts presided over by a French judge with one Syrian and one French associate judge, with branches in Damascus and Aleppo.

On 1 August 1922, Subhi Barakat signed an agreement with representatives of Greater Lebanon and the Jabal Druze State establishing the Banque de Syrie et du Liban, headquartered in Paris. The agreement introduced a national currency for the Syrian Federation, Greater Lebanon, and Jabal Druze: the Syrian pound, pegged to the French franc.

On 24 July 1922, during this government's tenure, the mandate instrument was formally ratified by the League of Nations.

== Resignation and Dissolution of the Federation ==
In early 1923, Henri Gouraud was recalled to France. On 9 May 1924, Maxime Weygand arrived as the new high commissioner.

Following a tour of Damascus, Aleppo, and Latakia, local notables informed him that the Syrian Federation and its representative institutions were insufficient. They demanded the unification of Syrian territories into a single state, the establishment of a constituent assembly to draft a new constitution, and the formation of a government responsible before an elected parliament.

On 26 July 1924, Weygand announced his intention to unite Damascus and Aleppo. This was implemented on 15 December 1924, when the Syrian Federation was dissolved and replaced by the State of Syria, excluding the Alawite State and Jabal al-Druze.

The same decree detached the Sanjak of Alexandretta from Aleppo and placed it directly under the president of Syria, while granting it financial and administrative autonomy.

Weygand appointed Subhi Barakat president of the new Syrian state for a three-year term and asked him to form a new government, thereby preserving the union of the offices of head of state and prime minister.

The new State of Syria officially came into existence on 1 January 1925.

== Composition ==
Portfolio	Minister	Took office	Left office
Director of Administration and Federal Civil Affairs	Nasri Bakhash	28 June 1922	21 December 1924
Director of Finance	Muhammad Ali al-Abid	28 June 1922	21 December 1924
Director of Federal Public Works	Hasan Izzet Pasha	28 June 1922	21 December 1924
Director of Justice	Ata al-Ayyubi	24 February 1923	21 December 1924
Director of the Gendarmerie	Mustafa Ni'mat	24 February 1923	21 December 1924

== See also ==
- Council of Ministers (Syria)
- List of Syrian governments
- Government ministries of Syria
- List of prime ministers of Syria
