= First Ahmad Nami government =

1926 Syrian government

- 12th government of Syria

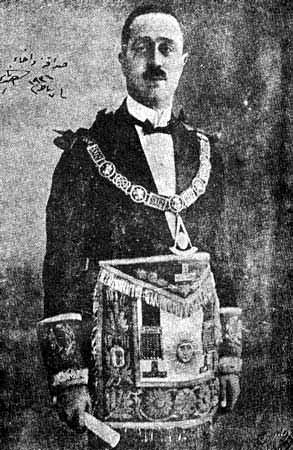
- Date formed: 4 May 1926
- Date dissolved: 12 June 1926

People and organisations
- President: Ahmad Nami
- High Commissioner: Henry de Jouvenel
- Head of government: Ahmad Nami
- No. of ministers: 7

History
- Predecessor: Barakat II
- Successor: Nami II

The First Ahmad Nami government was formed under Decree No. 1 dated 4 May 1926, published in al-Asima gazette, issue 291, in June of 1926.

It was the ninth government in modern Syrian history, the second government of the State of Syria, the first government formed by Ahmad Nami, and the second government formed during the tenure of Henry de Jouvenel as High Commissioner. It is also considered one of the shortest-lived governments in Syrian history, having resigned after approximately one month on 12 June, following the arrest of three of its ministers.

The government was formed during a turbulent period in the country's history: the Great Syrian Revolt was then at its height, and the French were attempting by every means to suppress it without success. It was furthermore formed immediately after a period of direct military rule under French General François Pierre-Alype, which had lasted from 8 February to 2 May 1926 and had equally failed to quell the revolt. The government's inaugural statement, addressed by its head to the Syrian people, pledged to work towards the unification of the country, the calling of elections, and the drafting of a constitution. None of these goals was achieved during its tenure. Among the most notable events of this government's tenure was the arrest by French forces of three of its ministers — Husni al-Barazi, Fares al-Khoury, and Lutfi al-Haffar — on charges of inciting the rebels to continue fighting. These ministers, who were affiliated with the National Bloc, were first exiled to Al-Hasakah Governorate and subsequently to Lebanon, where they remained until 1927.

== Composition ==
Portfolio	Minister	Took office	Left office
President and head of government	Ahmad Nami	4 May 1926	12 June 1926
Minister of Interior	Husni al-Barazi	4 May 1926	12 June 1926
Minister of Justice	Yusuf al-Hakim (acting)	4 May 1926	12 June 1926
Minister of Finance	Shakir Ni'mat al-Sha'bani	4 May 1926	12 June 1926
Minister of Agriculture and Economy	Wathiq Moayad al-Azm	4 May 1926	12 June 1926
Minister of Education	Fares al-Khoury	4 May 1926	12 June 1926
Minister of Public Works and Commerce	Lutfi al-Haffar	4 May 1926	12 June 1926
Minister of Endowments	Vacant	4 May 1926	12 June 1926

== See also ==
- Council of Ministers (Syria)
- List of Syrian governments
- Government ministries of Syria
- List of prime ministers of Syria
