= First Taj al-Din al-Hasani government =

1928–1931 Syrian government

- 15th government of Syria

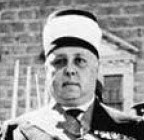
- Date formed: 15 February 1928
- Date dissolved: 19 November 1931

People and organisations
- President: Taj al-Din al-Hasani
- High Commissioner: Henri Ponsot
- Head of government: Taj al-Din al-Hasani
- No. of ministers: 7; 6 (from 1930)
- Member parties: ▌National Bloc; ▌Independent

History
- Predecessor: Nami III
- Successor: Solomiac

The First Taj al-Din al-Hasani government was formed under Decree No. 1813 on 15 February 1928, published in the fortnightly bulletin of the administrative proceedings of the Syrian State government. It resigned on 19 November 1931.

It was the twelfth government in modern Syrian history, the fifth cabinet of the State of Syria, and the first cabinet headed by Taj al-Din al-Hasani. It was also the first Syrian government to be headed by a cleric.

== Achievements ==
On 16 February, al-Hasani issued a decree granting a general amnesty for all participants in the Great Syrian Revolt, with the exception of seventy prominent nationalist figures including Sultan al-Atrash. On 17 February, a decree was announced abolishing press censorship, and elections for a constituent assembly were called under the rules of the 1923 electoral law without amendment. The Constituent Assembly was tasked with drafting a constitution for the country; its elections were held in two stages, on 10 April and 24 April respectively. Hashim al-Atassi was elected its president, and the assembly held its first session on 9 June, concluding them on 11 August after fifteen sessions, during which it drafted Syria's second constitution. The constitution stipulated that the country was a parliamentary republic with Damascus as its capital and Islam as the religion of its president, and struck a balance in distributing powers among the parliament, the president, and the government.

The French High Commissioner rejected the constitution on the grounds that it conflicted with the Mandate instrument and demanded the annulment of six of its articles. On 15 August, following the Assembly's refusal of his demand, he ordered the suspension of its sessions and subsequently dissolved it in May 1929.

The French High Commissioner eventually published the constitution in May 1930, but declined to call parliamentary elections, and protests continued. A year later, Ponsot issued a decree calling for elections — but only after the government and its president had resigned on 16 November 1931. Despite the close ties between its president and the Mandate authorities, this cabinet failed to achieve the unification of the country.

== Composition ==
Portfolio	Minister	Took office	Left office	Party
President and head of government	Taj al-Din al-Hasani	15 February 1928	19 November 1931	Independent
Minister of Interior	Saeed Mahasin	15 February 1928	14 August 1930	Independent
Minister of Interior	Taj al-Din al-Hasani	14 August 1930	19 November 1931	Independent
Minister of Justice	Subhi an-Nayyal	15 February 1928	14 August 1930	Independent
Minister of Justice	Shakir al-Hanbali	14 August 1930	19 November 1931	Independent
Minister of Finance	Jamil al-Ulshi	15 February 1928	14 August 1930	Independent
Minister of Finance	Tawfiq Shamia	14 August 1930	19 November 1931	National Bloc
Minister of Agriculture and Trade	Abdul Qader al-Keilani	15 February 1928	14 August 1930	National Bloc
Minister of Agriculture and Trade	Badi' Muayyad al-Azm	14 August 1930	19 November 1931	Independent
Minister of Education	Muhammad Kurd Ali	15 February 1928	19 November 1931	Independent
Minister of Public Works	Tawfiq Shamia	15 February 1928	14 August 1930	National Bloc
Minister of Public Works	Fouad al-Adli	14 August 1930	19 November 1931	Independent

== See also ==
- Council of Ministers (Syria)
- List of Syrian governments
- Government ministries of Syria
- List of prime ministers of Syria
