= Mandate for Syria and the Lebanon =

League of Nations mandate

Coordinates: 36°12′N 37°09′E

Mandate for Syria and the Lebanon (1923−1946)
- Front cover of the Mandate document, 1922
- Created: 1920–1922
- Ratified: 1923
- Location: UNOG Library; ref.: C.528. M.313. 1922. VI.
- Signatories: League of Nations
- Purpose: Creation of: State of Syria (from the previous Syrian Federation); Greater Lebanon; Alawite State; Jabal ad-Druze; Hatay State

The Mandate for Syria and the Lebanon (French: Mandat pour la Syrie et le Liban; Arabic: الانتداب الفرنسي على سوريا ولبنان, romanized: al-intidāb al-faransī ʻalā sūriyā wa-lubnān, also referred to as the Levant States; 1923−1946) was a League of Nations mandate founded in the aftermath of the First World War and the partitioning of the Ottoman Empire concerning the territories of Syria and Lebanon. The mandate system was supposed to differ from colonialism, with the governing country intended to act as a trustee until the inhabitants were considered eligible for self-government. At that point, the mandate would terminate, and a sovereign state would be born.

During the two years that followed the end of the war in 1918 and in accordance with the Sykes–Picot Agreement, signed by the United Kingdom and France during the war, the British held control of most of Ottoman Iraq (now Iraq) and the southern part of Ottoman Syria (now Israel, Palestine and Jordan), and the French controlled the rest of Ottoman Syria (including Lebanon, Alexandretta and portions of Cilicia). In the early 1920s, British and French control of those territories became formalised by the League of Nations' mandate system. On 29 September 1923, France was assigned the League of Nations mandate of Syria, which included the territory of present-day Lebanon and Alexandretta in addition to modern Syria. The League of Nations monitored the mandates through the Permanent Mandates Commission (PMC), which allowed other states to voice their thoughts on the management of the mandates, such as on economic matters.

The administration of the region under the French was carried out through a number of different governments and territories, including the Syrian Federation (1922–1924), the State of Syria (1925–1930) and the Mandatory Syrian Republic (1930–1946), as well as smaller states: Greater Lebanon, the Alawite State and the Jabal Druze State. Hatay State was annexed by Turkey in 1939. The French mandate lasted until 1946, when French troops finally left Syria and Lebanon, which had both declared independence during World War II.

== Background ==
With the defeat of the Ottomans in Syria, British troops, under General Sir Edmund Allenby, entered Damascus in 1918 and were accompanied by troops of the Arab Revolt, led by Faisal, the son of Hussein bin Ali, King of Hejaz. Faisal established the first new postwar Arab government in Damascus in October 1918, and named Ali Rikabi a military governor.

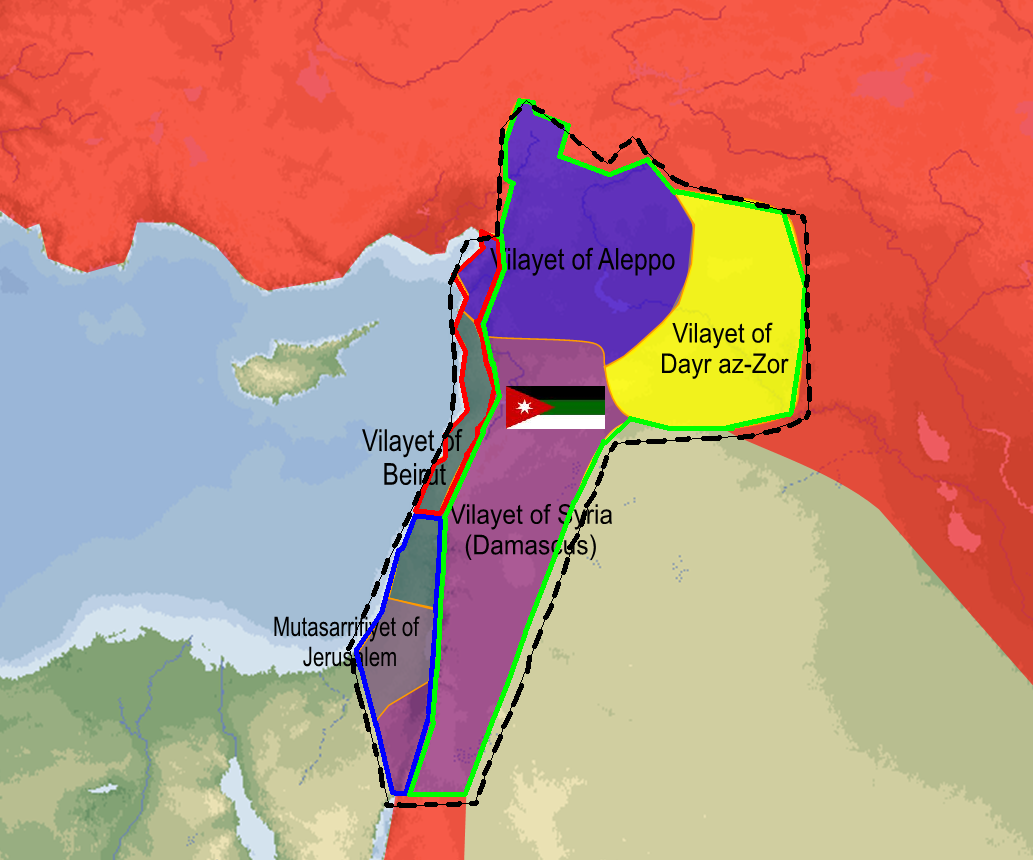
The Kingdom of Syria in 1918

The new Arab administration formed local governments in the major Syrian cities, and the pan-Arab flag was raised all over Syria. The Arabs, trusting earlier British promises, hoped that the new Arab state would include all Arab lands stretching from Aleppo, in northern Syria, to Aden, in southern Yemen.

However, in accordance with the secret Sykes–Picot Agreement between the United Kingdom and France, General Allenby assigned to the Arab administration only the interior regions of Syria (the eastern zone). Palestine (the southern zone) was reserved for the British. On 8 October, French troops disembarked in Beirut, occupied the Lebanese coastal region south to Naqoura (the western zone) and replaced the British troops there. The French immediately dissolved the local Arab governments in the region.

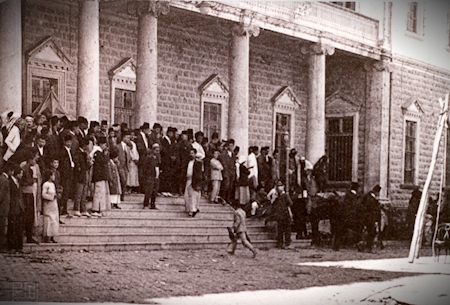
The Syrian National Congress in 1919

France demanded full implementation of the Sykes–Picot Agreement, with Syria under its control. On 26 November 1919, British forces withdrew from Damascus to avoid confrontation with the French and left the Arab government to face France. Faisal had travelled several times to Europe since November 1918 to attempt to convince France and Britain to change their positions. However, France's determination to intervene in Syria was shown by the naming of General Henri Gouraud as high commissioner in Syria and Cilicia. At the Paris Peace Conference, Faisal found himself in an even weaker position when the European powers decided to renege on the promises that had been made to the Arabs. Throughout the early period of colonial administration, collaboration persisted between the British and the French authorities in the region in fulfillment of economic interests of both parties in the region such as the establishment of a customs-free zone for goods produced within the territories that were controlled by the British and the French.

In May 1919, elections were held for the Syrian National Congress, which convened in Damascus, had 80% of the seats go to conservatives. However, the minority included dynamic figures of Arab nationalism such as Jamil Mardam Bey, Shukri al-Kuwatli, Ahmad al-Qadri, Ibrahim Hanano and Riyad as-Solh. The head was the moderate nationalist Hashim al-Atassi.

In June 1919, the American King–Crane Commission arrived in Syria to inquire into local public opinion about the future of the country. The commission's remit extended from Aleppo to Beersheba. It visited 36 major cities, met with more than 2,000 delegations from more than 300 villages and received more than 3,000 petitions. Its conclusions confirmed the Syrians' opposition to the mandate in their country and to the Balfour Declaration, as well as their demand for a unified Greater Syria encompassing Palestine. The commission's conclusions were ignored by both Britain and France.

Customs stamp of the states under French mandate after WWI (among them Syria) around 1925. The text is 'DOUANES DES ÉTATS SOUS MANDAT FRANÇAIS' (Customs of the states under French mandate)

Unrest erupted in Syria when Faisal accepted a compromise with French Prime Minister Georges Clemenceau. Anti-Hashemite demonstrations broke out, and Muslim inhabitants in and around Mount Lebanon revolted for fear of being incorporated into a new, mainly Christian, state of Greater Lebanon. Much of the French claim to those territories in the Levant was that France had been acknowledged as a protector of the minority Christian communities by the Ottoman Empire.

In March 1920, the Congress in Damascus adopted a resolution rejecting the Faisal-Clemenceau accords; declared the independence of Syria in its natural borders, including southern Syria and Palestine; and proclaimed Faisal the king of all Arabs. Faisal invited Ali Rikabi to form a government. The congress also proclaimed political and economic union with neighboring Iraq and demanded its independence as well.

On 25 April, the Supreme Inter-Allied Council, which was formulating the Treaty of Sèvres, granted France the mandate of Syria (including Lebanon) and Britain the Mandate of Palestine (later including Trans-Jordan) and Iraq. Syrians reacted with violent demonstrations, and a new government headed by Hashim al-Atassi was formed on 7 May 1920. The new government decided to organise general conscription and began forming an army.

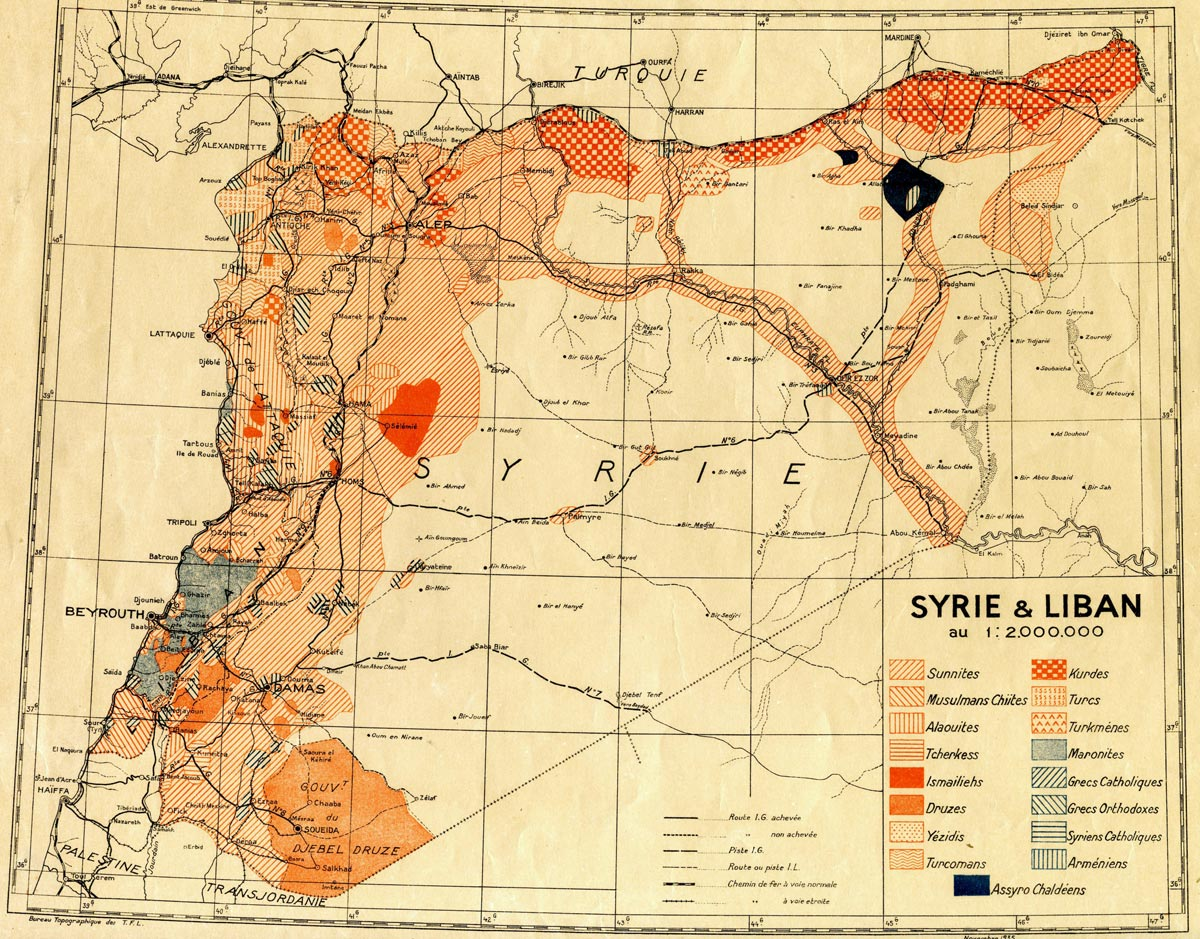
1935 population map of the French mandate in Syria and Lebanon

France responded to those decisions by violent suppressions, along with the Maronite patriarchate of Mount Lebanon, which denounced the decisions as a "coup d'état". In Beirut, the Christian press expressed its hostility to the decisions of Faisal's government. Lebanese nationalists used the crisis against Faisal's government to convene a council of Christian figures in Baabdam which proclaimed the independence of Lebanon on 22 March 1920.

On 14 July 1920, General Gouraud issued an ultimatum to Faisal that gave him the choice between submission or abdication. Realising that the power balance was not in his favour, Faisal chose to cooperate. However, the young minister of war, Yusuf al-Azma, refused to comply. In the resulting Franco-Syrian War, Syrian troops under al-Azmeh, composed of the few remaining troops of the Arab army, along with Bedouin horsemen and civilian volunteers, met the better-trained 12,000-strong French forces under General Mariano Goybet at the Battle of Maysaloun. The French won the battle in less than a day, and al-Azmeh died on the battlefield, along with many of the Syrian troops. The remaining troops possibly defected. General Goybet captured Damascus with little resistance on 24 July 1920, and the mandate was written in London two years later, on 24 July 1922.

== States created ==
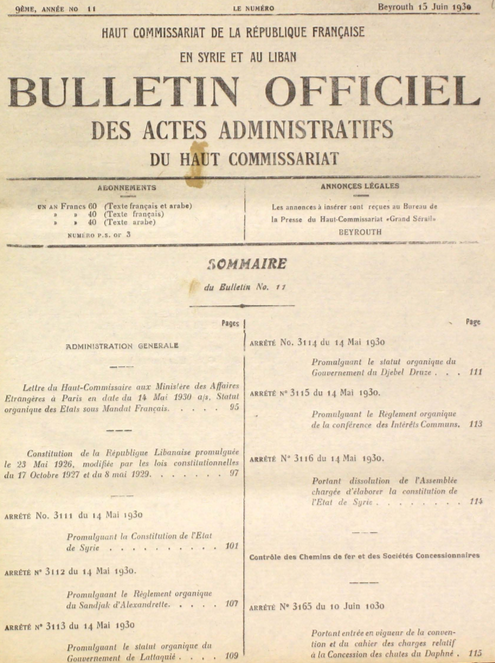
Bulletin Officiel des Actes Administratifs du Haut Commissariat, 14 May 1930, announcing the constitutions of the states within the French Mandate of Syria and Lebanon

Map showing the states of the French Mandate from 1921 to 1922

Arriving in Lebanon, the French were received as protectors by much of the Maronite population, which saw French rule as a step toward autonomy, but in the rest of Syria, they faced widespread resistance.

The mandate region was subdivided into six states: the states of Damascus (1920), Aleppo (1920), Alawites (1920), Jabal Druze (1921), the autonomous Sanjak of Alexandretta (1921, modern-day Hatay) and the State of Greater Lebanon (1920), the last of which became later the modern country of Lebanon.

While those divisions were partly based on the sectarian demographics, they also reflected French colonial strategy. By encouraging localised identities, the French sought to weaken nationalist movements prevent the emergence of a unified identity. Many of the different Syrian sects were hostile to the French mandate and to the division that it created, as was shown by the numerous revolts that the French encountered in all of the Syrian states. The Maronites of Mount Lebanon, on the other hand, were a community with a dream of independence that was being realised under the French. Therefore, Greater Lebanon was the exception among the newly-formed states.

It took France three years, from 1920 to 1923, to gain full control over Syria and to quell all the insurgencies that broke out, notably in the Alawite territories, Mount Druze and Aleppo.

Although there were uprisings in the different states, France deliberately gave different ethnic and religious groups in the Levant their own lands in the hope of prolonging its rule. The French hoped to fragment the various groups in the region and to mitigate support for the Syrian nationalist movement, which sought to end colonial rule. The administration of the state governments was heavily dominated by the French. Local authorities were given very little power and did not have the authority to decide policy independently. The small amount of power that local leaders had could easily be overruled by French officials. The French did everything in their power to prevent people in the Levant from developing self-sufficient governing bodies.

Diagram of states under the mandate

Beirut Vilayet and Mount Lebanon	Aleppo Vilayet	Damascus Vilayet	Zor Sanjak
OETA North	OETA East
Kingdom of Syria (1920)
Greater Lebanon (1920–46)	Alawite State (1920–36)	State of Aleppo (including the Sanjak of Alexandretta) (1920–24)	State of Damascus (1920–24)	Jabal Druze (1921–36)
State of Syria (1925–30)
Syrian Republic (1930–58)
Hatay State (1938–39)
Lebanon	Turkey	Syria

=== State of Greater Lebanon ===
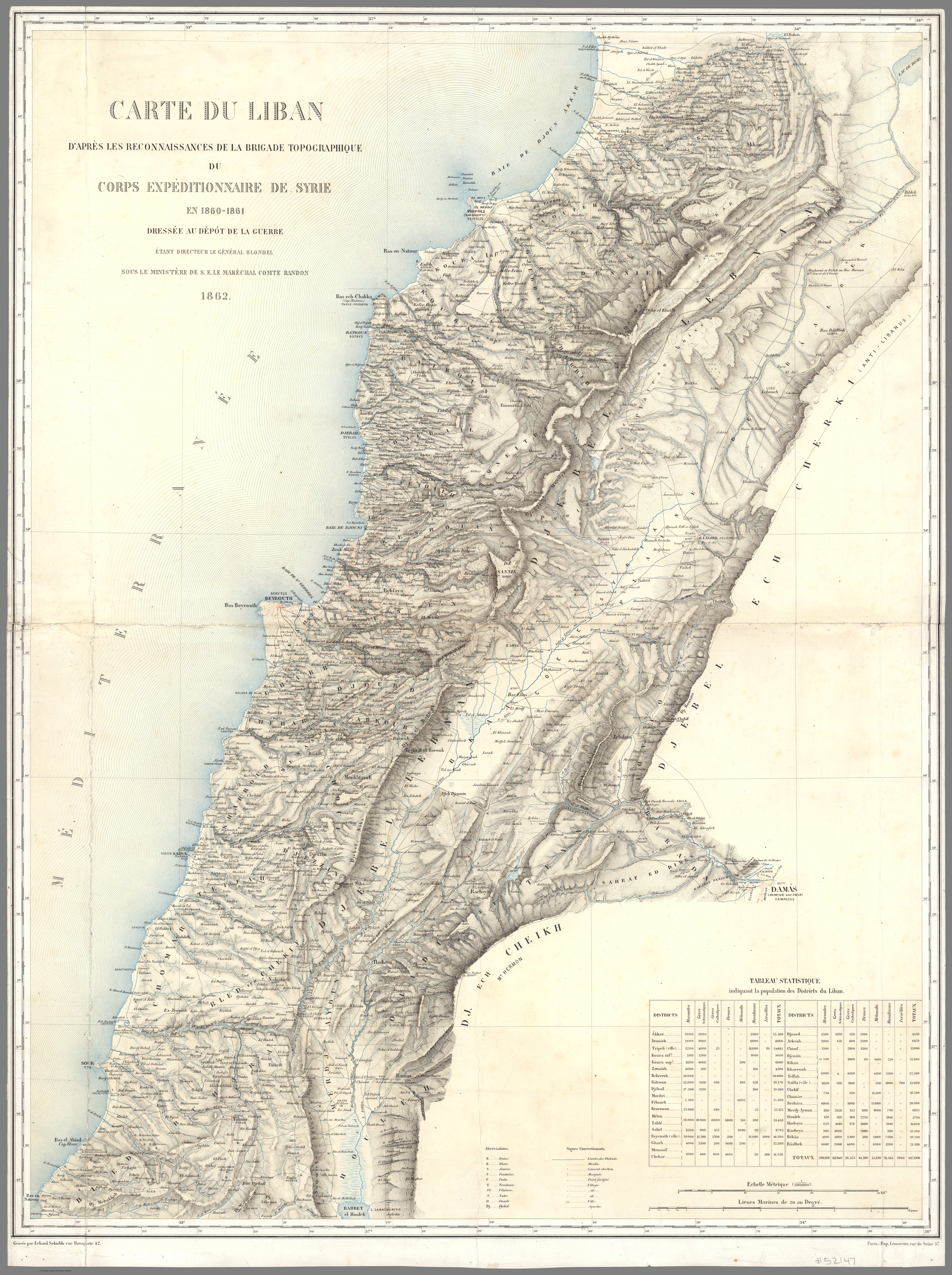
1862 map drawn by the French expedition of Beaufort d'Hautpoul

Black dashed line shows the borders of the 1861–1918 Mount Lebanon Mutasarrifate

The first map, drawn by the French in 1862, was used as a template for the 1920 borders of Greater Lebanon. The second map shows the borders of the 1861–1918 Mount Lebanon Mutasarrifate, overlaid on a map of modern-day Lebanon showing religious groups distribution

On 3 August 1920, Arrêté 299 of the Haut-commissariat de la République française en Syrie et au Liban linked the cazas of Hasbaya, Rachaya, Maallaka and Baalbeck to what was then known as the Autonomous Territory of Lebanon. Then, on 31 August 1920, General Gouraud signed Arrêté 318, delimiting the State of Greater Lebanon, with explanatory notes stating that Lebanon would be treated separately from the rest of Syria. On 1 September 1920, General Gouraud publicly proclaimed the creation of the State of Greater Lebanon (French: État du Grand Liban, Arabic: دولة لبنان الكبير) at a ceremony in Beirut.

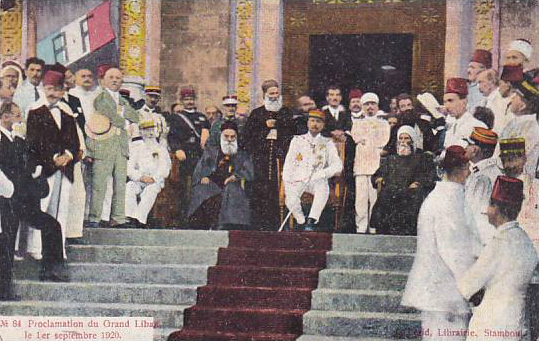
General Gourard proclaims the creation of the State of Greater Lebanon

Greater Lebanon was created by France to be a "safe haven" for the Maronite population of the mutasarrifia (Ottoman administrative unit) of Mount Lebanon, an area with a Maronite majority that had enjoyed varying degrees of autonomy during the Ottoman era. However, in addition to the Maronite Mutasarrifia, other, mainly Muslim, regions were added, forming "Greater" Lebanon. Those regions correspond today to North Lebanon, South Lebanon, Biqa' valley, and Beirut. The capital of Greater Lebanon was Beirut. The new state was granted a flag that merged the French flag with the cedar of Lebanon. The Maronites were the majority in Lebanon and managed to preserve their independence, which created a unique precedent in the Arab world, as Lebanon was the first Arab country in which Christians were not a minority. The State of Greater Lebanon existed until 23 May 1926, when it became the Lebanese Republic.

Most of the Muslims in Greater Lebanon rejected the new state upon its creation. Some believe that the continuous Muslim demand for reunification with Syria eventually brought about an armed conflict between Muslims and Christians in 1958, when Lebanese Muslims wanted to join the newly proclaimed United Arab Republic between Egypt and Syria, which was strongly opposed by Lebanese Christians. However, most members of the Lebanese Muslim communities and their political elites ahd become committed to the idea of being Lebanese citizens by the late 1930s even though they also tended to continue to nurture Arab nationalist sentiments.

=== State of Alawites ===
On 19 August 1920, General Gouraud signed Arrêté 314, which added to the autonomous Sandjak of Alexandretta the Cazas of Jisr el-Choughour, the madriyehs of Baher and Bujack (caza of Latakia), the Moudiriyeh of Kinsaba (Caza of Sahyoun) "with a view to the formation of the territories of Greater Lebanon and the Ansarieh Mountains", where the "Ansarieh Mountains" area was to become the Alawite State. On 31 August 1920, the same day that the decree creating Greater Lebanon was signed, General Gouraud signed Arrêté 319 delimiting the State of Alawites, and Arrêté 317 adding the caza of Massyaf (Omranie) into the new State.

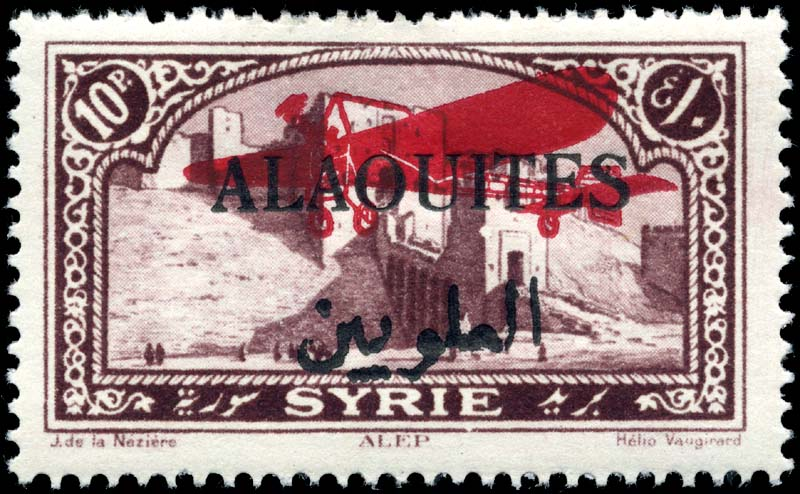
A 10-piastre Syrian stamp used in the Alawite State, bearing an overprint overprinted "ALAOUITES"

The Alawite State (French: État des Alaouites, Arabic: دولة العلويين) was located on the Syrian coast and incorporated a majority of Alawites, a branch of Shia Islam. It capital was the port city of Latakia. Initially, it was an autonomous territory under French rulem known as the "Alawite Territories". It became part of the Syrian Federation in 1922, but left the federation again in 1924 and became the "Alawaite State". On 22 September 1930, it was renamed the "Independent Government of Latakia". The population at this time was 278,000. The government of Latakia finally joined the Syrian Republic on 5 December 1936. The state witnessed several rebellions against the French, including that of Salih al-Ali (1918–1920).

On 28 June 1922, Arrêté 1459 created a "Federation of the Autonomous States of Syria", which included the State of Aleppo, the State of Damascus and the Alawite State. However, two-and-a-half years later, on 5 December 1924, Arrêté 2979 and Arrêté 2980 established the Alawite State as an independent state, with Latakia as its capital, and separately unified the States of Aleppo and Damascus into the "État de Syrie" ("State of Syria"), which was formally established on 1 January 1925.

In 1936, both Jebel Druze State and the Alawite State were incorporated into the State of Syria.

=== State of Syria ===
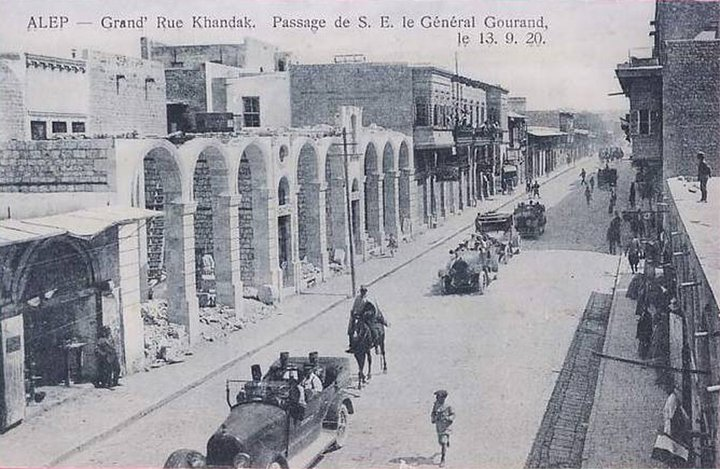
General Gouraud crossing through al-Khandaq street on 13 September 1920, Aleppo

On 1 September 1920, one day after the creation of Greater Lebanon and the Alawite State, Arrêté 330 separated out of the previous "Gouvernement de Damas" ("Government of Damascus") an independent government known as the "Gouvernement d'Alep" ("Government of Aleppo"), including the autonomous sandjak of Alexandretta, which retained its administrative autonomy. The terms "Gouvernement d'Alep" "Gouvernement de Damas" were used interchangeably with "l'État d'Alep" and "l'État de Damas" – for example, Arrete 279 1 October 1920 stated in its preamble: "Vu l'arrêté No 330 du 1er Septembre 1920 créant l'État d'Alep".

The State of Aleppo (1920–1925, French: État d'Alep, Arabic: دولة حلب) included a majority of Sunni Muslims. It covered northern Syria in addition to the entire fertile basin of the Euphrates River, in eastern Syria. Those regions represented much of the agricultural and mineral wealth of Syria. The autonomous Sanjak of Alexandretta was added to the State of Aleppo in 1923. The capital was the northern city of Aleppo, which had large Christian and Jewish communities, in addition to the Sunni Muslims. The state also incorporated minorities of Shiites and Alawites. Ethnic Kurds and Assyrians inhabited the eastern regions alongside the Arabs. The General Governors of the state were Kamil Pasha al-Qudsi (1920–1922) Mustafa Bey Barmada (1923) and Mar'i Pasha Al Mallah (1924-1925).

The State of Damascus was a French mandate from 1920 to 1925; its capital was Damascus.

The primarily Sunni populations of the States of Aleppo and Damascus strongly opposed the division of Syria, which resulted in its quick end in 1925, when France united the States of Aleppo and Damascus into the State of Syria.

==== Sanjak of Alexandretta ====
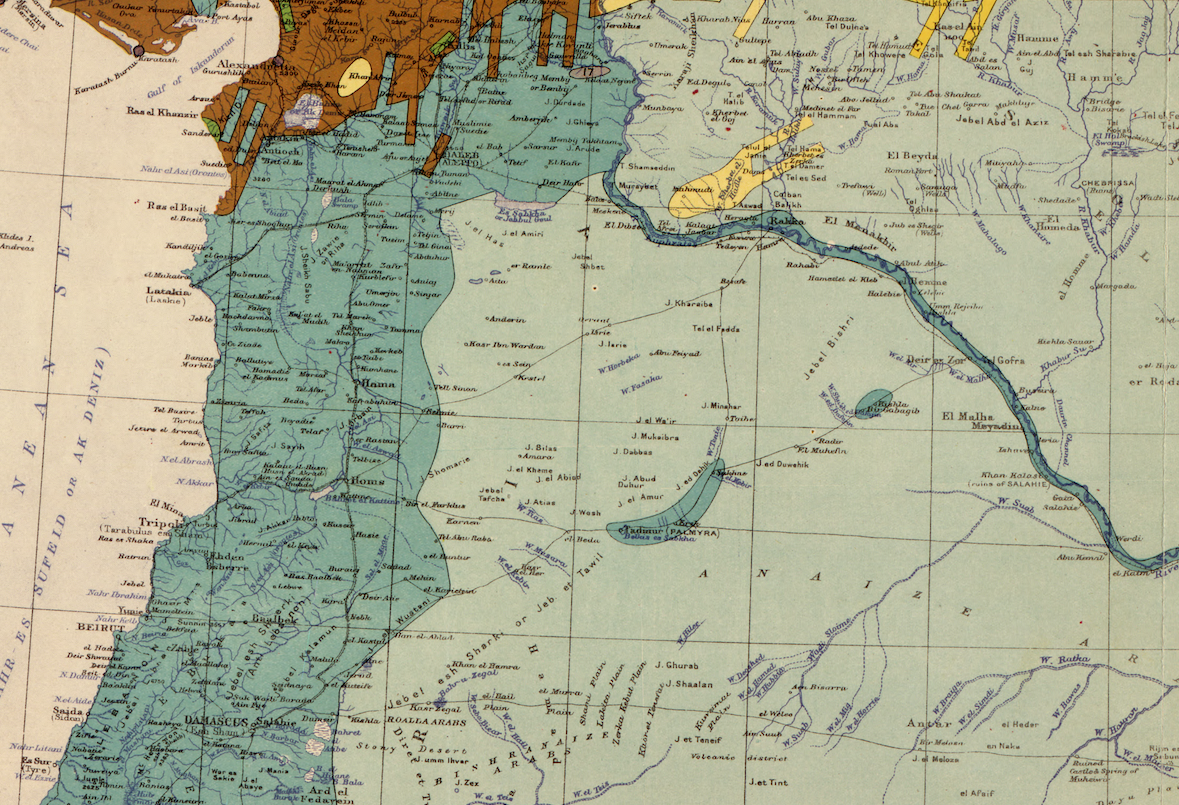
Ethnographical map of Syria and Lebanon in a pre-World War I ethnographical map. The blue color represents Arabs, brown Turks, green Armenians, and yellow Kurds.

The Sanjak of Alexandretta became an autonomous province of Syria under Article 7 of the French-Turkish Treaty of 20 October 1921: "A special administrative regime shall be established for the district of Alexandretta. The Turkish inhabitants of this district shall enjoy facility for their cultural development. The Turkish language shall have official recognition".

In 1923, Alexandretta was attached to the State of Aleppo, and in 1925, it was directly attached to the French mandate of Syria, still with special administrative status. The sanjak was given autonomy in November 1937 in an arrangement brokered by the League. Under its new statute, the sanjak became "distinct but not separated" from the French Mandate of Syria on the diplomatic level and was linked to both France and Turkey for defence matters.

In 1938, the Turkish military went into the Syrian province and expelled most of its Alawite Arab and Armenian inhabitants. Before this, Alawi Arabs and Armenians were the majority of Alexandretta's population.

The allocation of seats in the sanjak's assembly was based on the 1938 census, held by the French authorities under international supervision. The assembly was appointed in the summer of 1938, and the French-Turkish Treaty settling the status of the Sanjak was signed on 4 July 1938.

On 2 September 1938, the assembly proclaimed the Sanjak of Alexandretta as the Hatay State. The republic lasted for one year under joint French and Turkish military supervision. The name Hatay itself was proposed by Kemal Atatürk and the government was under Turkish control. In 1939, after a popular referendum, the Hatay State became a Turkish province.

=== State of Jabal Druze ===
On 24 October 1922, Arrêté 1641 established the État autonome du Djebel druze ("Autonomous State of Jabal Druze")

It was created for the Druze population of southern Syria. It had a population of some 50,000 and its capital in As-Suwayda.

In 1936, both the Jebel Druze and the Alawite States were incorporated into the State of Syria.

== Demands for autonomy rejected by French authorities ==
=== Al-Jazira Province ===
In an effort to quench the Arab nationalist movement and demand, the French mandate authorities had encouraged Kurds to immigrate to Syria and supported their political demands. Part of the effort was carried out through the Terrier Plan, which was aimed at promoting Kurdish cultural and political presence and influence in northeastern Syria. In 1936–1937, there was some autonomist agitation among Assyrians and Kurds, supported by some Bedouins, in the province of Al-Jazira. Its partisans wanted the French troops to stay in the province in the event of a Syrian independence, as they feared that the nationalist Damascus government would replace minority officials by Muslim Arabs from the capital. The French authorities refused to consider any new status of autonomy inside Syria.

=== Golan Region ===
In Quneitra and the Golan Region, there was a sizeable Circassian community. For the same reasons as their Assyrian, Kurdish and Bedouin counterparts in Al-Jazira province in 1936–1937, several Circassian leaders wanted a special autonomy status for their region in 1938, as they feared the prospect of living in an independent Syrian republic under a nationalist Arab government hostile towards the minorities. They also wanted the Golan region to become a national homeland for Circassian refugees from the Caucasus. A Circassian battalion served in the French Army of the Levant and had helped it against the Arab nationalist uprisings. As in Al-Jazira Province, the French authorities refused to grant any autonomy status to the Golan Circassians.

== Economy ==
In 1921, the French already wanted to develop the agricultural sector, and a feasibility study of the Union Economique de Syrie the North-East of Syria and the Alawite State were deemed profitable for the cultivation of cotton. Investments began in 1924, but it took until the 1930s to produce more than the level that had been reached in 1925. Due to the high economic integration of the region, a trade separation would have harmed both mandates.

To maintain the economic ties that had been established in the region under the Ottomans, the British and the French agreed to a customs-free zone between their mandates in 1921 even though that decision was protested by French manufacturers. The populations of Palestine, Syria and Lebanon were strongly in favour of the customs-free zone and successfully protested a possible abolition in 1927. That affected: local and imported goods, processed goods and goods currently in transit. By 1933, Palestine was the largest importer of Syrian goods, and the French held a share of 7.5% of the imports. Between the two World Wars, France became the largest trader of goods of the French Mandate. From 1933 onwards, Japan was also a large source for imports.

== Kingdom of Syria (1918–1920) ==
=== Heads of Government ===
Name	Term start	Term end	Political Party
Muhammad Said al-Jazairi	30 September 1918	30 September 1918	
'Ali Rida Basha al-Rikabi	30 September 1918	5 October 1918	
Emir Faisal	5 October 1918	8 March 1920	

=== King ===
Name	Reign Start	Reign end
Faisal I	8 March 1920	28 July 1920

== French Mandate of Syria (1920–1939) ==
=== Acting Heads of State ===
Name	Term start	Term end	Political Party
Aladdin Al-Droubi	28 July 1920	21 August 1920	
Jamil al-Ulshi	4 September 1920	30 November 1920	

=== President ===
Name	Term start	Term end	Political Party
Subhi Bay Barakat al-Khalidi	28 June 1922	1 January 1925	

=== Heads of State ===
Name	Term start	Term end	Political Party
Subhi Bay Barakat al-Khalidi	1 January 1925	21 December 1925	
François Pierre-Alype (acting)	9 February 1926	28 April 1926	
Damad-i Shariyari Ahmad Nami Bay	28 April 1926	15 February 1928	
Taj al-Din al-Hasani (acting)	15 February 1928	19 November 1931	
Léon Solomiac (acting)	19 November 1931	11 June 1932	

=== Presidents ===
Name	Term start	Term end	Political Party
Muhammad 'Ali Bay al-'Abid	11 June 1932	21 December 1936	
Hashim al-Atassi (1st time)	21 December 1936	7 July 1939	National Bloc

== High Commissioners ==
- 26 November 1919 – 23 November 1922: Henri Gouraud
- 23 November 1922 – 17 April 1923: Robert de Caix (acting)
- 19 April 1923 – 29 November 1924: Maxime Weygand
- 29 November 1924 – 23 December 1925: Maurice Sarrail
- 23 December 1925 – 23 June 1926: Henry de Jouvenel
- August 1926 – 16 July 1933: Auguste Henri Ponsot
- 16 July 1933 – January 1939: Damien de Martel
- January 1939 – Nov 1940: Gabriel Puaux
- 24 November 1940 – 27 November 1940: Jean Chiappe (died on flight to take office)
- 6 December 1940 – 16 June 1941: Henri Dentz
- 24 June 1941 – 7 June 1943: Georges Catroux
- 7 June 1943 – 23 November 1943: Jean Helleu
- 23 November 1943 – 23 January 1944: Yves Chataigneau
- 23 January 1944 – 1 September 1946: Paul Beynet

== See also ==
- French colonial empire
- French colonial flags
- French Lebanese
- List of French possessions and colonies
- Modern history of Syria
