= Mustafa Bey Barmada =

Syrian Statesman

Mustafa Bey Barmada مصطفى بك برمدا
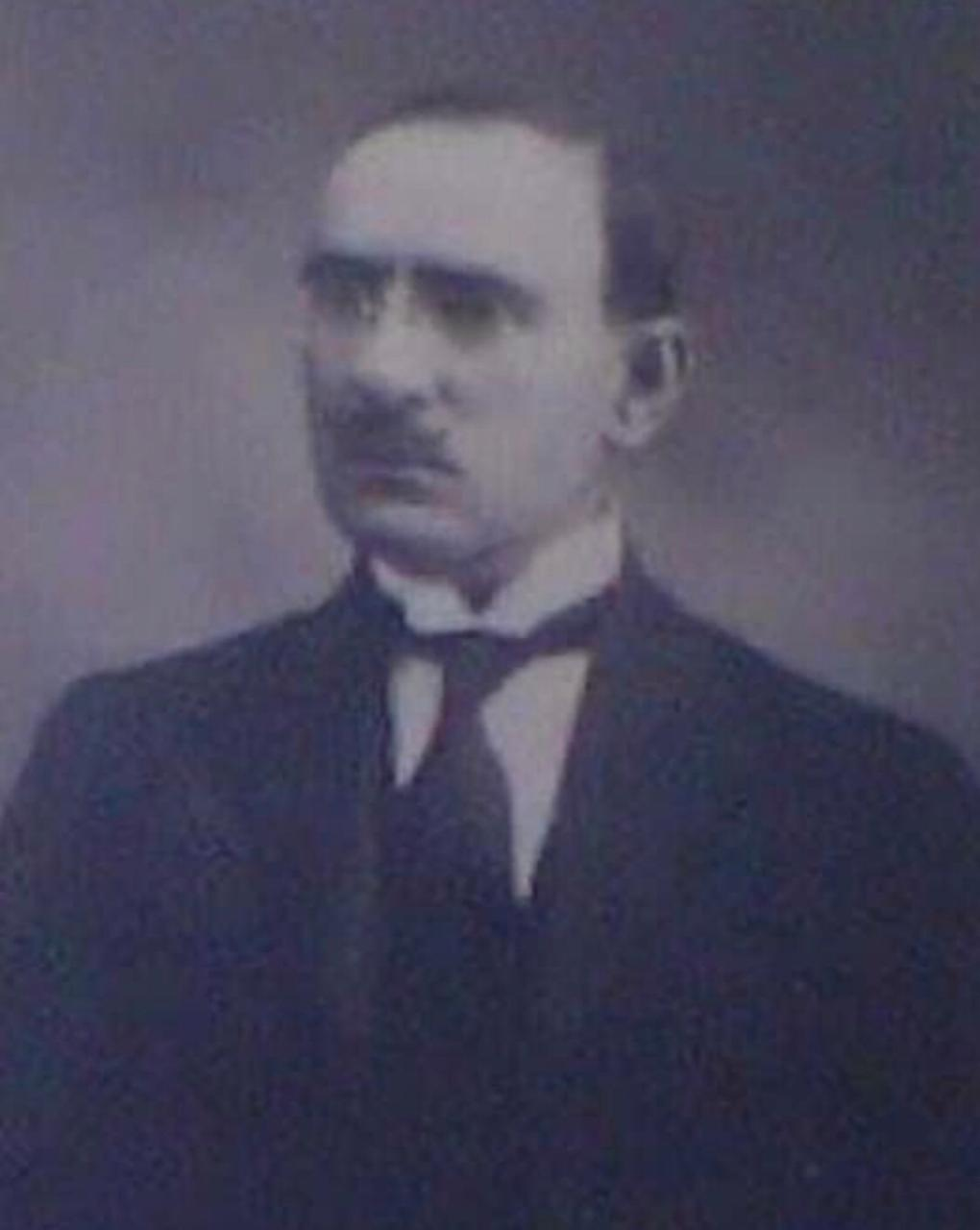
- Mustafa Bey Barmada, 1923

2nd Governor General of the State of Aleppo
- In office March 1923 – 5 January 1924
- Preceded by: Kamil Pasha al-Qudsi
- Succeeded by: Mar'i Pasha Al Mallah

President of Court of Cassation

Personal details
- Born: 1883 Aleppo, Ottoman Syria
- Died: April 2, 1953 (aged 69–70) Damascus, Syria
- Resting place: Harem, Syria
- Children: Mahmud Barmada; Salah Barmada; Sana Barmada; Nizar Barmada
- Education: University of Istanbul
- Profession: Judge, politician

Mustafa Bey Barmada (Arabic: مصطفى برمدا; 1883 – April 2, 1953) was a Syrian statesman, politician and judge; served as the Governor General of the State of Aleppo between 1923 and 1924 and headed the Judiciary of Syria between 1930s and 1940s.

== Early life and education ==
Mustafa Bey Barmada was born in 1883 in Aleppo to a notable Syrian family and the landlords of Harem. Son of Sadiq Barmada.

Educated first in Aleppo and later studied law at Istanbul University.

== Career ==
Began his professional career as a teacher in Aleppo and then moved to Beirut to teach law. Later, he was appointed as Public prosecutor in Aleppo and then as a member of the Damascus High court of Appeal.

In 1921, Barmada became the president of the Aleppo high court of Appeals.

In March 1923, Barmada was named as Governor-General of the State of Aleppo (1923–1924) under the French Mandate of Syria after Kamil Pasha al-Qudsi. Barmada, the Istanbul-trained legal expert resigned as a Governor on January 5, 1924, after eight months in office because he obstructed the implementation of French policies. His resignation – reportedly because he did not accept the French plan to replace gold as the Monetary exchange with paper currency.

In 1924, Barmada became the President of the Aleppo Lawyers Syndicate but after five months the French mandate in Syria sacked him from the position because he refused to obey the High Commissioner.

In 1939, President Hashim Al- Atassi appointed Mustafa Barmada as the prime minister of Syria after the resignation of Lutfi al-Haffar, But Barmada has decided to decline the office and stay in his position as the President of the Court of Cassation (the leading authority on the Syrian Judiciary).

In 1947, Mustafa Barmada was elected as a member of the Syrian parliament for Aleppo and he was elected as the chairman of the parliamentary committee.

In 1948, Mustafa Barmada with other Aleppo Leaders such as Rushdi al-Kikhya and Nazim al-Qudsi formed the People's party.

In 1948, Mustafa Barmada refused the offer to be the prime minister of Syria from the president Shukri Al-Quwwatli, after the resignation of Jammil Mardam.

== Death ==
Mustafa Bey Barmada died on April 2, 1953, in Damascus, Syria.
