= Kamil Pasha al-Qudsi =

Syrian politician (?–1926)

- كامل باشا القدسي

1st Governor General of the State of Aleppo
- In office 1920–1922
- Preceded by: Office established
- Succeeded by: Mustafa Bey Barmada

Personal details
- Born: 1849 Aleppo, Ottoman Syria, Ottoman Empire
- Died: 1926 (aged 76–77) Aleppo, French Mandate of Syria

Kamil Pasha al-Qudsi (Arabic: كامل باشا القدسي) ; (1845– 1926) was a Syrian statesman who served as the first Governor General of the State of Aleppo between 1920 and 1922.
