= Henri Verne =

French art historian (1880–1949)

Henri Jean François Joseph Verne (21 September 1880, Cannes – 11 February 1949, Paris) was a French museum director and curator.

== Biography ==
He held degrees in literature and law. In 1906, he became a document editor at the Ministry of Trade and Industry. From 1911 to 1939, he worked for the Secretariat at the Ministry of Foreign Affairs, originally as an editor then, from 1915, as head of the Secretariat. He was named a Knight in the Legion of Honor in 1921.

In 1925, he was appointed Director of the Musées Nationaux (Musée du Louvre, Musée du Luxembourg, Musée des Antiquités Nationales, and the Château de Versailles). The following year, he drafted a plan for reorganizing the collections at the Louvre, and modernizing the museum; known as "Le plan Verne". It primarily involved categorizing and displaying the collection by styles and periods. This included sending the Louvre's Far Eastern art to the Musée Guimet, in exchange for their Egyptian art. He also requested that the Ministry of Finance vacate spaces they had occupied since the 1870s.

The modernization program began by replacing the museum's oil lamps with electric lighting. In 1927, he ordered the Conservatoire national des arts et métiers to make an analysis of the paints. Shortly after, thanks to a contribution from two wealthy Argentinians, the Louvre established its own laboratory; now known as the Centre de recherche et de restauration des musées de France.

In 1937, he was elected to the Académie des Beaux-Arts, where he took Seat #8 in the "Unattached" section. The following year, anticipating the war, he helped to devise a plan for transferring some of the museum's most vulnerable and valuable pieces to the relative safety of the Château de Chambord. Many of his original proposals were not fully carried out until well after the war.

== Sources ==
- Pierre Rosenberg, Dictionnaire amoureux du Louvre, pg.869, Plon, Paris, 2007 ISBN 978-2-259-20403-3
- Biographical data and references @ AGORHA
- Biographical data from the Committee of Historical and Scientific Works @ La France Savante
- "D’un Louvre moderne : le projet d’Henri Verne" by Agnès Callu, from Autopsie du Musée @ OpenEdition.org
