= Consulate General of France, Saint Petersburg =

Consulate-General of France in Saint Petersburg Генеральное Консульство Франции в Санкт-Петербурге General'noe Konsul'stvo frantsii v Sankt-Peterburge Consulat Général de France à Saint-Pétersbourg
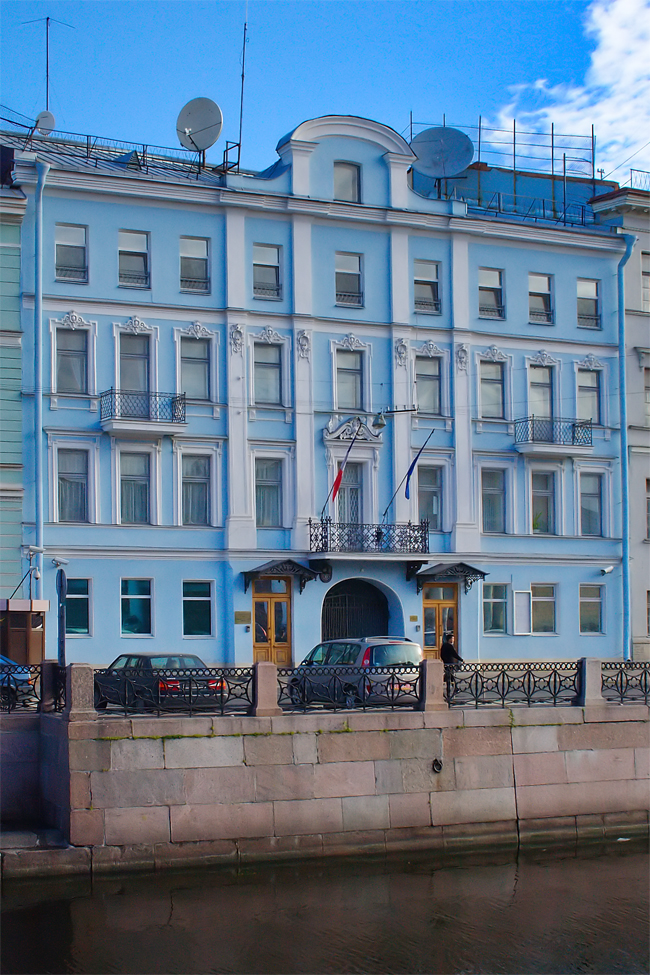
- Location: Saint Petersburg
- Address: 15 Moika River Embankment
- Coordinates: 59°56′32.67959″N 30°19′24.2106″E

The Consulate-General of France in Saint Petersburg is the diplomatic mission of France in Saint Petersburg, Russian Federation. It is located at 15 Moika River Embankment (Russian: Набережная реки Мойки, дом 15) in the Tsentralny District in Saint Petersburg.

== History of the building ==
The first references to 15 Moika River Embankment in the Central State Historical Archives of Saint Petersburg indicate that a neo-classicism three-story stone house was on the site, when in 1858 the owner, Major-General Seyffarth, commissioned architect A.C. Kolb to reconstruct the existing structure and add an additional floor. The symmetrical facade with the balcony on the second floor and pediment were kept in the redesign, although a portico in classical Corinthian order style was removed. The facade was redesigned to match the architectural style of the 18th century.

In the 1860s, poet of the Golden Age Prince Pyotr Andreyevich Vyazemsky lived in the house, and in the 1890s, painter Arkady Alexandrovich Rylov was reported to have called the house home. French novelist and playwright Honoré de Balzac also lived in the house for a period. In 1911 Countess Fekla Pavlovna Stackelberg purchased the house and kept the design unchanged, and rented out the apartments.

In 1970 the building underwent extensive renovations which saw a one-storey building in the north-west quadrant being built and yard constructions being dismantled. In 1972 the consulate-general of France occupied the building and has been located in it since.

== Role of the consulate-general ==
The consulate-general is attached to the Embassy of France in Moscow and services the Northwest consular district, which includes Saint Petersburg, Leningrad Oblast, Republic of Karelia, Murmansk Oblast, Arkhangelsk Oblast, Pskov Oblast, Kaliningrad Oblast, Vologda Oblast and Novgorod Oblast. The consulate-general offers consular assistance to citizens of France, whilst promoting trade and cultural ties between the French people and businesses and their counterparts in Saint Petersburg.
