= Yves Chataigneau =

French diplomat and colonial governor

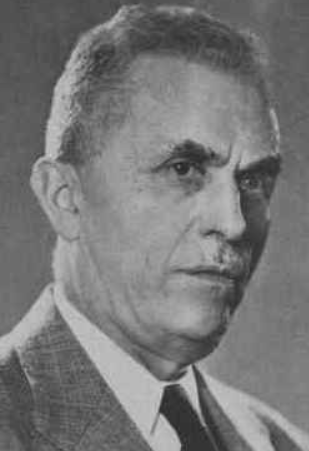

General Delegate of Free France in the Levant
- In office 23 November 1943 – 23 January 1944
- Preceded by: Jean Helleu
- Succeeded by: Paul Beynet

French governor of Algeria
- In office 8 September 1944 – 11 February 1948
- Preceded by: Georges Catroux
- Succeeded by: Marcel-Edmond Naegelen

Personal details
- Born: Yves Jean Joseph Chataigneau; 22 September 1891 Vouillé, Vienne, France
- Died: 4 March 1969 (aged 77) Paris, France
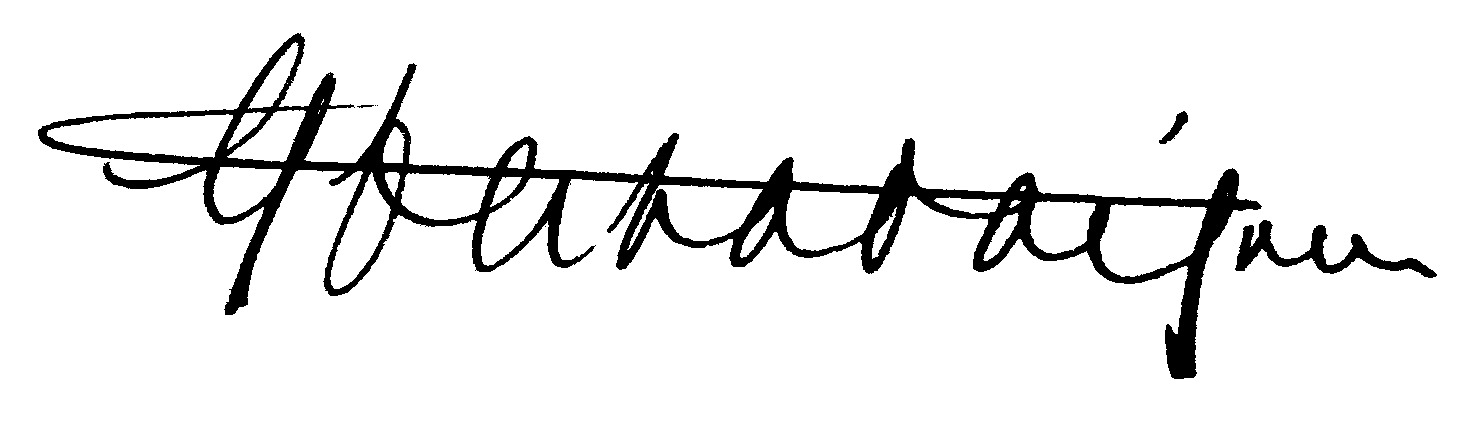
- Signature

Yves Jean Joseph Chataigneau (22 September 1891 – 4 March 1969) was a French diplomat and colonial governor.

Graduating in history and geography, in 1919 after having been a lieutenant during the First World War, he began his career in diplomacy. In 1937, he was secretary general of the presidency of the council and was General Delegate of Free France in the Levant from 1943 to 1944, governor general of Algeria from September 8, 1944, to February 11, 1948, French ambassador to Moscow and diplomatic adviser to the government from 1949 to 1954. He was elected a member of the Academy of Moral and Political Sciences in 1967.

In General de Gaulle's Memoirs of War, Chataigneau is designated as the man of the repression of Sétif, but he was not even in Algeria at the time of the events. Moreover, he was so appreciated by the Algerians that they nicknamed him Mohammed. According to Jean Lacouture, he had to bear the responsibility for a repression decided upon by his subordinates in a completely different spirit than his.
