= Gabriel Puaux =

French diplomat and politician

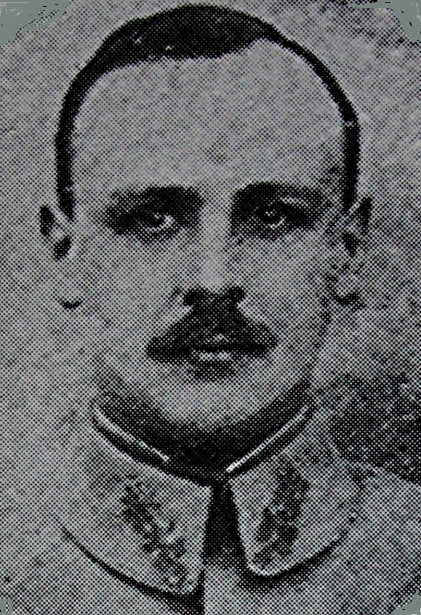
- French diplomat and politician

High Commissioner of the Levant
- In office 22 October 1938 – November 1940
- Preceded by: Damien de Martel
- Succeeded by: Jean Chiappe

Personal details
- Born: May 19, 1883 Paris, France
- Died: January 1, 1970 (aged 86) Kitzbühel, Austria
- Occupation: Diplomat
- Known for: High Commissioner of the Levant in Morocco and Tunisia

Gabriel Puaux (French pronunciation: [ɡabʁijɛl pɥo]; May 19, 1883, in Paris – January 1, 1970, in Kitzbühel, Austria) was a French diplomat and politician.

== Biography ==
Puaux, son of the Protestant pastor Frank Puaux, earned a bachelor's degree in addition to his postgraduate education of law. In 1908, he became the French Ambassador in Bern, Switzerland. Afterwards, he was the French Ambassador in Tunisia from 1907 to 1912. He later joined the French Army and received several honorable medals.

Puaux returned to Tunisia and became the Secretary General of the French government from 1919 to 1922. He served as the French ambassador in Lithuania, Romania, and Austria. Puaux was also the High Commissioner of the Levant from October 22, 1938, till 1940. In June 1943, he became the resident general of France in Morocco and held that position until March 1946. In the Senate of France, he was the representative of the French residents residing in Tunisia from May 29, 1952, till April 26, 1959. He was elected as a member of the French Académie des Sciences Morales et Politiques in 1951.

== See also ==
- High Commissioner of the Levant
