= Jean Chiappe =

French civil servant (1878-1940)

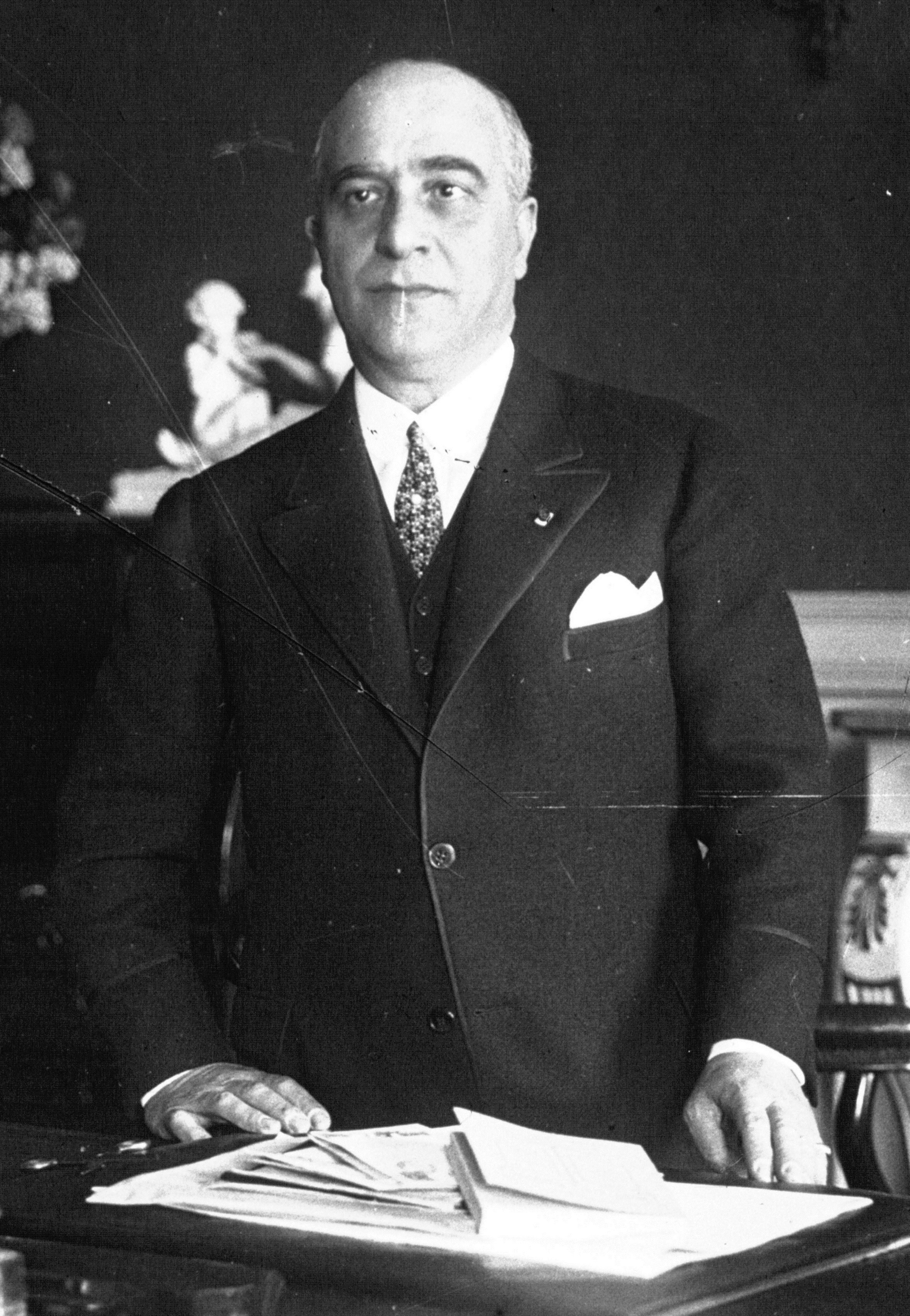
- Chiappe in 1927

High Commissioner of the Levant (died before taking office)
- Preceded by: Gabriel Puaux
- Succeeded by: Henri Dentz

Paris Police Prefect
- In office 1927–1934

Personal details
- Born: Jean Baptiste Pascal Eugène Chiappe; 3 May 1878 Ajaccio, France
- Died: 27 November 1940 (aged 62)

Jean Baptiste Pascal Eugène Chiappe (3 May 1878 – 27 November 1940) was a high-ranking French civil servant.

== Career ==
Chiappe was director of the Sûreté générale in the 1920s. He was subsequently given the post of Préfet de police in the 1930s, a role in which he was very popular. His politics tended towards the right, and successive leftist governments tried in vain to dislodge him.

Finally, on 3 February 1934, Édouard Daladier, new president of the Conseil, recalled him from his post. The far-right leagues promptly organized a large demonstration of support on 6 February 1934, which rapidly degenerated into a riot against the republic and the government.

This disturbance is referenced in Luis Buñuel's film Diary of a Chambermaid (1964). At the denouement of the film, right-wing protesters are seen chanting Vive Chiappe! outside the café owned by a sympathizer in Cherbourg. This was Buñuel's payback for Chiappe's role in banning the Buñuel-Dalí film L'Age d'Or (1930), when Chiappe was the Paris Police Prefect.

In autumn 1940, Chiappe was made high-commissioner of Vichy France in the Levant. The aircraft taking him to Lebanon was shot down by mistake by the Royal Italian Air Force taking part in the Battle of Cape Spartivento near Sardinia. The pilot, Henri Guillaumet, the other members of the crew including Marcel Reine, and the two passengers, Chiappe and the head of his private office, were killed.
