= Ahmad Nami =

Lebanese politician (1873–1962)

- أحمد نامي
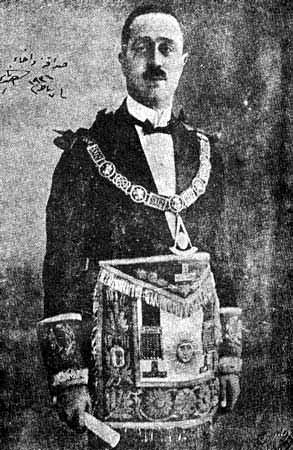
- Ahmad Nami dressed in full Masonic attire in 1925

President of Syria
- In office 28 April 1926 – 15 February 1928
- Preceded by: Subhi Bey Barakat
- Succeeded by: Taj al-Din al-Hasani

Prime Minister of Syria
- In office 28 April 1926 – 15 February 1928
- Preceded by: Subhi Bey Barakat
- Succeeded by: Taj al-Din al-Hasani

Personal details
- Born: Ahmed Nami; 1873 Beirut, Beirut Vilayet, Ottoman Empire
- Died: 13 December 1962 (aged 88–89) Beirut, Lebanon
- Party: Independent
- Spouse: Ayşe Sultan (m. 1910; div. 1921)
- Children: 3

"Al-Damad" Ahmad Nami or "Damat" Ahmet Nami (Arabic: أحمد نامي, romanized: Aḥmad Nāmī; 1873 – 13 December 1962) was an Ottoman prince (damat), the prime minister of Syria and president of Syria (1926–28), and a lecturer of history and politics.

== Early life ==
Ahmad Nami was born in 1873 in Beirut to an affluent family related to the Ottoman dynasty. He was of Turkish and Circassian origin, and his father Fakhri Bey was governor of Beirut during the Ottoman rule.

Nami studied in the Ottoman Military Academy and received military training in Paris. He married Ayşe Sultan, a daughter of Sultan Abdul Hamid II in 1910. By 1909, the family was forced into exile in France when Nami's father-in-law, the Sultan, was overthrown by the Young Turks. Nami moved back to Beirut in 1918 where he administered his family’s enterprises.

In July 1920, the French officers in the region delegated Nami to form a government in Syria and gave him limited presidential powers. By April 28, 1926, Nami created his official cabinet and appointed Husni al-Barazi as Minister of Interior, Faris al-Khury as Minister of Education, and Lutfi al-Haffar as Minister of Commerce. However, in June 1926 the ministers all resigned from their posts to protest the French policies toward their nationalist movement; they were then arrested by the French High Commissioner of the Levant Henry de Jouvenel. Nami sought to secure their release but was threatened by imprisonment, causing him to replace his cabinet with three pro-French politicians.

Nami worked relentlessly against the creation of an independent Lebanon, arguing for a wider regional framework to maintain Syrian unity. He also sought to have a national army and requested entry into the League of Nations. Moreover, he demanded that the French compensate citizens whose homes had been destroyed during the Great Syrian Revolt of 1925–27, and that a general amnesty be announced to permit the return of Syrian exiles. However, the authorities in Paris objected to Nami’s ambitions and accused him of establishing a monarchy. Consequently, he was removed from the office on February 15, 1928.

In 1932, the French reconsidered creating a throne in Syria and appointing Nami as the king, though this plan never came to light. He was then considered a possible candidate for presidential office in 1940. However, the National Bloc objected to his leadership.

== Retirement ==
Nami retired from public life and moved to Lebanon in the 1940s. He occasionally travelled to France as a visiting lecturer on history and politics at the Sorbonne University.

He died on 13 December 1962.

== Personal life ==
Nami had two sons and a daughter from his marriage with the Ottoman princess Ayşe Sultan:

- Sultanzade Omer Nami Bey then Nami-Osmanoğlu (19 November 1911 – 17 March 1993). Born in Bebek Palace; died in Lausanne. He had two wives and one daughter.
- Aliye Namiye Hanımsultan (7 February 1913 – 9 April 1913). She died in infancy and was buried in mausoleum of Şehzade Ahmed Kemaleddin, Yayha Efendi cemetery.
- Sultanzade Osman Nami Bey then Nami-Osmanoğlu (13 January 1918 – 15 July 2010). Born in Geneva; died in Istanbul, and was buried in the mausoleum of Mahmud II;. He married twice and had five daughters.

His first language was Turkish and could hardly speak Arabic.

== Bibliography ==
- Khoury, Philip Shukry (2014). Syria and the French Mandate: The Politics of Arab Nationalism, 1920-1945. Princeton University Press. ISBN 9781400858392.
- Moubayed, Sami M. (2006). "Nami, Ahmad (1879-1960)". Steel & Silk: Men and Women Who Shaped Syria 1900-2000. Cune Press. ISBN 978-1-885942-40-1.
