= Damien de Martel =

French diplomat and politician

Count Damien de Martel
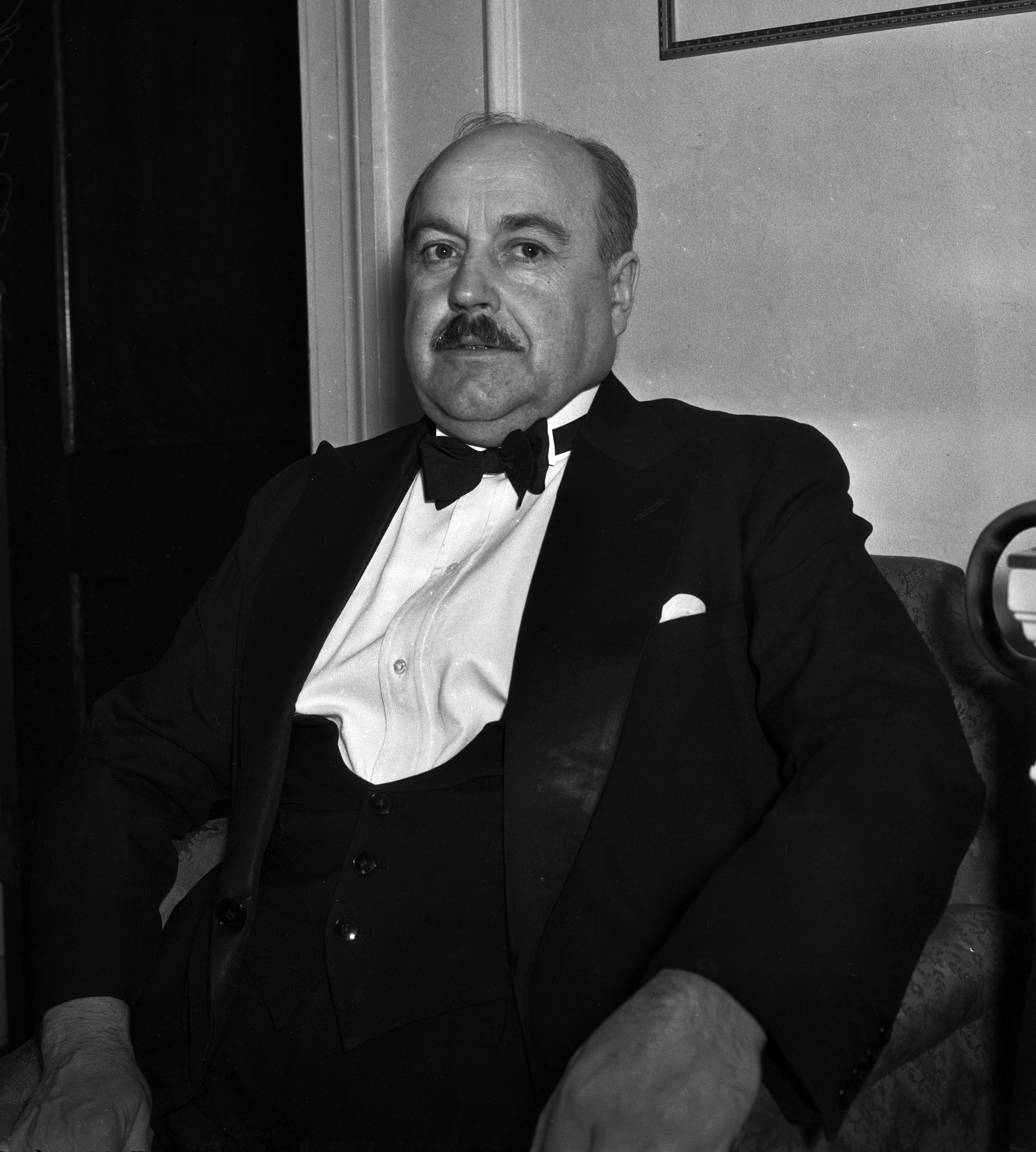
- Damien de Martel de Janville in 1932

High Commissioner of the Levant
- In office 16 July 1933 – 8 January 1939
- Preceded by: Henri Ponsot
- Succeeded by: Gabriel Puaux

Personal details
- Born: Damien Joseph Alfred Charles de Martel; 27 November 1878 Autruy-sur-Juine, France
- Died: 21 January 1940 (aged 61) Paris, France
- Awards: Commander of the Legion of Honour

Count Damien Joseph Alfred Charles de Martel (27 November 1878 – 21 January 1940) was a French diplomat who served as the 6th High Commissioner of the Levant from 1933 to 1939. During his career he was stationed in the United States, Soviet Union, China, and Japan.

== Early life and education ==
Damien Joseph Alfred Charles de Martel was born in Autruy-sur-Juine, France, on 27 November 1878. He graduated from the Sciences Po.

== Career ==
Martel passed the exam to enter the Ministry of Foreign Affairs in 1901, and became a consul trainee. He was promoted to deputy consul in 1904. He worked at the French embassy in Washington D.C. from October 1906 to October 1909, where he was secretary and then second secretary. He was attached to the American division of the Directorate of Political and Commercial Affairs until 1913. He served as the first secretary of the French legation in Beijing from 1913 to 1918.

Martel was a special envoy and then High Commissioner in Siberia starting in July 1918. He was sent to the Caucasus in February 1920, to serve as Commissioner of the Republic in Transcaucasia. He was appointed High Commissioner to Crimea with the title of High Commissioner to the government of Southern Russia on 28 August 1920. From October to November 1920, he was French Commissioner in Constantinople. In February 1921, he was appointed to the French embassy in Petrograd; however, he was not installed in his post until two months later, when he was assigned to the Latvian government as Envoy Extraordinary and Minister Plenipotentiary, as France recently recognized Latvia's independence.

In January 1925, Martel was appointed as Envoy Extraordinary and Minister Plenipotentiary to China. Martel proposed returning Guangzhouwan to China, but Governor-General of French Indochina Pierre Pasquier opposed this. Martel was appointed as the French Ambassador to Japan on 10 December 1929, but did not leave for Japan until 27 June 1930.

=== Syria ===
Henri Ponsot was replaced by Doyle as High Commissioner of the Levant in October 1933. Doyle held the position until November 1938.

The Chamber of Deputies was dissolved by Martel in 1934. He had the leaders of the National Bloc arrested in 1936.

Palmyra was declared a historical monument by Martel. Maurice Bérard, head of the Banque de Syrie et du Liban, suggested to Henri Verne, the director of the French National Museums, that a special exhibition on Syrian and Lebanese archaeological work since 1919 be held in 1939. Martel found the idea ill advised and that the exhibition could cause a "damaging press campaign depicting artifacts as fruit of plunder". The exhibition was never held.

== Personal life ==
Martel was awarded the Legion of Honour as a knight in 1913, officer in 1924, and commander in 1927. Martel retired on 1 February 1939. He died from a heart attack at his house in Rue La Boétie, Paris, on 21 January 1940.

== Works cited ==
=== Books ===
- Daam, Jasim (2023). Tourism and the Emergence of Nation-States in the Arab Eastern Mediterranean, 1920s-1930s. Leiden University Press. ISBN 9789087283919.
- Griswold, Sarah (2025). Resurrecting the Past: France's Forgotten Heritage Mandate. Cornell University Press. ISBN 9781501783326.

=== Journals ===
- Drémeaux, François (2024). "A Troublesome Territory: French Diplomacy in Hong Kong and the Question of Guangzhouwan during the Interwar Period". Journal of the Royal Asiatic Society Hong Kong Branch. 64. Royal Asiatic Society Hong Kong Branch: 69–90. doi:10.2307/27341946. JSTOR 27341946.

=== News ===
- "Count de Martel, French Diplomat; High Commissioner to Syrian Mandate From 1933 Until Recently Is Dead at 61 In Service For 39 Years Ex-Ambassador to Tokyo Also Held Posts in Washington, Petrograd and Peiping". The New York Times. 22 January 1940. Archived from the original on 21 November 2026.

=== Web ===
- "Fonds Damien de Martel" [Damien de Martel Fund] (in French). Ministry for Europe and Foreign Affairs. Archived from the original on 21 November 2026.
