= Henri Ponsot =

French diplomat (1877–1963)

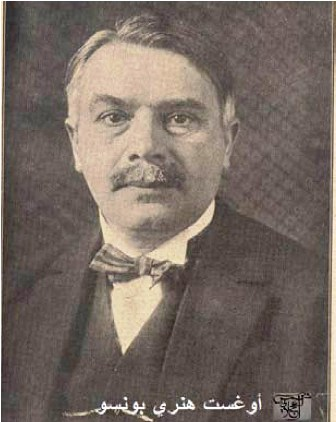

High Commissioner of the Levant
- In office August 1926 – 13 July 1933
- Preceded by: Henry de Jouvenel
- Succeeded by: Damien de Martel

Personal details
- Born: Auguste Henri Ponsot; 2 March 1877; Bologna, Kingdom of Italy
- Died: 5 October 1963 (aged 86)

Auguste Henri Ponsot (2 March 1877 – 5 October 1963) was a French politician and statesman.

== Life ==
Auguste Henri was born in Bologna, Italy. After law studies at the University of Dijon, Ponsot entered the diplomatic career in 1903. After having stayed in Siam, Berlin and Canada, he was appointed as the Secretary General of the Tunisian Government in 1922. Appointed to the Sub-Directorate of African Affairs, he negotiated with the Spain an agreement for a joint action in Morocco and lead the talks of Oujda in May 1925.

Ponsot became the French High Commissioner in Syria and Lebanon in August 1926 until 13 July 1933. Afterwards, he served as the French resident-general in Morocco from August 1933 to March 1936. From 1936 to 1938, Ponsot was the French Ambassador to Turkey in Ankara.

Later on, Ponsot led the discussions with Amin al-Husseini in which the French authorities expected an improvement in France's status in the Arab world through his intermediaries. After the World War II, Ponsot worked in Geneva to participate in the creation of the Office of the United Nations High Commissioner for Refugees. There he was in 1947 elected chairman of the International Refugee Organization and was also tasked with liquidating the organization in 1952. He remained in Geneva for seven years until his final retirement.

== See also ==
- High commissioner
- Mandate for Syria and the Lebanon
- Urbain Blanc
