= High Commissioner of the Levant =

Highest ranking authority in the Mandate for Syria and the Lebanon

- Haut-commissaire de France au Levant (French); المندوب السامي الفرنسي على سورية ولبنان (Arabic)

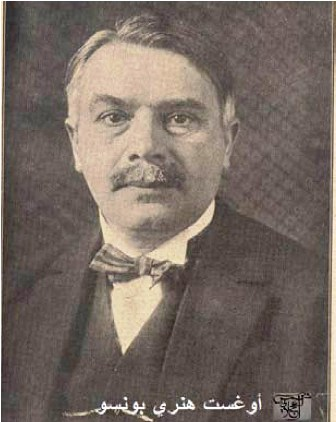
- Longest serving Henri Ponsot; August 1926 – 13 July 1933
- Seat: Pine Residence, Horsh district, Beirut
- Formation: 9 October 1919
- First holder: Henri Gouraud
- Final holder: Paul Beynet
- Abolished: 1 September 1946

The high commissioner of France in the Levant (French: haut-commissaire de France au Levant; Arabic: المندوب السامي الفرنسي على سورية ولبنان, romanized: almandub alsaami alfaransiu ealaa suriat walubnan), named after 1941 the general delegate of Free France in the Levant (French: délégué général de la France libre au Levant), was the highest ranking authority representing France (and Free France during World War II) in the French-mandated countries of Syria and Lebanon. Its office was based in the Pine Residence in Beirut, Lebanon (present-day official residence of the French ambassador in Lebanon).

== List of officeholders ==
=== High commissioners of France in the Levant ===
Portrait	Name	Term of office			Notes
Portrait	Name	Took office	Left office	Time in office	Notes
	Henri Gouraud	9 October 1919	23 November 1922	3 years, 45 days	
	Robert de Caix	23 November 1922	19 April 1923	147 days	Acting
	Maxime Weygand	19 April 1923	29 November 1924	1 year, 224 days	
	Maurice Sarrail	29 November 1924	23 December 1925	1 year, 24 days	
	Henry de Jouvenel	23 December 1925	23 June 1926	182 days	
	Henri Ponsot	August 1926	13 July 1933	6 years, 11 months	
	Damien de Martel	16 July 1933	22 October 1938	5 years, 98 days	
	Gabriel Puaux	22 October 1938	November 1940	2 years	
	Jean Chiappe	24 November 1940	27 November 1940	3 days	Died on flight to take office.
	Henri Dentz	6 December 1940	14 July 1941	220 days	Dentz was repatriated to Metropolitan France following the Armistice of Saint Jean d'Acre.

=== General delegates of Free France in the Levant ===
Portrait	Name	Term of office			Notes
Portrait	Name	Took office	Left office	Time in office	Notes
	Georges Catroux	24 June 1941	7 June 1943	1 year, 348 days	Catroux was also Chief of Free French Forces in Levant states.
	Jean Helleu	7 June 1943	23 November 1943	169 days	
	Yves Chataigneau	23 November 1943	23 January 1944	61 days	
	Paul Beynet	23 January 1944	1 September 1946	2 years, 221 days	

== See also ==
- Mandate for Syria and the Lebanon
