= Fayez al-Khoury =

Syrian politician

- فايز الخوري
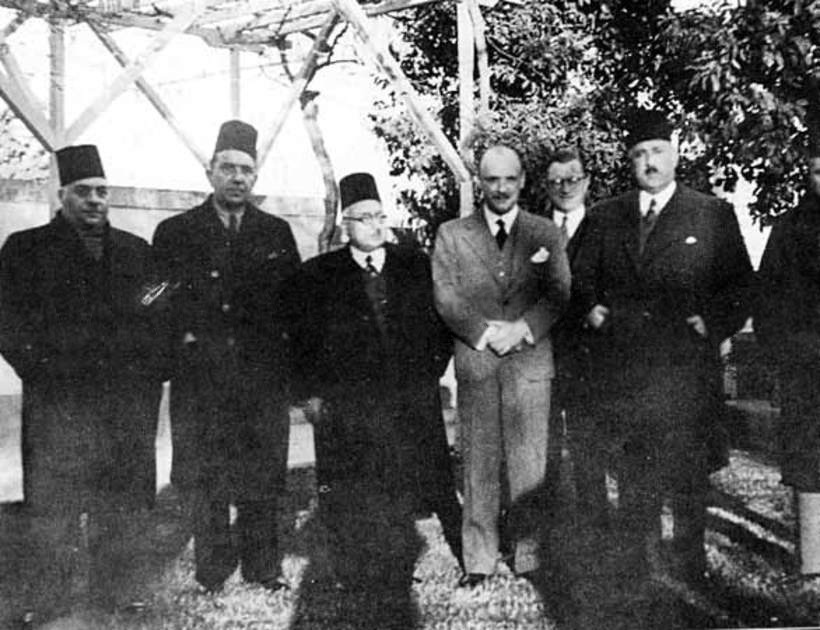
- Fayez al-Khoury, second from the left

Minister of Foreign Affairs
- In office 23 February 1939 – 5 May 1939
- President: Hashim al-Atassi
- Preceded by: Saadallah al-Jabiri
- Succeeded by: Khalid al-Azm
- In office 20 September 1941 – 25 March 1943
- President: Taj al-Din al-Hasani; Jamil al-Ulshi
- Preceded by: Khalid al-Azm
- Succeeded by: Naim Antaki

Minister of Finance
- In office 1939–1939
- Preceded by: Lutfi al-Haffar
- Succeeded by: Muhammad Khalil Mudaris
- In office 1941–1943
- Preceded by: Nin Sehnaoui
- Succeeded by: Mustafa al-Shihabi

Personal details
- Born: 1885 Kfeir, Hasbaya, Ottoman Syria (present day Lebanon)
- Died: 1959 (aged 73–74)
- Relatives: Fares al-Khoury, brother
- Education: American University of Beirut, University of Istanbul

Fayez al-Khoury (Arabic: فايز الخوري) (1959–1885), was a Syrian politician who served as foreign minister for two terms in 1930s and 40s. He also served twice as Minister of Finance.

== Background ==
He was born was born to a Greek Orthodox Christian family from the village of Kfeir, Hasbaya District in modern-day Lebanon. He came with his older brother Faris al-Khoury to Damascus and then went to study law at the American University of Beirut, and then to the Institute of Law in Istanbul.

== Career ==
He joined the National coalition in 1928 and served as foreign minister for term term in 1940s. He was also appointed the ambassador of Syria in Washington, D.C., London, and Moscow.
