= Jamil Mardam Bey =

Syrian politician (1895–1960)

- جميل مردم بك
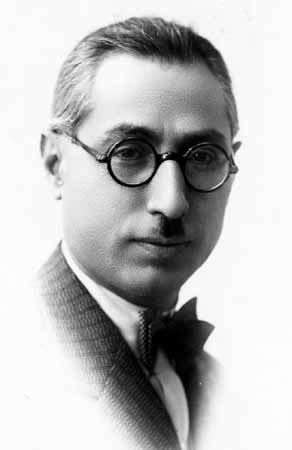

Prime Minister of Syria
- In office December 21, 1936 – February 23, 1939
- President: Hashim al-Atassi
- Preceded by: Ata Bay al-Ayyubi
- Succeeded by: Lutfi al-Haffar
- In office December 29, 1946 – December 17, 1948
- President: Shukri al-Quwatli
- Preceded by: Khalid al-Azm
- Succeeded by: Khalid al-Azm

Minister of Finance
- In office June 1932 – May 1933
- Preceded by: Tawfiq Shamia
- Succeeded by: Shakir Al-Shabani

Minister of Defence
- In office 5 April 1945 – 26 August 1945
- Preceded by: Nasuhi al-Bukhari
- Succeeded by: Khalid al-Azm
- In office 23 August 1948 – 12 December 1948
- Preceded by: Ahmad al-Sharabati
- Succeeded by: Khalid al-Azm

Minister of Foreign Affairs
- In office 19 August 1943 – 24 August 1945
- Preceded by: Naim Antaki
- Succeeded by: Mikhail Ilyan
- In office 1947–1948
- Preceded by: Naim Antaki
- Succeeded by: Muhsin al-Barazi

Personal details
- Born: 1895 Damascus, Ottoman Syria
- Died: March 30, 1960 (aged 64–65) Cairo, United Arab Republic
- Party: National Bloc
- Spouse: Safwat Sami Pasha Mardam Bey

Jamil Mardam Bey (Ottoman Turkish: جميل مردم بك; Turkish: Cemil Mardam Bey; 1895–1960), was a Syrian politician. He was born in Damascus to a prominent aristocratic family of Turkish origins. He is a descendant of the Ottoman general, statesman and Grand Vizier Lala Mustafa Pasha and the penultimate Mamluk ruler Qansuh al Ghuri. He studied at the school of Political Science in Paris and it was there that his political career started.

== Early political life ==
Al-Fatat was a secret society founded in response to the nationalist agenda of the Young Turks Revolution in 1908, that gave priority to Turks above other citizens of the Ottoman Empire. Jamil Mardam Bey along with a small group of other students in Paris joined al-Fatat in 1911. The society called on Arab and Turkish citizens to remain united within the Ottoman framework, but claimed that Arabs should have rights and obligations equal to their Turkish counterparts.

Mardam Bey helped organise the Arab Congress of 1913 in Paris, bringing together reformist groups keen to work towards decentralisation and reform in the Ottoman territories. Not wishing to create a permanent break up with authorities in Constantinople, the founders did not initially call for complete Arab liberation, but tried to sort out relations with the Ottomans. The Committee of Union and Progress (CUP) led Ottoman government sent a representative to Paris to negotiate with the congress organisers.

The outbreak of WW1 dramatically changed the dynamics in the Middle East. Compromises agreed to by the Ottomans were ignored and the CUP appointed governor general of Syria, Camel Pasha made it his mission to clamp down on Arabists and maintain order in Syria The public hanging in Beirut and Damascus on 21 August 1915 and May 6, 1916, of 32 people who had affiliations with Arabist organisations, ended any hope al-Fatat and other reformist organisations may have had to remain within the Ottoman framework. Henceforth the society dedicated its efforts to liberation from Ottoman domination.

By May 1916 the British and the French had already made a secret agreement, Sykes-Picot, carving out for themselves their spheres of influence after the anticipated demise of the Ottoman Empire and the subsequent loss of territories. In spite of having ratified the agreement, the British continued to encourage Arabs to revolt against the Ottoman Empire and in exchange, promised them independence at the end of the war. The Sykes-Picot agreement was made public by Trotsky, commissar of foreign affairs, in Izvestia newspaper on 24 November 1917. This, along with the Balfour Declaration of 9 November 1917, was the greatest indicator of what was to come and yet the British and French made a joint declaration on November 11, 1918, confirming the liberation of the peoples who had been oppressed by the Turks. The relationship both Britain and France had with the Arab territories was invariably at the expense of the citizens of these lands. It was within this framework that Mardam Bey and other Arab nationalists were to operate for the coming decades.

== Political life in Syria ==
=== Anti-French activity in Syria ===
When the Ottoman Empire was defeated in 1918, Britain was the predominant military force in the Levant. Backed by the British, Prince Faisal entered Damascus on October 3 and was made head of an Arab military administration which comprised the interior of Syria from Aqaba to Aleppo. In February 1919 Prince Faisal went to the Paris Peace Conference in order to push for the independence of Syria. By this time the British had made it clear that he was on his own negotiating with the French. Mardam Bey was one of the delegates who was invited to speak at the Paris Peace Conference. His speech made an impression on Prince Faisal, who asked him join his delegation.

Mardam Bey was one of the participants of the Syrian National Congress held in Damascus in May 1919. The purpose of the congress was to consider the future of Syria, which at the time included Lebanon, Jordan and Palestine. The concluding report that was communicated to the King–Crane Commission in June 1919, pleaded “there be no separation of the southern part of Syria, known as Palestine, nor of the littoral western zone, which includes Lebanon, from the Syrian country." The King-Crane Commission recommended "the unity of Syria be preserved." however the commission was an exercise in futility given the agreements already reached by Britain and France to carve up the lands of the Levant between them.

In Syria, nationalist fever was running high and there was resistance to the agreement Prince Faisal made with Clemenceau in January 1920, that recognised France's exclusive position in Syria. In March 1920 the Syrian Congress declared Syria to be an independent constitutional monarchy with Faisal as king. . Mardam Bey was appointed deputy foreign minister by royal decree. The San Remo conference in April of that year publicly spelled out the future of the region, and the decimation of lands that for centuries were referred to as Bilad al Sham. The French wasted no time in enforcing their mandate and brought an abrupt end to the monarchy and government when their troops entered Syria on July 24^{th.}. Faisal had already submitted his resignation as French troops marched into the country but a small group of fighters led by General Youssef al Azma fought against the French in a four-hour battle at Maysalun. Al Azma was killed in combat and became a legendary hero who is still commemorated in Syria for his heroic stance in the face of overwhelming force.

The French entry into Syria led to Jamil Mardam Bey and other nationalist leaders fleeing the country to avoid the death sentences issued by the French. Mardam Bey returned to Syria after an amnesty was issued in December 1921. Martial law denied Syrians the right of organized political association so along with other nationalists, Mardam Bey became a member of the Iron Hand Society, an underground movement initiated by Abdelrahman Shahbandar. Their activities were focused on discrediting the puppet regime set up by the French, as well as re-establishing contacts with merchants, neighbourhood bosses and students.

On April 5, 1922, Charles Crane (of the King–Crane Commission) came to Damascus and stayed as a guest of Shahbandar for two days, during which time he had meetings with a number of notables, intellectuals, religious leaders, merchants etc. all of whom voiced their dissatisfaction with the French presence in Syria. Although this time he was not in Syria in any official capacity, when Crane left Damascus two days later, the French arrested Shahbandar and four other members of the society. Their arrest led to widespread demonstrations and protests and the city almost came to a standstill for three weeks. The French persisted in their clampdown and in May had tracked down the secret offices of the Iron Hand Movement where, among others, they arrested Jamil Mardam Bey Mandated authorities handed out long prison sentences to some and exiled others. Shahbandear served 17 months of a 20-year prison sentence before being exiled and Mardam Bey spent his time in exile in Europe. They returned to Syria after the French issued amnesties in the summer of 1924

The new French High Commissioner, Maurice Sarail took up his post in January 1925. He allowed some opening of political space that led to the formation of political parties set to run for election in October of that year. Jamil Mardam Bey joined other nationalists to form the People's Party, the first modern party in French Mandate Syria. The People's Party did not charge membership dues so it relied on contributions from its wealthier members such as the landowners and the merchants as well as professional associations such as the Lawyers's Union. Funds also came from the Syrian- Palestine Congress in Cairo and Syrian emigrants in the Americas. The party leadership was composed of 12 men: Shahbandar (President), Fares el Khouri, Lutfi al-Haffar, Abd el Majid Tabbakh, Abul Khayr al Mawqi, Fawzi al Ghazzi, Ihhsan al- Sharif, Said Haydar, Jamil Mardam Bey, Tawfik Shamiyya and Adib a- Safadi and Hassan al-Hakim.. They were well regarded by the public as being dedicated nationalists ready to pay a price for their political beliefs and membership rapidly grew to over a thousand by the time of the official launch in June 1925.

==== The Syrian revolt ====
In July 1925, the chieftain, Sultan al-Atrash, launched an armed uprising against the French that started in Jabal Druze in southeast Syria. By August, the People's Party had decided to join forces with the Druze rebels and pushed for a march on Damascus. The French intercepted the rebels a few miles outside of Damascus and ordered the arrest of all nationalists. Jamil Mardam Bey went with Shabandar and a few other nationalist leaders to take refuge in Jabal Druze Sultan Atrash and the People's Party set up a provisional government on September 9 in Jabal Druze. By October 1925, large parts of Syria were in full revolt.

By 1927, the revolt had been brutally crushed by the French Army and its leaders had already been sentenced to death in absentia. Shahbandar and Mardam Bey had fled to Haifa while Sultan Atrash had been in Jordan for quite a while running rebel operations from Al Azraq . In Haifa, the British arrested and extradited Mardam Bay while allowing Shahbandar to seek refuge in Egypt. After spending a few days in a Beirut prison, Mardam Bey was exiled to the Island of Arwad off the coast of Latakia, where he spent a year before being released under a general amnesty.

The French were infuriated that the British allowed the Druze chieftain to conduct operations out of Jordan and it added to their suspicions that the British supported the revolt. The two year uprising left at least 6000 Syrians dead and a 100,000 displaced in addition to the destruction of numerous villages and cities, including parts of the capital, bombarded by the French. The French too suffered a lot of casualties with the death of at least 2,000 soldiers. In order to maintain control of Syria, the French troop numbers swelled from 15,000 in 1926 to nearly 50,000 men in 1927.

=== National Bloc politician ===
Mardam Bey then returned to Damascus and helped co-found the National Bloc in October 1927, the leading anti-French movement in Syria. The National Bloc was a loose coalition of nationalists whose goal was to reach independence through diplomacy and ‘honorable cooperation’. Syrians had paid a high price for the revolt which had resulted in much destruction and in France strengthening its stranglehold on the country. There was broad support across the country for the approach adopted by the National Bloc leaders and they dominated political life until the country attained independence . Hashim Al-Atassi, a former prime minister under Faisal, became its president and Mardam Bey was a permanent member of its executive council. Mardam Bey nominated himself on a Bloc ticket for parliament in 1928, 1932, 1936, and 1943, winning in every round.

France's reputation had suffered on the international stage following its brutal suppression of the revolt in Syria, Her role as a mandatory power was well defined by the League of Nations and she had demonstrably failed to uphold the terms of the mandate or the spirit of article 22 of the Covenant of the League of Nations that defined the role of the mandatory as more of an adviser than an overlord. The French government recognised the need to shift the approach in Syria to a more reasoned and balanced position. For the time being the French were willing to adopt a more conciliatory approach and granted Syria a constitutional regime. In 1928 Mardan Bey along with other nationalists was elected a member of a constituent assembly charged with drafting the constitution. The French disapproved of the provisions and reacted by suspending the constitution and dismissing the assembly.

In 1932 the French made another move towards elections and indicated they were prepared to negotiate a treaty to end the mandate. Mardam Bey was one of few National Bloc candidates to win a seat in parliament, where it fell to him to lead the opposition. He was appointed minister of finance but a year later submitted his resignation when it became clear the French had no intention of ending the mandate. The French attempt to impose an unsatisfactory treaty on the Syrian parliament in November 1933 ended in failure when the 17 National Bloc deputies, led by Mardam Bey managed to swing a majority against signing the treaty. The French delegate in Damascus, M Veber was in the chamber and he refused to accept the legality of the vote, opting instead to prorogue parliament for four months.

In 1934 Mardam Bey devoted his time to building up alliances and promoting Syria's cause abroad. He travelled to Saudi Arabia, Egypt, France and Iraq . He joined an all Arab delegation that worked to broker a peace deal to end the Saudi Yemen war. The Ta’if treaty was signed in June of that year.

On the domestic front, National Bloc leaders were repeatedly frustrated in their attempts to broker a treaty with France and on January 27, 1936, Jamil Mardam Bey, on behalf of the National Bloc, called for a General Strike to be maintained till constitutional life was restored to Syria. The strike turned violent, claimed lives on both sides, and led to the exile of Mardam Bey and other nationalist leaders The French arrested thousands of people over the course of a month and by February 26 more than 3000 people had been imprisoned, among them many nationalists. The French once again were shown in a negative light on the domestic and international stage and they made an about turn at the beginning of March by agreeing to negotiate a treaty.

A Syrian delegation was invited to Paris for independence talks that lasted from March–September 1936. The six man team was composed of four National Bloc representatives : Hashem el Atassi (President), Jamil Mardam Bey, Saadalla al-Jabri and Fares el Khouri. The remaining two were Amir Mustafa al Shihabi and Edmond Homsi. In exchange for independence and recognition as a member of the League of Nations (to be granted within 3 years of treaty ratification) France was given economic, and military privileges in Syria . The delegation returned to Syria in triumph and following a general election in November of that year, the National Bloc won a landslide victory. Atassi was elected president of the republic and he asked Jamil Mardam Bey to form a government. On December 27, the Syrian parliament ratified the treaty and it remained for the French to do the same.

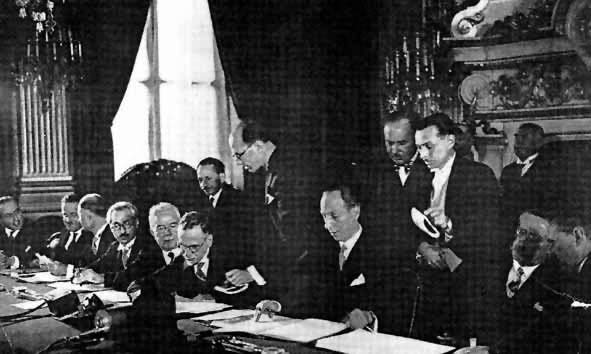
The National Bloc signing the Franco-Syrian Treaty with Blum in Paris in 1936. From left to right, a French statesman, Mustapha al-Shihabi, Saadallah al-Jabiri, Jamil Mardam Bey, Hashim al-Atassi signing, and Léon Blum.

The Atassi-Mardam Bey alliance was fraught with problems from the outset. While there was an agreed promise of independence, the French were in no hurry to ratify the treaty and they placed all kinds of obstacles in the path of the National Bloc government. Among other things, they faced French backed separatist movements in Jabal Druze, the Latakia governorate and the Gezira. The Palestinian Revolt that had started in 1936 was another challenge for the government at a time when their own situation was still precarious. The Syrian economy was riddled with problems that included high unemployment, poor harvests and soaring inflation.

Turkish claims on Alexandretta led Mardam Bey and al- Jabri (Minister of Foreign Affairs) to go to Paris on February 1, 1937. The objective of the mission was to discuss Alexandretta, speed up ratification of the treaty and to obtain full amnesty for Syrians condemned in the past by French court martial. 17. Of the three goals, only the last was achieved with full amnesty granted in May 1937. Alexandretta was ceded to Turkey in 1938 and by 1939 there was no ratification of the treaty. Mardam Bey and the National Bloc went from triumph to defeat in less than two years.

The final straw for Mardam Bey came when the French High Commission modified the decree regulating religious communities. Public opinion was outraged by the French action and Mardam Bey instructed the courts to ignore the decree. In a stand off with the French High Commission, Mardam Bey tendered his resignation on February 23, 1939. Following his resignation, the National Bloc failed to retain control of government and resigned a month later.

Dr Shahbandar had returned to Syria once he and other revolt leaders were amnestied in May 1937. Rather than rally around his former allies of the National Bloc, he became a fierce opponent, leading the charge against them and in particular against Mardam Bey. His ten years in exile had increased his bitterness and he came back determined to reclaim the political limelight. His opposition group fell apart with the resignation of Mardam Bey and other National Bloc politicians. because he had failed to formulate a uniting policy other than the ouster of the National Bloc. His attempts to court the French to negotiate a new treaty were rebuffed because his activities had long been viewed by the French as a front for the British.

==== Nationalists during the Second World War ====
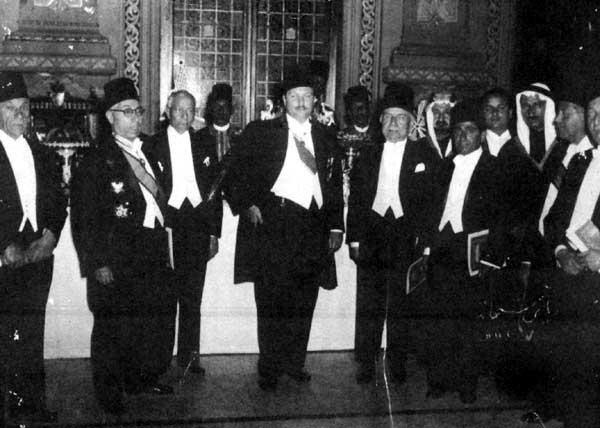
A banquet held by King Farouk of Egypt at Abdeen Palace in Cairo in 1945.

Following the German and Italian defeat of France and the signing of an armistice on June 22, 1940, the Syrians now found themselves in the ironic position of being ruled by defeated rulers. De Gaulle's call to defy the armistice and use the resources of the empire to ‘avenge the honour ‘of France added an additional layer of complexity. In spite of French neutrality towards Britain, the latter was fearful that the Germans would use French naval capabilities and on July 3, 1940, Churchill gave the order for these to be disabled. The destruction of French war ships in Mers el Kebir off the coast of Algeria led to the death of thousands of French men and the end of diplomatic relations between Britain and Vichy France on July 5. The British were now firmly in De Gaulle's camp and Syria was still under Vichy rule.

Abdulrahman Shahbandar, long identified by the French as Britain's man in Syria, was assassinated in Damascus on July 6, 1940. Shahbandar had gone to great lengths to secure British support for a plan of a loose confederation of Syria, Transjordan, Lebanon and Palestine under the Kingship of Amir Abdullah. He was at odds with many Syrian politicians, even those who had been his allies in earlier days. In August the French High Commissioner, Puaux informed his government that the assassins had been arrested and yet speculation was rife as to the motivation of the killing.

In October of that year, Shahbandar's family brought a civil case against Jamil Mardam Bey, Saadallah al-Jabri and Lutfi al-Haffar. All three men were alerted of their imminent arrest and they left Damascus for Baghdad. The trial of the accused persons began in December 1940. In the course of it the leader of the assassins, Assassa, made a complete confession : their motive in deciding to kill Dr. Shahbandar had been religious, since they regarded him as one of those responsible for the decay of Islam. The trial ended at the beginning of January, with the condemnation of six persons to death and several others to imprisonment, and the complete exoneration of Jamil Mardam Bey, Lutfi al-Haffar and Saadullah al-Jabiri. The sentences were carried out immediately.

On 8 June 1941 the British and Free French invaded Syria and Lebanon because they feared the Germans would soon be using their airfields. In order to gain the good will of the Syrians and Lebanese, General Catroux's proclamation announced the end of the Mandate and recognition of Syria's independence. The British proclamation echoed that of the French. These were viewed with cynicism by Syrians, given there was no return to constitutional life, in addition to a heavy troop presence in Syria that would not be withdrawn until the end of the war.

== Syrian independence ==
It was in 1943 that the French agreed to restore constitutional life in Syria and Lebanon. Mardam Bey allied himself with the National Bloc leader, Shukri al-Quwatli, and they ran on a joint list for parliament. The National Bloc once again dominated the political scene in the country and Al-Quwatli was elected president in August 1943. Mardam Bey was appointed minister of foreign affairs and in November 1944 he also became minister of economy and defense, as well as deputy to Prime Minister Fares Al-Khoury. Mardam Bey held all four positions until August 1945.

Lebanon was the first to test French proclamations of independence and on November 8, 1943, the Lebanese parliament voted unanimously to amend the constitution by removing all articles that made mention of the mandatory power. French reaction was swift and on 11 November the Lebanese president and the majority of ministers were arrested, the constitutional changes were annulled and parliament was dissolved. Internal and external reaction to the French action, particularly from Britain, led to the French releasing the prisoners and restoring parliament on 21 November. Mardam Bey's government followed the Lebanese example and by January 1944, the French had transferred the majority of administrative powers to Lebanon and Syria.

The final stumbling block was the transfer of the internal security forces and the local troops (Troupes Spéciales) to the Syrian government. The French employed the same delaying tactics they had used in the past and pushed for a treaty to be signed before the handover. The British supported the French by pressuring the Syrians to negotiate a treaty. Mardam Bey's government refused because they felt the time was right to push for unconditional independence. In order to strengthen their hand, Mardam Bey's government had already acquired unconditional recognition of Syrian independence from the United States and the Soviet Union. To press their advantage, Mardam Bey communicated to both countries that the British were pressuring the Syrians to enter treaty negotiations with the French. Syrian leaders relations with other Arab countries had been strengthened over the years and the Saudi, Iraqi and Egyptian governments watched closely as events unfolded in Syria. Britain was wary of being associated so openly with French policy in Syria because it did not want to antagonize the Arab countries where it had interests . At the same time Britain was not keen on France leaving the Middle East because it feared the same would be expected of them. For their part the French had long suspected the British of wanting to take their place in Syria.

The Syrians stood firm in their position that there would be no treaty with France and demanded the handover of the troops with no strings attached. The French resorted to force to impose their will on the country. On May 29, 1945, Senegalese troops under French command shelled and raided the parliament building looking for members of government they had been ordered to arrest. They entered the president's office and confiscated all his papers and took away his safe. Mardam Bey and al- Jabri were hunted down by the French troops and when they did not find them in parliament, they shelled the Orient Hotel where al-Jabri stayed, and killed a number of foreigners as well as two British officers. They then shelled the ministry of foreign affairs and took away the official seal used for official communiqués. At night the French bombed the city and cut off electricity and broadcast channels. The French spread rumours that the government had fled the capital but these were quickly quashed as word got out that the government ministers and Syrian president had remained in the capital. Protest at French action reverberated as the Syrian delegation in San Francisco for the opening of the United Nations and the newly formed Arab league sounded the alarm.

The British finally took action on 1 June when General Paget arrived with British troops and instructed the French troops to return to the barracks. Paget's report to London contained the following statement; ‘City had been subjected to fire and much looting by Senegalese during morning...the scene is one of much wanton destruction.' British troop presence in Syria was warmly greeted by the Syrian population, much to the consternation of the French. De Gaulle was incensed by British action and on 2 June he held a press conference in which he publicly accused Britain of intrigue in the Levant. De Gaulle also summoned the British ambassador Duff Cooper and accused Britain of insulting France and betraying the West

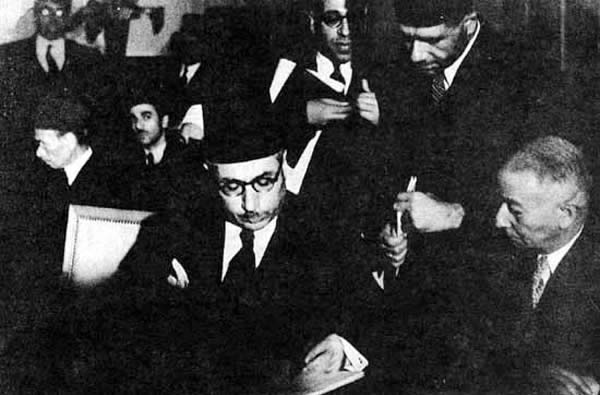
Foreign Minister Jamil Mardam Bey signing the agreements of French evacuation with French officials in April 1946

The international response to French aggression made it difficult for the French to maintain their hardline position in Syria and Lebanon and in July 1945 the much disputed Troupes Spéciales were transferred to Syrian and Lebanese control. What remained was for French and British troops to evacuate Syria. The Syrians and Lebanese leaders kept up the pressure in the international sphere and got the support of the Soviet Union in their demand for troop withdrawal. The French were wary of leaving ahead of the British for fear of them remaining and after much tension on both sides an agreement was reached in December 1945.

British and French troops evacuated from Syria on 15 April 1946 and 17 April was proclaimed Syria's National Day.

=== Post independence ===
In October 1945, at the special request of King Farouk and King Abdel Aziz, Mardam Bey was delegated to Cairo and then to Riyadh as representative of Syria. His mission lasted till October 1946, during which time he presided over the Arab League Council and was delegated as the Arab representative to Palestine 27 . In December 1946 he was recalled to the premiership. In July of the following year Syria held its first free elections as an independent nation. President al-Quwatly asked Mardam Bey to form a government.

=== Resignation ===
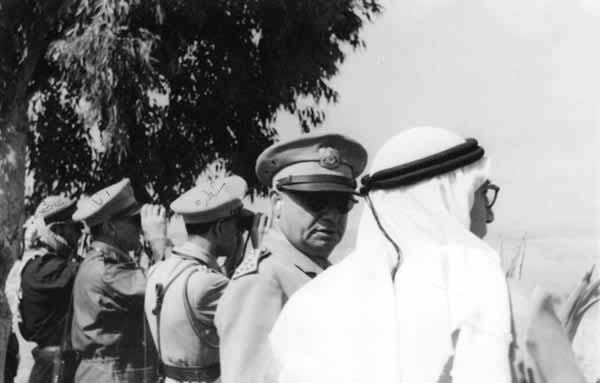
General Husni al-Za'im, the Chief of Staff, at the warfront in Palestine with Defense Minister Jamil Mardam Bey in 1948.

On May 28, 1948, defence minister, Ahmed al Sharabati, resigned three weeks into the 1948 Arab–Israeli War that started when the armies of Syria, Egypt, Jordan, Iraq, Saudi Arabia, and Lebanon invaded the former territory of the British Mandate of Palestine following the May 15 Israeli declaration of statehood. Mardam Bey became defence minister and held this position until he resigned from office in December of that year, following the defeat of the Arab armies in Palestine.

== Later life ==
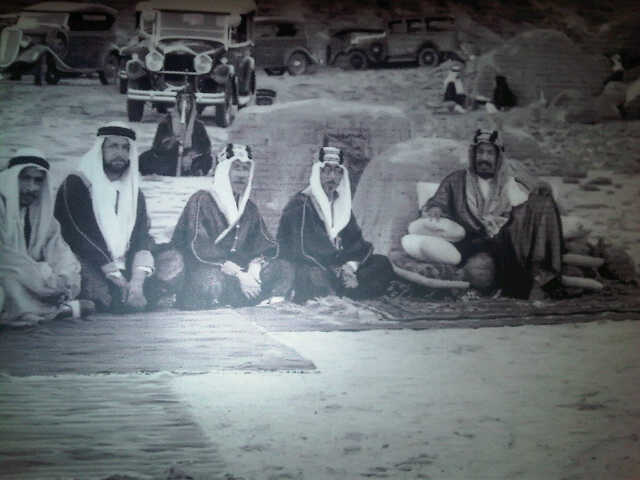
Jamil Mardam Bey, second from right with Ibn Saud, King of Saudi Arabia near Taif in 1934

Jamil Mardam Bey left Syria in January 1949 for Cairo and continued to live there until his death in 1960. Many attempts were made to lure him back to public life but his health was in decline and he felt he could not discharge his duties. In 1954, President Gamal Abdel Nasser delegated Anwar al-Sadat and diplomat Amin Shaker to persuade Mardam Bey to return to Syria and stand for presidential elections. Mardam Bey counselled the return of Shukri al-Quwatli, who had been ousted by a military coup. Mardam Bey issued a declaration in 1954 that he had officially retired from public life. He had already suffered his first heart attack.

In 1958 Mardam Bey donated the Mardam Bey family home madahah (reception hall) to the national Museum of Damascus. The room had survived the great fire of the Sulaymaniyyah quarter of old Damascus in the 1920s and is an exquisite example of Damascene artistry.

Mardam Bey died in Cairo on 30 March 1960 and was buried in Damascus.

== Personal life ==
Jamil Mardam Bey was married to Safwat Sami Pasha Mardam Bey and they had two children; Zuhair Mardam Bey and Salma Mardam Bey. Salma Mardam Bey published part of his memoirs in French, English, and Arabic.

His cousin Khalil Mardam Bey was a poet and the composer of the Syrian national anthem.

Preceded by Ata Bay al-Ayyubi	Prime Minister of Syria; 1936–1939	Succeeded by Lutfi al-Haffar
Preceded by Khalid al-Azm	Prime Minister of Syria; 1946–1948	Succeeded by Khalid al-Azm
