= 1955 Syrian presidential election =

- 28 August 1955
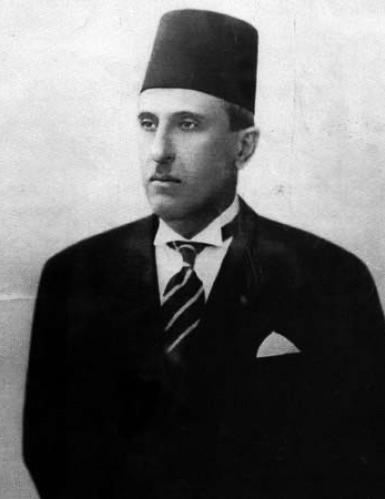

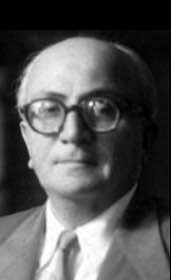
Candidate	Shukri al-Quwatli	Khalid al-Azm
Party	National Party	Independent
Electoral vote	89 (1st round); 91 (2nd round)	42 (1st round); 41 (2nd round)
Percentage	64% (1st round); 65.5% (2nd round)	30.2% (1st round); 29.5% (2nd round)
President before election
Hashim al-Atassi
People's
Elected President
Shukri al-Quwatli
National Party

The 1955 Syrian presidential election was held on 28 August 1955, when the Syrian Chamber of Deputies elected Shukri al-Quwatli as President of the Syrian Republic by 91 votes to 41 in the second round. The election is widely regarded as one of the most notable in modern Syrian history, being the first presidential election following the fall of Adib al-Shishakli's regime, and the only one in which two candidates of comparable political stature — a former president and a former prime minister — contested the office directly.

== Background ==
Following the coup against Adib al-Shishakli in February 1954, former President Hashim al-Atassi returned to office to complete his constitutional term, which was due to expire in September 1955. The Chamber of Deputies set 28 August 1955 as the date for the election of a new President of the Republic.

To ensure the election proceeded properly, Brigadier General Shawkat Shuqayr announced that the army had no candidate for the presidency.

The contest that ultimately shaped the election was between two major figures: former President Shukri al-Quwatli and former Prime Minister Khalid al-Azm. However, the competition had not initially been between these two. The first rival to al-Azm was Lutfi al-Haffar, one of the leaders of the former National Bloc and Prime Minister in 1939. When al-Quwatli announced his candidacy, al-Haffar withdrew, declaring that Syria's interests required al-Quwatli's return to power, and that he would not stand in the way of a legitimately elected president who had been removed from office unconstitutionally in the first coup of 1949.

Al-Quwatli returned from Alexandria to Damascus to begin his campaign with a series of statements calling for the rapid conclusion of the tripartite pact — a clear signal of Egyptian and Saudi support for his candidacy.

Khalid al-Azm declared his own candidacy and began a series of contacts with members of the National Party, including Sabri al-Asali and Mikhail Ilyan.

On 6 August, the National Party council met and unanimously declared its support for al-Quwatli's candidacy. Rushdi al-Kikhya announced that the People's Party would not put forward its own candidate and would leave its members free to vote as they chose.

On 10 August, Damascus merchants and industrialists held a gathering in Damascus, attended by hundreds of the country's leading figures, senior state officials, deputies from various parties and blocs, and diplomatic representatives of several Arab states. Al-Quwatli addressed the gathering, touching on several topics, notably his support for arming the military and strengthening relations with the Arab states.

On 20 August, the Constitutional Bloc declared its support for al-Quwatli, whilst the Syrian Communist Party, the Ba'ath Party, and members of the Democratic Bloc — 28 deputies in total — declared their support for al-Azm.

The Ba'ath Party had consistently criticised al-Quwatli's domestic and foreign policies. An internal party bulletin stated that the party considered the presidency a position of great consequence at this historical juncture, capable of exerting significant influence over government formation and inter-party dynamics. The bulletin noted that whilst the party was by its nature opposed to al-Quwatli's candidacy on account of what it described as the failings of his previous period in power — particularly his conduct towards the constitution — it found in al-Azm the greatest available guarantee, without formally closing the door to discussions with other groupings.

== Results ==
Canditates	Parties	1st round		2nd round	
Canditates	Parties	Votes	%	Votes	%
Shukri al-Quwatli	National Party	89	64.03	91	65.47
Khalid al-Azm	Independent	42	30.22	41	29.50
Required majority		94 votes	Two-thirds of MPs	71 votes	50% of MPs
Valid votes		131	94.24	132	94.96
Blank and invalid votes		8	5.75	7	5.04
Total		139	100	139	100
Registered voters / turnout		142	97.89	142	97.89

== Aftermath ==
Following his defeat, Khalid al-Azm submitted his resignation as a minister on Friday, 19 August. President al-Atassi refused to accept it on the grounds that it had not been submitted in accordance with constitutional conventions, but al-Azm insisted. On 24 August, Prime Minister Sabri al-Asali submitted the resignation of his government to al-Atassi, who also declined to accept it, requesting instead that the government continue in office and submit its resignation to the incoming President al-Quwatli. Sources close to the Syrian Communist Party at the time attributed the resignation to al-Quwatli's election.

== Regional and International Reception ==
The election was closely watched across the Arab world, as al-Quwatli's return to the presidency was seen as strengthening prospects for a tripartite alliance between Syria, Egypt, and Saudi Arabia.

President Gamal Abdel Nasser welcomed the election and sent a congratulatory telegram expressing the joy of the Egyptian people at the result, which he described as reflecting the Arab peoples' appreciation of al-Quwatli's record. The Egyptian newspaper Al-Ahram published an editorial entitled "The Spirit of Arabism," describing al-Quwatli as "the man of the hour" and stating that every Arab could see in his success a good omen for the Arab cause, given that the unity he sought was grounded in co-ordination with Egypt.

King Saud sent a congratulatory telegram declaring: "We congratulate Your Excellency on this victory, and we congratulate our sister Syria on the maturity of national consciousness within her, and on her appreciation of the loyal free men who built the edifice of her freedom through their dedication and sincerity."

Mustafa Ben Halim, Prime Minister of Libya, also sent a congratulatory telegram expressing his wishes for the success of Syria and the wider Arab world under al-Quwatli's leadership.
