= Naim Antaki =

Syrian politician

- نعيم أنطاكي

Minister of Foreign Affairs
- In office March 25, 1943 – August 17, 1943
- President: Ata Bey al-Ayyubi
- Preceded by: Fayez al-Khoury
- Succeeded by: Jamil Mardam Bey
- In office December 27, 1946 – November 6, 1947
- President: Shukri al-Quwatli
- Preceded by: Saadallah al-Jabiri
- Succeeded by: Jamil Mardam Bey

Minister of Finance
- In office 1945–1945
- President: Shukri al-Quwatli
- Preceded by: Khalid al-Azm
- Succeeded by: Khalid al-Azm
- In office 1945–1946
- President: Shukri al-Quwatli
- Preceded by: Khalid al-Azm
- Succeeded by: Edmond Al-Homsi

Personal details
- Born: 1903 Aleppo
- Died: 1971 (aged 67–68) Beirut

Naim Antaki (Arabic: نعيم أنطاكي) (1971–1903), was a Syrian politician who served as foreign minister and finance minister of Syria in 1940s.

== Background ==
He was born in Aleppo in 1903 to a wealthy family. he studied law at American University of Beirut and University of Paris.

== Career ==
He joined the National coalition in 1932 and served as minister of foreign affairs twice and minister of finance once in 1940s.
