= Lutfi al-Haffar =

Syrian businessman and politician

Lutfi al-Haffar لطفي الحفار
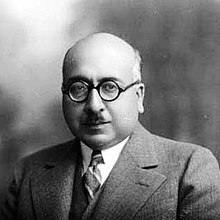

Prime Minister of Syria
- In office 23 February 1939 – 5 April 1939
- President: Hashim al-Atassi
- Preceded by: Jamil Mardam Bey
- Succeeded by: Nasuhi al-Bukhari

Personal details
- Born: 18 February 1885 Damascus, Ottoman Syria
- Died: 4 February 1968 (aged 82) Damascus, Ba'athist Syria

Lutfi al-Haffar (Arabic: لطفي الحفار) (18 February 1885 – 4 February 1968) was a Syrian businessman and politician. He was a founding member of the National Bloc and served as Prime Minister of Syria in 1939.

== Early career ==
Al-Haffar was born into the wealthy merchant Damascene family of al-Haffar. His early career was mostly devoted to his family's business in trade. He joined the Damascus Chamber of Commerce in 1922, and became its deputy president in 1924. In 1923 in response to the water shortages in Damascus, al-Haffar established the Ayn al-Fijeh Waterworks Company, which pumped water from the Ayn al-Fijeh spring in the Ghouta area to the city of Damascus and constructed the first modern public water system in the city. The project was an immediate success, and allowed the water from the Barada river to be used for other purposes like irrigation.

== Political career ==
=== French mandate ===
Al-Haffar's involvement in politics came through his alliance with nationalist leader Abd al-Rahman Shahbandar. Shahbandar and Haffar founded the People's Party, which was the first political party in Syria under the French Mandate. The party advocated the unity of the region of Syria, and the abolition of the French Mandate. The party was banned shortly thereafter by French authorities because of suspected links to the 1925 uprising in Jabal al-Druze. After the French bombardment of Damascus following the revolt, al-Haffar spearheaded a call to end armed resistance to the French in favor of political struggle.

Al-Haffar joined Ahmad Nami's cabinet as minister of public works and economy in April 1926, but resigned two months later in protest of French interference. He was arrested by the mandate authorities and detained until 1928.

==== National Bloc ====
In 1928, al-Haffar, along with a number of nationalist leaders, founded the National Bloc in Beirut. The Bloc, under the leadership of Hashim al-Atassi, became the central umbrella group for political resistance against the French occupation. Al-Haffar was elected to the national constitutional assembly in 1928, which was tasked with drafting Syria's first republican constitution.

Al-Haffar was an active participant and organizer in the 1936 Syrian general strike. The strike lasted sixty-days, and al-Haffar was arrested during a demonstration against the French-appointed prime minister, Taj al-Din al-Hasani. To end the protests, France invited the Bloc to Paris for negotiations which eventually resulted in the Franco-Syrian Treaty of Independence. In July, parliamentary elections were held and the National Bloc was elected with an overwhelming majority. Al-Atassi was elected president, and Jamil Mardam Bey prime minister. Al-Haffar served as Minister of Finance in Mardam Bey's cabinet until July 1938.

On 24 February 1939, al-Haffar was appointed prime minister by President al-Atassi. The cabinet, in which he also headed the education portfolio, lasted less than two months and was faced with a growing opposition under the leadership of al-Haffar's former ally, al-Shahbandar.

In 1940, al-Shahbandar was assassinated and al-Haffar, along with three other leaders in the National Bloc, was tried before a French military tribunal. Al-Haffar escaped to Baghdad, and remained there until he was acquitted by the courts. During the presidency of Shukri al-Quwatli between 1943 and 1946, al-Haffar served as minister of interior in three different cabinets under Prime Ministers Saadallah al-Jabiri and Faris al-Khoury.

=== Independence ===
In 1947, the National Bloc split into two competing parties, the National Party and the People's Party. Al-Haffar joined the National Party and became its secretary-general. He served as deputy to Prime Minister Mardam Bey until the military coup of Chief of Staff Husni al-Za'im overthrew the Quwatli administration. Al-Haffar was arrested along with most of Quwatli's allies. He was released after direct interference by former Lebanese Prime Minister Abdul Hamid Karami.

== Later years ==
Lutfi al-Haffar's role in Syrian politics diminished in later years, and he held no official posts in the 1950s. He opposed the 1958 union between Egypt and Syria and signed the secession declaration supporting the military coup which ended the union in 1961. He retired from politics after the March 1963 Baath-led coup d'état.

His daughter, Salma Kuzbari, became a Syrian writer and activist who catalogued her father's life and work in the 1995 book Lutfi al-Haffar: 1885-1968.

Preceded by Jamil Mardam Bey	Prime Minister of Syria; 24 February 1939 – 5 April 1939	Succeeded by Nasuhi al-Bukhari
