= Mustafa al-Shihabi =

Syrian agronomist, politician and writer

- مصطفى الشهابي
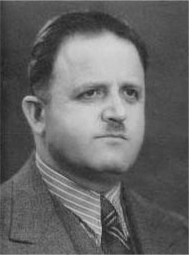
- Mustafa al-Shihabi

President of the Arab Academy of Damascus
- Incumbent
- Assumed office 1959
- Preceded by: Khalil Mardam Bey
- Succeeded by: Husni Sabah

Minister of Agriculture of Syria
- In office 1943–1944

Personal details
- Born: 1893 Hasbaya, Ottoman Empire (modern-day Lebanon)
- Died: May 13, 1968 (aged 75) Damascus, Syria
- Party: Independent
- Education: Grignon National School of Agriculture, France
- Profession: Agronomist, lexicographer, civil servant
- Known for: Authoring foundational Arabic agricultural dictionaries; serving as President of the Arab Academy of Damascus; pioneering agricultural terminology in Arabic

Prince Mustafa Al-Shihabi (Arabic: الأمير مصطفى الشهابي; 1893 – 1968) was a Syrian agronomist, politician, writer and the third elected director of Arab Academy of Damascus (1959–1968).

== Biography ==
Al-Shihabi was born in 1893 in Hasbaya in Ottoman Syria, in what is today Lebanon. After getting his degree in agriculture from Paris, France in 1915, he initially resided in Istanbul while working for the Ministry of Agriculture of the Ottoman Government. During World War I, al-Shihabi joined the Arab Revolt in an attempt to free the Levant region from Ottoman Turkish control. In 1928, while serving as the director of the Syrian Ministry of Agriculture and Agrarian Reform, al-Shihabi joined the National Bloc in opposition to the French Mandate for Syria and the Lebanon. He later served as the head of the Syrian Ministry of Education under Prime Minister of Syria Ata al-Ayyubi as well. In 1936, President of Syria Hashim al-Atassi appointed al-Shihabi as the governor of Aleppo, a post al-Shihabi was to hold until 1939.

In January 1943, al-Shihabi was appointed as the head of the Syrian Ministry of Finance by Prime Minister Jamil al-Ulshi, though he stepped down that March due to what he perceived as al-Ulshi's pro-French views. When al-Ayyubi took the position of Prime Minister for a second term, al-Shihabi retook his position in the Ministry of Finance. He was appointed as the governor of Latakia by President Shukri al-Quwatli, and was instrumental in the defeat of Sulayman al-Murshid's Alawite uprising. Al-Shihabi was promoted to the rank of secretary-general of the Syrian Council of Ministers in addition to second terms as the governor of both Aleppo and Latakia. Unlike other Quwalti-era officials, al-Shihabi remained in favor with Husni al-Za'im after the latter's CIA-supported coup d'état. After the subsequent coup of Adib Shishakli, al-Shihabi was designated as Syria's ambassador to Egypt.

He died in 1968 in Damascus and was buried there.

== Legacy ==
He exerted strong efforts for Arabization and modernizing the Arabic language by writing many comprehensive modern term indices of science and technology in Arabic. He also has many writings regarding Arab nationalism and the struggle against colonialism.

Al-Shihabi was a critic of Turkification under the Ottoman Empire, viewing the 1908 Ottoman constitution as a blow to the status of Arabic.
