= Colette Khoury =

Syrian novelist and poet (1931–2026)

- كوليت خوري
- Colette Khoury with her grandfather, Fares al-Khoury, in 1951
- Born: 1931; Bab Tuma, Damascus, Syria
- Died: 10 April 2026 (aged 95)
- Education: B.A. in French Literature
- Alma mater: Damascus University
- Occupations: Writer, academic, poet, politician
- Relatives: Fares al-Khoury, grandfather Suhail al-Khoury, father
- Writing career
- Notable work: Days With Him

Colette Khoury (Arabic: كوليت خوري, also written as Kulit Khuri, Colette al al-Khuri, Colette Khuri; 1931 — 10 April 2026) was a Syrian novelist and poet, who was the granddaughter of Fares al-Khoury who was the Prime Minister of Syria from 1944 to 1945. Khoury graduated from Damascus University with a bachelor's degree in French literature and she received a diploma from the school of literature in Beirut. Khoury's notability stems from both her work in politics and literature. Her work as a writer focused primarily on love and erotica, a subject that was previously taboo in Syrian literature.

== Life and career ==
=== Early life ===
Colette Khoury in her youth, in 1960

Colette Khoury was born into a notable family, as her grandfather, Faris al-Khoury was known as a hero for his resistance against the French. In addition, her father had been minister for village and town affairs. Khoury was also very patriotic, as she wrote several collections of stories about the 1973 October War, also known as the Yom Kippur War one of which was called "Luminous Days" (1984).

=== Writing career ===
Khoury was a pioneer of Arab feminism, and wrote angry stories in the 1950s about men and their selfishness. Khoury's career began in 1957 and spanned more than six decades. Her literary career began with the publication of a collection of poems in French entitled "Vingt Ans" (Beirut, 1958). In it Khoury expressed her discontent with social constraints and the emptiness and aimlessness of her life; she also described her attempts to find salvation in love. Much of Khoury's work stemmed from her desire to avoid blatant retaliation; writing was the best and only way she could express herself. Khoury dedicated her work to immersing herself in the female psyche, particularly defending women's right to love. Khoury once said, "Since I always felt the need to express what was welling up inside me...the need to protest, the need to scream...and since I didn't want to scream with a knife, I screamed with my fingers and became a writer." Many of Khoury's stories covered topics like love and erotica, particularly from a female's perspective. Khoury wrote more than 20 novels, as well as many political and literary articles.

In 1959, she shocked the Arab world with a novel in which she wrote openly about love; this breakthrough novel Ayyam Maahou (Days With Him) was the first time a woman had audaciously written about a subject considered taboo in conservative Syrian society. Ayyam Maahou was inspired by a love affair with the legendary Syrian poet Nizar Qabbani. Colette created a strong woman in her story whose love was not so overpowering that it blinded her or made her weak, in order to maintain the image of a strong, female leader. In the story, the protagonist and narrator, Rim, against society and her family, as she tries to develop her personal identity. While Rim's parents died when she was young and thus never could dominate her adult life, her father's domineering presence still haunts her after he has died. Rim is also disgusted by the institution of marriage in its traditional form. In the story, she says forcefully, "No! I was not born only to learn cooking and then to marry, bear children, and die! If this is the rule in my country, I will be the exception. I do not want to marry!"(22).

Two years later, she published "Layla wahida" (One night, 1961), which told a story about a night that the main character, Rasha, spent with a man who was a pilot in the French air force during World War II. This story was more controversial due to the element of adultery as an aspect of self-enlightenment. Its married heroine, Rasha, tries to find herself and regain control of her life through an extramarital relationship after being forced to prey a 30-year-old man at the age of fifteen. Her husband, Salim, approaches marriage as a business transaction, lacking emotion or compassion. Salim treats Rasha like an object and she expresses her frustration around this by saying, "Did you consider even for one day that this woman whom you had brought to supplement the furniture of your house was a human being? That she was a human being, who would a thousand times prefer your sharing of one idea of yours over your offering her the most delicious food" (39).

=== Political career ===
From 1990 to 1995, Colette Khoury served as an independent member of the Syrian parliament. In 2008, Khoury was appointed literary advisor to the Syrian President Bashar al-Assad. Towards the end of her life, she wrote for the Syrian governmental newspaper Al-Ba'ath on a broad range of political and literary issues.

=== Personal life and death ===
Khoury was twice married and divorced to the Spanish musician Rodrigo de Zayas, who was a grandson of American diplomat Francis Burton Harrison and the son of Mexican artist Marius de Zayas. Khoury and Zayas had one child, a daughter, Mercedes Nara de Zayas y Khoury. Khoury's youthful affair with Syrian poet Nizar Kabbani inspired her 1961 novel Ayyām maʻah.

Colette Khoury died on 10 April 2026 at the age of 95.

== Notable works ==
- "Ayyām maʻah" (1961)
- "Laylah wāḥidah" (1961)
- "Kiyān" (1968)
- "Dimashq baytī al-kabīr" (1970)
- "Qiṣṣatān" (1972)
- "Wa-marra ṣayf" (1975)
- "Daʼwah ilá al-Qunayṭirah" (1976)
- "al-Ayyām al-maḍīʼah : qiṣaṣ" (1984)
- "Wa-marra ṣayf : riwāyah" (1985)
- "Imraʼah : majmūʻat qiṣaṣ" (2000)
- "al-Marḥalah al-murrah : qiṣaṣ ṭawīlah" (2002)
- "Sa-talmisu aṣābiʻī al-shams : qiṣṣah ramzīyah" (2002)
- "Fī al-zawāyā-- ḥakāyā : tisʻ qiṣaṣ wa-masraḥīyah" (2003)
- "Kūlīt Khūrī : būḥ al-yāsmīn al-Dimashqī" (2008)
- "Wa-yabqá al-waṭan fawqa al-jamīʻ" (2010)

== See also ==
- Syrian literature § Syrian women writers
