= Al-Ayoubi family =

Royal and noble family

Al-Ayoubi Family عائِلَة الأَيّوبيّ
- Yellow banner with the Eagle of Saladin, believed to be the symbol of the Ayyubids

Al-Ayoubi (الأيوبي) is a powerful and prominent dynastic family based in Damascus.

The Al-Ayoubi family has seen many members who held political and financial power in Bilad Al Sham (Modern day Syria, Lebanon, Jordon, Palestine, Iraq, and some parts of Egypt, turkey, yemen, and Saudi Arabia).

The famous Sultan (Ruler) Saladin Al-Ayoubi, founded the Ayoubi Dynasty in the 12th–13th centuries that later became the Ottoman Empire, with his remnant polities surviving into the 14th–17th centuries.

The Al-Ayoubi family traces its lineage to Abu Ayoub al-Ansari, an Arab warrior and a prominent companion of the Islamic prophet Muhammad. He moved the Al-Ayoubi family from Madina to Damascus after defeating the Byzantine (Roman) Empire. The historian Ibn Asakir records Abu Ayoub's death during the siege of Constantinople in History of Damascus. His genealogical work associated the Damascene Al-Ayoubi family as his descendants.

The family's traditional ancestry is Banu Khazraj, one of the principal Arab tribes of Medina, whom Abu Ayyub al-Ansari belonged to.

In modern day, the family has played a significant role in the political, economic, and social landscape of the region, with its members holding influential positions in Iraq, Jordan, Lebanon, Saudi Arabia, and Syria. Today, most of the family resides in the major cities of Damascus, Beirut.

== Notable members ==
=== In Iraq ===
- Ali Jawdat Al-Ayoubi (1853–1969), 15th Prime Minister of Iraq. He served as prime minister for three terms (1934, 1949, 1957) under King Ghazi I, King Faisal II, and regent 'Abd al-Ilah.

=== In Jordan ===
- Saad Mohammed Juma Al-Ayoubi (1916–1979) 17th Prime Minister of Jordan and Minister of the Royal Hashemite Court.
- Muhammad Attallah Effendi Al-Ayoubi, Kaymakam of Al-Salt 1909.

=== In Saudi Arabia ===
- Dr. Muhammad Zuhair Al-Ayoubi, was a member of the national union of the new born United Arab Republic. In 1964 he left Syria to Saudi Arabia where he was a co-founder of the Riyadh Radio and TV Stations and served as its director. For his services King Faisal of Saudi Arabia granted him and his family Saudi citizenship.

=== In Syria ===
- Ata Bey al-Ayoubi (1877–1951). 7th President of Syria.
- Major General Shukri Pasha Al-Ayoubi (1851–1922) fought in WWI and was appointed governor of Damascus, Beirut and Aleppo.
- Raouf Al Ayoubi (1883–1947). A notable Freemason and a senior official in the Ottoman Empire.
- Mahmoud Al-Ayoubi (1932–2013), 57th Prime Minister of Syria.
- Ziyad al-Din al-Ayoubi, Minister of Endowments.
