= Ministry of Finance (Syria) =

Government ministry of Syria

- وزارة المالية

Agency overview
- Formed: 1918
- Jurisdiction: Government of Syria
- Headquarters: Zeky Al Arsouzy St, Damascus; 33°31′18″N 36°17′50″E
- Minister responsible: Mohammed Yisr Barnieh
- Website: syrianfinance.gov.sy

Map
- Interactive map showing the building of the Ministry of Finance

The Ministry of Finance (وزارة المالية, Wizārat al-Māliyah) is a government ministry of Syria.

== Responsibilities ==
The ministry is responsible for the preparation of the state's financial policies, the supervision of their implementation by monitoring and collecting public revenues to the state treasury, the oversight of state expenditures, and the preparation of the state budget.

Alongside this, it is also responsible for managing public debt in cooperation with the Central Bank of Syria.

== List of Ministers ==
Minister	Term
Said Choucair	1918–1920
Fares al-Khoury	1920
Hamdi al-Nasr	1920–1922
Muhammad Ali Bey al-Abid	1922–1925
Jalal Zuhdi	1925–1926
Shakir al-Shabani	1926
Abdul Qadir Al-Azm	1926
Hamdi al-Nasr	1926–1928
Jamil al-Ulshi	1928–1931
Tawfiq Shamia	1931–1932
Jamil Mardam	1932–1933
Shakir al-Shabani	1933–1934
Henri Hindieh	1934–1936
Edmond Al-Homsi	1936
Shukri al-Quwwatli	1936–1938
Lutfi al-Haffar	1938
Fayez al-Khoury	1939
Muhammad Khalil Mudaris	1939
Hosni al-Bitar	1939–1941
Jean Sehnaoui	1941
Fayez al-Khoury	1941–1943
Mustafa al-Shihabi	1943
Khalid al-Azm	1943–1945
Naim Antaki	1945
Khalid al-Azm	1945
Naim Antaki	1945–1946
Edmond Al-Homsi	1946
Said Ghazzi	1946–1947
Wehbe Hariri	1947–1948
Hassan Jabara	1948–1949
Khalid al-Azm	1949
Abdul Rahman Al-Azm	1949–1950
Hassan Jabara	1950
Shakir Alas	1950–1951
Abdul Rahman Al-Azm	1951
Hassan al-Hakim	1951
Shakir Alas	1951–1952
Saeed al-Zaeem	1952–1953
George Shahin	1953–1954
Abdul Rahman Al-Azm	1954
Izzat al-Saqal	1954
Rizqallah Antaki	1954–1955
Lyon Zomria	1955
Abd al-Wahhab Hawmad	1955–1956
Sabri al-Asali	1956
Asad Mohsen	1956–1958
Fakhir Alkiali	1958
Abd al-Wahhab Hawmad	1958–1960
Naaman W. Azhari	1961–1962
Abd al-Wahhab Hawmad	1963
Mustafa ash-Shamma	1963–1964
Abd al-Fattah Bushi	1964–1965
Muwaffaq al-Shurbaji	1965–1969
Nurallah Nurallah	1969–1974
Muhammad al-Sharif	1974–1976
Sadiq al-Ayyubi	1976–1980
Hamdi al-Saqqa	1980–1985
Qahtan al-Sioufi	1985–1987
Khalid al-Mahayni	1987–2001
Mohammad al-Atrash	2001–2003
Mohammad al-Hussein	2003–2011
Mohammad al-Jililati	2011–2014
Ismael Ismael	2014–2016
Maamoun Hamdan	2016–2020
Kenan Yaghi	2020–2024
Riad Abdul Ra'ouf	2024
Mohammed Abazaid	2024–2025
Mohammed Yisr Barnieh	2025–present

== See also ==
- Government ministries of Syria
- Central Bank of Syria
- Economy of Syria
