= Salma Kuzbari =

Syrian writer (1923–2006)

Salma al-Haffar Kuzbari (May 1, 1923 – August 11, 2006; Arabic: سلمى الحفار الكزبري) was a Syrian writer and translator. She is best known for her literary criticism and biography on the women's rights activist and writer May Ziadeh, as well as for her writing on Spain's Andalusia region, notably the book The Two Eyes of Seville.

== Early life and education ==
Salma al-Haffar Kuzbari was born into a prominent family in Damascus in 1923. Her father, Lutfi al-Haffar, briefly served as prime minister of Syria in 1939. He was supportive of her professional pursuits, and after initially attending a Muslim religious school, she studied Arabic, English, and French at a private Franciscan school, at a time when girls' education was unusual in Syria. She then studied political science by correspondence with Saint Joseph University of Beirut, but she did not complete a degree.

== Career ==
=== Writing ===
In 1940, Kuzbari published her first work in Al Ahad, a magazine based in Damascus. A decade later, she published her first book, the autobiographical Hala's Diaries, in 1950. She produced a series of short story collections in the 1950s and '60s, as well as two French-language poetry collections, Solitary Rose in 1958 and Yesterday's Scent in 1966.

From her early literary career, Kuzbari's writing addressed the inner lives of women, a rare subject for Syrian literature at the time.

She spent many years living abroad, notably in Spain, where she worked at the Syrian Embassy. There, she became keenly interested in the Spanish Golden Age in Andalusia. This experience informed both her best-received novel, The Two Eyes of Seville (1965), and her 2000 memoir Spanish and Andalusian Memories with Nizar Kabbani and his Letters, which was inspired by her friendship with the poet Nizar Qabbani. Her contributions to Syrian scholarship on Andalusia are considered significant, and for her work on the subject she was awarded a medal from the Spanish government in 1964 and the University of Palermo's Mediterranean Literature Award in 1980.

In 1970, she published a second autobiographical book, Amber and Ashes. This was followed in 1974 by the novel Bitter Oranges, which deals with young Palestinian women's lives in the throes of conflict. She also wrote a biography of the writer George Sand in 1979.

Kuzbari is also well known for her work on the pioneering Lebanese-Palestinian writer May Ziadeh. She dedicated 17 years of her career to researching Ziadeh and wrote several books on her life, including May Ziadeh and the Tragedy of Genius (1961) and Blue Flame: The Love Letters of Kahlil Gibran to May Ziadeh (1979), the latter of which was widely translated. In 1995, she was awarded the King Faisal Prize for Arabic Language and Literature for her work.

In 1994, Kuzbari published her first and only Spanish-language poetry collection, The Eve of the Voyage. Her final work, published in 1995, was a biography of her father, Lutfi al-Haffar: 1885–1968.

=== Activism ===
In addition to studying and chronicling the lives of prominent women, Kuzbari was a feminist and women's rights activist herself. At an early age she rejected the traditional black hijab, preferring instead a white headscarf. She was involved in various women's organizations and attended international human rights conferences.

This activity extended to charitable work, with Kuzbari co-founding in 1945 the children's charity Mabarat al Taleem wa al-Muwasaat (the Mabarra Association for Education and Consolation), which cared for young orphans.

== Personal life ==
In 1941, she married Mohammed Karami, the brother of the Lebanese independence leader Abdul Hamid Karami, but he was killed just a month after their first child, a son, was born.

She remarried in 1948, wedding the Syrian diplomat Nader al-Kuzbar. The couple had two daughters together and spent many years living in various countries across Latin America and Europe, where he served as ambassador to Argentina, Chile, and Spain. She died in Beirut in 2006 at age 83.

== Selected works ==
=== Nonfiction ===
- Mai Ziadeh and the Tragedy of Genius (1961)
- Outstanding Women (1961)
- Blue Flame: The Love Letters of Kahlil Gibran to May Ziadeh (1979)
- George Sand (1979)
- Lutfi al-Haffar: 1885–1968 (1995)

=== Memoir ===
- Hala's Diaries (1950)
- Amber and Ashes (1970)
- Love After Fifty (1989)
- Spanish and Andalusian Memories with Nizar Kabbani and his Letters (2000)

=== Poetry ===
- Solitary Rose (1958)
- Yesterday's Scent (1966)
- The Eve of the Voyage (1994)

=== Novels ===
- The Two Eyes of Seville (1965)
- Bitter Oranges (1974)

=== Story collections ===
- Deprivation (1952)
- Corners (1955)
- The Westerner (1966)
- The Grief of Trees (1986)
