= Edmond Al-Homsi =

Syrian politician

Minister of Finance
- In office February 23, 1936 – December 21, 1936
- President: Muhammad Ali Bey al-Abid
- Preceded by: Hinri Hindia
- Succeeded by: Shukri al-Quwwatli
- In office April 26, 1946 – December 27, 1946
- President: Shukri al-Quwatli
- Preceded by: Naim Antaki
- Succeeded by: Said Ghazzi

Personal details
- Born: 1901
- Died: 1972 (aged 70–71)
- Education: American University of Beirut, University of Oxford

Edmond Al-Homsi (1901 – 1972), was a Syrian politician who served as Minister of Finance for two terms in 1936 and 1946.

== Background ==
He studied sociology and political science at American University of Beirut and studied postgraduate degree in Banking and finance at University of Oxford.

== Career ==
He cofounded the National Bloc in 1928, and served as Minister of Finance for two terms in 1936 and 1946. He also was the ambassador of Syria in London and Brussels.
