= Franco-Syrian Treaty of Independence =

1936 agreement for independence of the First Syrian Republic from France

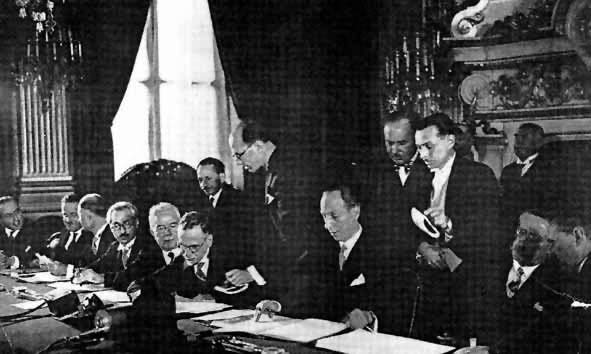
- Syrian Delegation signing the Franco-Syrian Treaty in Paris in 1936
- Signed: 9 September 1936
- Signatories: Syria; France

The Franco-Syrian Treaty of Independence, also known as the Viénot Accords, was a treaty negotiated between France and Syria to provide for Syrian independence from French authority.

== History ==
In 1934, France attempted to impose a treaty of independence that was heavily prejudiced in its favor. It promised gradual independence but kept the Syrian Mountains under French control. The Syrian head of state at the time was a French puppet, Muhammad 'Ali Bay al-'Abid. Fierce opposition to this treaty was spearheaded by a senior nationalist and parliamentarian Hashim al-Atassi, who called for a sixty-day strike in protest. Atassi's political coalition, the National Bloc, mobilized massive popular support for his call. Riots and demonstrations raged, and the economy came to a standstill.

The new Popular Front-led French government then agreed to recognize the National Bloc as the sole legitimate representative of the Syrian people and invited Hashim al-Atassi to independence negotiations in Paris. He traveled there on 22 March 1936, heading a senior Bloc delegation. The resulting treaty called for immediate recognition of Syrian independence as a sovereign republic, with full emancipation granted gradually over a 25–year period.

The treaty guaranteed incorporation of previously autonomous Druze and Alawite regions into the region of Syria, but not Lebanon, with which France signed a similar treaty in November. The treaty also promised curtailment of French intervention in Syrian domestic affairs as well as a reduction of French troops, personnel and military bases in Syria. In return, Syria pledged to support France in times of war, including the use of its air space, and to allow France to maintain two military bases on Syrian territory. Other political, economic and cultural provisions were included.

Atassi returned to Syria in triumph on 27 September 1936 and was elected President of the Republic in November.

The emerging threat of Adolf Hitler induced a fear of being outflanked by Nazi Germany if France relinquished its colonies in the Middle East. That, coupled with lingering imperialist inclinations in some levels of the French government, led France to reconsider its promises and refuse to ratify the treaty. Also, France ceded the province of Alexandretta, whose territory was guaranteed as part of Syria in the treaty, to Turkey. Riots again broke out, Atassi resigned, and Syrian independence was deferred until after World War II, when the last French troops evacuated in 1946.

== Syrian Delegation ==
Member	Notes
Hashim al-Atassi	The head of the delegation, the leader of the National Bloc
Fares al-Khoury	Representative of the National Bloc
Jamil Mardam Bey	Representative of the National Bloc
Saadallah al-Jabiri	Representative of the National Bloc
Mostafa al-Shihabi	Ministry of Education
Edmond al-Homsi	Ministry of Finances
Naim Antaki	Secretary
Edmonton Rabbat	Secretary

== See also ==
- History of Syria
- League of Nations Mandate
- Hashim al-Atassi
- French colonial flags
- French Colonial Empire
- List of French possessions and colonies
- Sykes-Picot agreement
