= Fares al-Khoury =

Syrian statesman and minister (1877–1962)

His Excellency Fares al-Khoury
- فارس الخوري
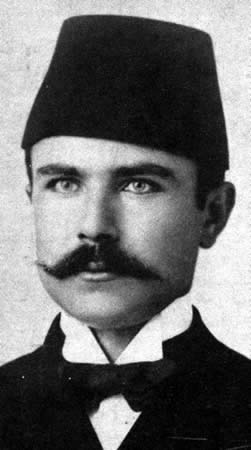

Prime Minister of Syria
- In office October 14, 1944 – October 1, 1945
- President: Shukri al-Quwatli
- Preceded by: Saadallah al-Jabiri
- Succeeded by: Saadallah al-Jabiri
- In office November 3, 1954 – February 13, 1955
- President: Hashim al-Atassi
- Preceded by: Said al-Ghazzi
- Succeeded by: Sabri al-Assali

President of the Chamber of Deputies, Speaker of the House of Representatives
- In office November 21, 1938 – July 8, 1939
- Preceded by: Hashim al-Atassi
- Succeeded by: Fares al-Khoury
- In office August 17, 1943 – October 17, 1944
- Preceded by: Fares al-Khoury
- Succeeded by: Saadallah al-Jabiri
- In office September 16, 1945 – October 22, 1946
- Preceded by: Saadallah al-Jabiri
- Succeeded by: Fares al-Khoury
- In office September 27, 1947 – March 31, 1949
- Preceded by: Fares al-Khoury
- Succeeded by: Rushdi al-Kikhya

1st Syrian Permanent Representative to the United Nations
- In office 1946–1948
- Preceded by: office established
- Succeeded by: Farid Zeineddine

Personal details
- Born: November 20, 1877 Kfeir, Hasbaya, Ottoman Syria (present day Lebanon)
- Died: January 2, 1962 (aged 84) Damascus, Syria
- Party: People's Party
- Other political affiliations: National Bloc
- Spouse: Asma'a Gabriel Eid
- Relatives: Fayez al-Khoury (brother); Suhail al-Khoury (son); Colette Khoury (granddaughter)

Fares al-Khoury (Arabic: فارس الخوري, romanized: Fāris al-Khūrī; November 20, 1877 – January 2, 1962) was a Syrian politician who served as the prime minister of Syria from October 14, 1944 to October 1, 1945 and again from November 3, 1954 until February 13, 1955, alongside having served as Minister of Finance under Ali al-Rikabi, the first Syrian Permanent Representative to the United Nations and as President of the Chamber of Deputies on four occasions, from November 21, 1938 until March 31, 1949. As of 2026, al-Khoury's premiership is the highest political position reached by a Syrian Christian in Syria. His political success was due in part to his staunch secularist and nationalist policies. As a Syrian nationalist, he opposed pan-Arabism and the union between Syria and Egypt in the United Arab Republic. al-Khoury was the grandfather of Syrian novelist Colette Khoury.

Fares al-Khoury with his granddaughter, Colette Khoury, in 1951

== Early years ==
al-Khoury was born in Kfeir in the Hasbaya District in modern-day Lebanon to a Greek Orthodox Christian family that, according to his own memoirs, had originally come from the village of Ayn Halya in Kaza Al-Zabadani. The family eventually converted to Presbyterianism. He studied at the American University of Beirut (AUB), at the time called Syrian Protestant College. He began his career as an instructor at AUB and became involved in Al-Fatat (the Young Arab Society), an underground Arab nationalist organization in the anti-Ottoman movement, after Al-Fatat's formation in Paris in 1911.

== Political career ==
al-Khoury became the Christian member of the Ottoman Parliament representing Damascus in 1914 but resigned in 1916. In May 1916, he agreed to assist Michel Sursock, a wartime businessman, in requisitioning grain from farmers in the Hawran. In the same year, al-Khoury promised to support the Arab Revolt launched from Mecca by Sharif Husayn. The connections al-Khoury had with Husayn as the prime nationalist of his era resulted in al-Khoury's arrest and trial by a military tribunal in Aley. In 1920, when Faisal I of Iraq briefly became Syria's king, al-Khoury next pledged his support to Faisal.

On September 18, 1918, al-Khoury created a preliminary government with a group of notables in Damascus, spearheaded by Prince Sa’id al-Jaza’iri. al-Khoury then became Minister of Finance in the new Syrian cabinet of Prime Minister Ali al-Rikabi. His post was renewed by Prime Minister Hashim al-Atassi in May 1920. He held this position until King Faisal was dethroned and the French Colonial forces imposed their mandate on Syria in July 1920. al-Khoury laid the groundwork for the Syrian Ministry of Finance, created its infrastructure, distributed its administrative duties, formulated its laws, and handpicked its staff. In 1923, he helped found Damascus University, and along with a group of veteran educators, translated its entire curriculum from Ottoman Turkish into Arabic.

In 1925, al-Khoury joined Abd al-Rahman Shahbandar to form the People's Party, of which he became vice-president. Minister of Education from April to July 1926, he was elected member of the Syrian Constituent Assembly in 1928, then elected to the Council of Representatives in 1932, re-elected in 1936 and served as the president of the Chamber of Deputies and again in 1943 alongside as president of the Chamber of Deputies until 1944. He was a member of the Syrian delegation that negotiated the Franco-Syrian Treaty in Paris in 1936.

He became Prime Minister from October 14, 1944, till October 1, 1945, then again president of the Chamber of Deputies until Husni al-Za'im's coup and subsequent dissolution of the Chamber of Deputies in April 1949. After elections were held in October 1954, he returned as Prime Minister from October 25, 1954, till February 13, 1955, when his pro-Western government, hostile to a union with Egypt, was toppled by the Chamber of Deputies.

=== Foundation of the United Nations ===
Fares Khoury was the first Syrian statesman to visit the United States and represent his country in 1945 at the inauguration of the United Nations (UN). Syria was one of the original 53 founding members of the UN. An opinion piece in 2007 claimed that six decades earlier an unnamed US diplomat remarked that, with men like al-Khoury, it isn't possible for a country to be occupied.

== Later years and death ==
In his old age, al-Khoury spent more time with his wife, child, and three grandchildren, Fares Jr, Colette, and Samer. He continued to travel to attend annual law conventions in Switzerland, until he fractured his leg and was forced to stay at home for the final two years of his life.

=== Death ===
On January 2, 1962, al-Khoury died in Damascus at the age of 84. He received presidential honors at his funeral as one of the founders of the Syrian Republic, unlike any prime minister before or after him. Muslim community leaders were allowed to recite the Quran during the condolence service. Suheil al-Khury accepted this rare act to show how secular his father had been, and how close he had been to both Muslims and Christians. Faris al-Khoury's death came three months after the dissolution of the United Arab Republic between Egypt and Syria (1958–1961) during which he was an active political opponent.

== Personal opinions ==
=== Status of the Hatay Province ===
As a Syrian nationalist, he considered the territorial transfer of Hatay Province to Turkey by the French government as illegal under international law. For that reason, he also opposed the proposal to declare every unprovoked invasion by armed gangs of another country as criminal under international law, claiming that such gangs often served interests of national liberation of certain territories. However, he considered the refusal of government parties to a dispute to submit to UN Security Council resolutions as an international crime.
