= Jamil al-Ulshi =

Syrian politician (1883–1951)

- جميل الألشي
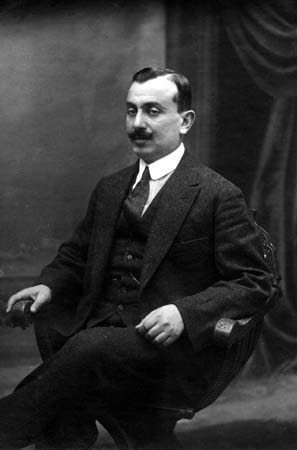

Interim President of Syria
- In office 17 January 1943 – 25 March 1943
- Preceded by: Taj al-Din al-Hasani
- Succeeded by: 'Ata Bay al-Ayyubi

Prime Minister of Syria
- In office 6 September 1920 – 30 November 1920
- Preceded by: Aladdin Al-Droubi
- Succeeded by: Subhi Bey Barakat
- In office 10 January 1943 – 25 March 1943
- Preceded by: Husni al-Barazi
- Succeeded by: Saadallah al-Jabiri

Personal details
- Born: 17 January 1883 Damascus, Syria Vilayet, Ottoman Empire
- Died: 25 March 1951 (aged 68) Damascus, Syria

Jamil al-Ulshi (17 January 1883 – 25 March 1951) (Arabic: جميل الألشي) was a Syrian politician, two-time prime minister of Syria and acting head of state (17 January – 25 March 1943) during the French Mandate era.

== Biography ==
He was born and raised in Damascus, and educated in the Ottoman Military Academy in Istanbul.

He defected from the Ottoman army and joined the Arab revolt under the leadership of Hussein bin Ali, Sharif of Mecca. After the end of World War I, he was a member of a six-man committee charged with discharging executive authority in Syria until the Kingdom of Syria was proclaimed under Faisal I, after which, in October 1918, he was appointed private chamberlain to the new monarch. However, the kingdom was dissolved by the French, who imposed their mandate on Syria in July 1920 and exiled Faisal (see Sykes-Picot Agreement and San Remo conference). Ulshi remained behind and participated in successive pro-French and French-appointed puppet governments, occupying several high posts in the cabinet, becoming acting Prime Minister on 6 September 1920. He rapidly gained a reputation for subservience to the French and nepotism, appointing several family members to high government posts. The French mandate authorities subdivided Syria into independent and semi-independent zones and annexed large areas to Lebanon, enraging Syrian nationalists, and several revolts broke out across the country.

Ulshi became increasingly unpopular when he did nothing to oppose these measures, and raised no objections to the severe French military response to the revolts. He was forced to resign on 30 November 1920. He remained a political outcast until 1928, when he was able to return to the cabinet as Minister of Finance when his longtime ally Taj al-Din al-Hasani became Prime minister; he held this post until August 1930, when he retired. He came out of retirement in September 1941 to become an advisor to Hasani when the latter assumed the presidency. Hasani asked Ulshi to form a government in January 1943. He did so, giving several posts to nationalist politicians to appease the opposition. However Hasani died that same month, and Ulshi became acting president as well as prime minister. His tenure was marred by widespread public anger and rioting at high prices and taxes imposed to aid the unpopular French war effort in Europe. He was again forced to resign, and disappeared from public life until his death eight years later.

Preceded by Taj al-Din al-Hasani	President of Syria; 17 January – 25 March 1943	Succeeded by 'Ata' Bay al-Ayyubi
