= Khalid al-Azm =

Syrian politician (1903–1965)

- خالد العظم
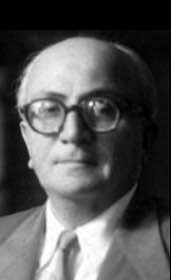

Interim President of Syria
- In office 4 April 1941 – 16 September 1941
- Preceded by: Bahij al-Khatib
- Succeeded by: Taj al-Din al-Hasani

Prime Minister of Syria
- In office 4 April 1941 – 21 September 1941
- Preceded by: Nasuhi al-Bukhari
- Succeeded by: Hassan al-Hakim
- In office 16 December 1946 – 29 December 1946
- President: Shukri al-Quwatli
- Preceded by: Saadallah al-Jabiri
- Succeeded by: Jamil Mardam Bey
- In office 16 December 1948 – 7 April 1949
- President: Shukri al-Quwatli
- Preceded by: Jamil Mardam Bey
- Succeeded by: Husni al-Za'im
- In office 27 December 1949 – 4 June 1950
- President: Hashim al-Atassi
- Preceded by: Nazim al-Kudsi
- Succeeded by: Nazim al-Kudsi
- In office 27 March 1951 – 9 August 1951
- President: Hashim al-Atassi
- Preceded by: Nazim al-Kudsi
- Succeeded by: Hassan al-Hakim
- In office 17 September 1962 – 9 March 1963
- President: Nazim al-Kudsi
- Preceded by: Bashir al-Azma
- Succeeded by: Salah al-Din Bitar

Personal details
- Born: 6 November 1903 Damascus, Syria Vilayet, Ottoman Empire
- Died: 18 February 1965 (aged 61) Beirut, Lebanon
- Party: Independent
- Spouse: Layla Al-Rifai

Khalid al-Azm (Arabic: خالد العظم, romanized: Khālid al-ʿAẓim; 6 November 1903 – 18 February 1965) was a Syrian politician who served as the acting President of Syria from 4 April to 16 September 1941 alongside as the Prime Minister of Syria on five separate occasions.

He was a member of the al-Azm family, one of the most prominent political families in Syria, and was the son of an Ottoman minister of religious affairs.

== Early life and career ==
He graduated from the University of Damascus in 1923 with a degree in law, and joined the city government in 1925. At this time he also actively ran his family's estates throughout the country. In the 1930s, he became close associates with leading members of the anti-French National Bloc coalition such as future presidents Hashim al-Atassi and Shukri al-Kuwatli. He remained a longtime supporter of the former, but often quarreled with the latter, whom he accused of being too authoritarian. In April 1941, the Vichy-controlled mandate administration appointed al-Azm Prime Minister and acting Head of State, replacing the widely unpopular French loyalist Bahij al-Khatib in an effort to conciliate nationalist opinion after strikes and demonstrations swept Damascus earlier that year. Though not a member of the National Bloc, al-Azm was acceptable to nationalist circles, and his government released political prisoners and was tasked with preparing a return to constitutional life. His tenure ended five months later, after the Allied invasion of Syria brought the Free French to power. In September 1941, Charles de Gaulle's administration installed the French loyalist Taj al-Din al-Hasani as president after having failed to persuade Hashim al-Atassi to return to office. Azm served repeatedly in parliament and in the cabinet from 1943 to 1947. He became a focus of opposition when he resigned from the cabinet in 1945 and lead the forces opposed to Kuwatli's drive to amend the constitution to allow himself a second term in office. Kuwatli prevailed, and Azm ran against him in 1947 and lost. However he accepted the position of envoy to France and served in that capacity for a year. He concluded successful arms purchases from France and later from the Soviet Union. In May 1948, Azm agreed to form a multi-party cabinet under Kuwatli which served until March 1949. He allied himself with France and the United States and attempted to obtain loans from them for domestic development. He traveled frequently to attend United Nations assemblies on the Palestinian problem.

Azm clashed with members of the military, especially Chief of Staff Husni al-Za'im. The latter launched a coup d'état on 30 March 1949 and imprisoned both Azm and president Kuwatli. Finally on 7 April, Quwatli and al-Azm resigned. When Za'im was overthrown five months later, Azm returned to parliament as deputy for Damascus and became Minister of Finance. He was also elected into the Constituent Assembly that drafted a new constitution for Syria. He became Prime Minister again under Hashim al-Atassi's second administration, in June 1950, heading three cabinets between then and 1951. Azm closed the border to Lebanese goods in an attempt to prevent the crash of domestic Syrian industry due to rampant Lebanese imports. He also clashed repeatedly with the military because he refused to appoint officers in any of his cabinets, and always reserved the defense portfolio for himself. He also clashed with pro-Hashemite elements in Syrian politics that advocated union with Iraq. Socialists distrusted him because of his aristocratic and wealthy Ottoman background. Azm left the public arena from 1951 to 1954 in protest over the coup of Adib al-Shishakli which toppled Atassi's democratic administration.

=== Opposition to Nasser ===
After the deposition of Shishakli, Azm again lost to Kuwatli in the presidential election of 1955. He retired briefly, then reemerged in November 1956 to enter the cabinet of Prime Minister Sabri al-Assali as minister of defense. Azm played a key role in achieving an alliance with the USSR, and traveled there repeatedly to arrange loans, economic pacts and arm sales, angering the United States, where he was nicknamed the "Red Millionaire". This name was even adopted by the Syria Press in the 1950s, although he was not a socialist, and opposed Egyptian president Gamal Abdel Nasser. He opposed in vain the union with Egypt in 1958 which created the United Arab Republic, arguing that Nasser would destroy Syria's democratic system and free market economy. After the formation of the United Arab Republic, Azm moved to Lebanon.

=== Military instability ===
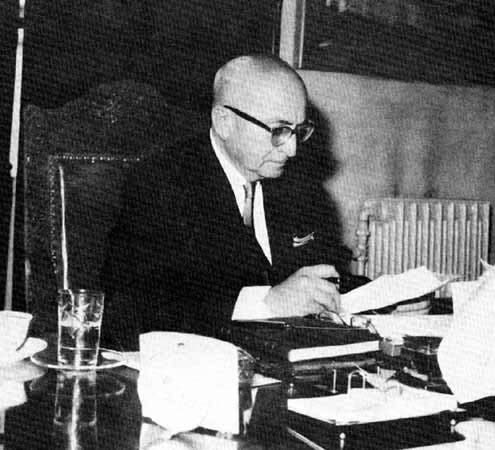
Khalid al-Azm in 1950s

When the union was dissolved he returned to Syria, helped draft the secessionist document himself, and tried to run for presidential office but his candidacy was thwarted by the military. Nazim al-Qudsi was elected, and Azm returned to parliament as deputy for Damascus. On 28 March 1962, yet another coup toppled the civilian administration, and Kudsi and Azm were both imprisoned. On 2 April a counter coup released them, and Azm became Prime Minister again under Kudsi. The two men allied with former president Kuwatli to rid the army of pro-Nasserist elements, and reverse the austere program of nationalization instituted by Nasser when he was head of the UAR. Before this could be achieved, the socialist Ba'ath Party came to power in Syria in March 1963 and both Azm and Qudsi fled into exile.

== Death ==
Azm relocated permanently to Beirut, where he lived in difficult financial circumstances, his vast Syrian holdings having been appropriated by the Ba'athists, before dying on 18 February 1965. His memoirs were published posthumously in 1973.

== Honours and awards ==
=== Foreign honours ===
- (Czechoslovakia) Grand Officer of the Order of the White Lion (1957)

Preceded by Bahij al-Khatib	Interim President of Syria; 4 April – 16 September 1941	Succeeded by Taj al-Din al-Hasani
Preceded by Nasuhi al-Bukhari	Prime Minister of Syria; 4 April – 21 September 1941	Succeeded by Hassan al-Hakim
Preceded by Saadallah al-Jabiri	Prime Minister of Syria (acting); 16—29 December 1946	Succeeded by Jamil Mardam Bey
Preceded by Jamil Mardam Bey	Prime Minister of Syria; 17 December 1948 – 30 March 1949	Succeeded by Husni al-Za'im
Preceded by Nazim al-Kudsi	Prime Minister of Syria; 27 December 1949 – 4 June 1950	Succeeded by Nazim al-Kudsi
Preceded by Nazim al-Kudsi	Prime Minister of Syria; 27 March – 9 August 1951	Succeeded by Hassan al-Hakim
Preceded by Ahmad Bashir al-Azmah	Prime Minister of Syria; 17 September 1962 – 9 March 1963	Succeeded by Salah al-Din al-Bitar
