= Shukri al-Quwatli =

President of Syria (1891–1967)

- شكري القوتلي
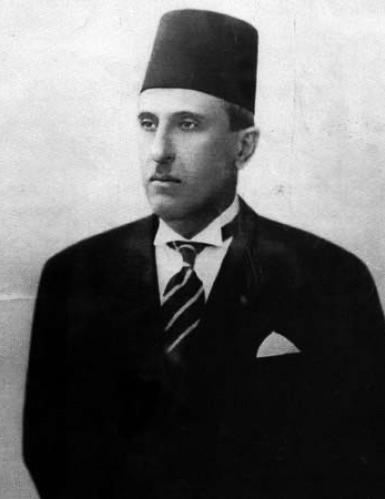

President of Syria
- In office 17 August 1943 – 7 April 1949
- Prime Minister: Saadallah al-Jabiri; Fares al-Khoury; Khalid al-Azm; Jamil Mardam Bey; Husni al-Za'im
- Preceded by: Ata al-Ayyubi
- Succeeded by: Husni al-Za'im (Military Rule)
- In office 6 September 1955 – 22 February 1958
- Prime Minister: Said al-Ghazzi; Sabri al-Asali
- Preceded by: Hashim al-Atassi
- Succeeded by: Gamal Abdel Nasser (United Arab Republic)

Personal details
- Born: 6 May 1891 Damascus, Syria Vilayet, Ottoman Empire
- Died: 30 June 1967 (age 76) Beirut, Lebanon
- Party: National Bloc (until 1947); National Party (from 1947)

Shukri al-Quwatli (Arabic: شكري القوّتلي, romanized: Shukrī al-Quwwatlī; 6 May 1891 – 30 June 1967) was a Syrian politician and statesman who was the first president of post-independence Syria, in 1943.

He began his career as a dissident working towards the independence and unity of the Ottoman Empire's Arab territories and was consequently imprisoned and tortured for his activism. When the Kingdom of Syria was established, Quwatli became a government official, though he was disillusioned with monarchism and co-founded the republican Independence Party. Quwatli was immediately sentenced to death by the French who took control over Syria in 1920, following the Franco-Syrian War. Afterward, he based himself in Cairo where he served as the chief ambassador of the Syrian-Palestinian Congress, cultivating particularly strong ties with Saudi Arabia. Quwatli utilized his connections with Saudi Arabia to help finance the Great Syrian Revolt (1925–1927). In 1930, the French authorities pardoned Quwatli and thereafter, he returned to Syria, where he gradually became a principal leader of the National Bloc. He was elected president of Syria in 1943 and oversaw the country's independence three years later.

Quwatli was reelected in 1948, but was toppled in a military coup in 1949 by Husni al-Za'im. He subsequently went into exile in Egypt, returning to Syria in 1955 to participate in the presidential election, which he won. A conservative presiding over an increasingly leftist-dominated government, Quwatli officially adopted neutralism amid the Cold War. After his request for aid from the United States was denied, he drew closer to the Eastern bloc. He also entered Syria into a defense arrangement with Egypt and Saudi Arabia to confront the influence of the Baghdad Pact. In 1957, Quwatli, who the US and the Pact countries attempted but failed to oust, sought to stem the leftist tide in Syria, but to no avail. By then, his political authority had receded as the military bypassed Quwatli's jurisdiction by independently coordinating with Quwatli's erstwhile ally, Egyptian president Gamal Abdel Nasser.

Following months of unity talks, in 1958, Quwatli merged Syria with Egypt to form the United Arab Republic and stepped down for Nasser to serve as president. In gratitude, Nasser awarded Quwatli the honorary title of "First Arab Citizen". However, Quwatli grew disenchanted with the union, believing it had reduced Syria to a police state subordinate to Egypt. He backed Syria's secession in 1961, but plans for him to complete his presidential term afterward did not materialize. Quwatli left Syria following the 1963 Ba'athist coup, and he died of a heart attack in Lebanon weeks after Syria's defeat in the 1967 Six-Day War. He was buried in Damascus on 1 July.

== Personal life ==
=== Family ===
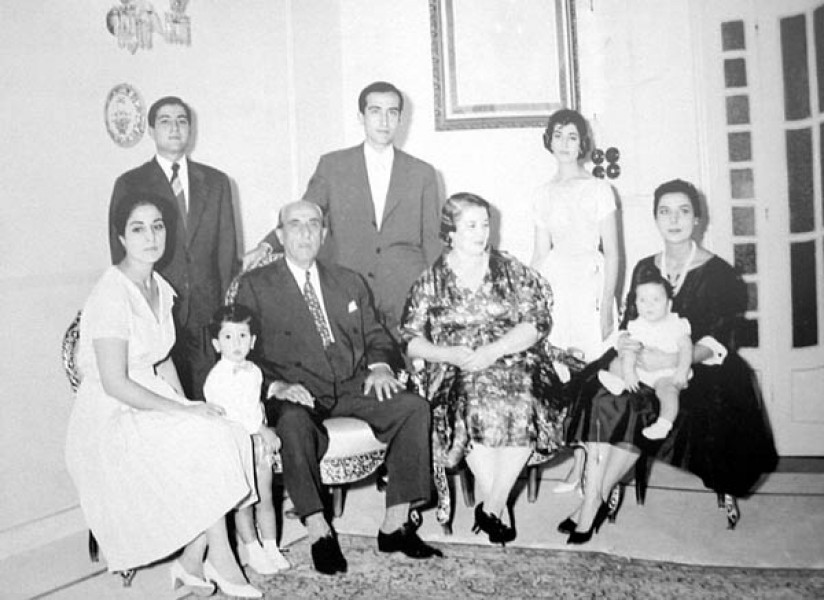
Quwatli and members of his family in Beirut 1966. From Left: Huda, Mahmud, Shukri al-Quwatli, Hassan, Bahira al-Dalati, Hala and Hana.

The Quwatlis were a Sunni Muslim mercantile family from Baghdad which moved to Damascus in the 18th century, establishing itself in the district of al-Shaghour. Their initial wealth in Damascus stemmed from trade with Baghdad and Arabia. After 1860 the family invested part of its wealth in large land tracts in the Ghouta farms surrounding Damascus. The first member of the family to own extensive tracts was Shukri's granduncle Murad (d. 1908). The family's notable status was owed to their wealth, rather than an aristocratic or religious lineage, and their traditional spheres of activity were commerce and the Ottoman civil service.

Shukri's grandfather Abd al-Ghani was involved in finance, as was his granduncle Ahmad, who was appointed the president of the Agricultural Bank of Damascus in 1894, and another granduncle, Hasan, president of the Chamber of Agriculture and Commerce, while Murad had become a member of the Administrative Council of the city in 1871 and was re-elected in the early 1890s. Shukri's father's wealth rested on the highly fertile lands he owned and later bequeathed to Shukri and his siblings in the Ghouta. His elder brother Hasan was elected President of the Damascus Chamber of Commerce and Agriculture. Despite the substantial wealth accrued toward the end of the 19th century, the family remained in the working class al-Shaghur and developed networks there which contributed to its future political ambitions.

In 1928, Shukri married Bahira al-Dalati, the 19-year-old daughter of nationalist Said al-Dalati, whom Quwatli met while in jail in 1916. Shukri and Bahira had five children; Hassan (the oldest, born in 1935), Mahmud, Huda, Hana and Hala. Bahira al-Dalati died in 1989.

=== Childhood and education ===
Shukri Quwatli was born in Damascus in 1891. He received his elementary education at a Jesuit school in the city, then studied at the preparatory high school of Maktab Anbar in the Jewish quarter of Damascus. He obtained his baccalauréat in 1908. He then moved to Istanbul where he studied political science and public administration. Quwatli graduated from the Mekteb-i Mülkiye in 1913. He returned to Damascus in 1913 after receiving his diploma, and started working for the Ottoman civil service.

==== Early influences ====
Quwatli was initially brought up in a pro-Ottoman environment, owing to his family's connections in Istanbul. The restrictions of the Abdul Hamid II era, however, started to be felt around the Ottoman Empire, and discontent was brewing even among the empire's elite. Following the Young Turk Revolution against Abdul Hamid II in 1908, parliamentary elections were called in all provinces, and liberal Arab intellectuals like Shukri al-Asali, Shafiq Muayyad al-Azm, and Rushdi al-Shama'a secured seats as deputies (members of the legislature) representing Damascus. The liberal current that established itself through these figures, and the political dailies they established including al-Qabas ("The Firebrand") and al-Ikha' al-Arabi ("Arab Brotherhood"), greatly influenced Quwatli and other Arab youths.

During the 31 March Incident, Quwatli strongly supported the Committee of Union and Progress (CUP) against Abdul Hamid II. Nevertheless, after the failed countercoup, the CUP accused Arab provinces of supporting Abdul Hamid II and initiated a policy of Turkification, whereby all local officials were substituted by Turkish ones. Soon after, the parliament was dissolved, and the liberal Arab politicians were forced out in the following elections.

== Early nationalist activities ==
Quwatli's early involvement in the Arab nationalist movement came through the Arab Congress of 1913. Shortly after starting his career at the Ottoman civil service in Damascus, he received an invitation to attend the conference in Paris. However, the conference was strongly condemned by the Ottoman authorities, and Arab notables were forbidden from attending. Nevertheless, the congress had succeeded in rousing nationalist feelings in Arab provinces. Quwatli's first confrontation with the Ottoman authorities came in February 1914 during a visit by Jamal Pasha, the governor of Syria at the time, to the offices of the Governorate of Damascus, where Quwatli worked. During the visit, Quwatli refused to follow the normal protocol—bending over and kissing Jamal Pasha's right hand—and was promptly thrown in prison at the Citadel of Damascus. He was bailed out of prison a few days later through his family's connections, but he lost his job at the civil service.

=== Al-Fatat ===
The growing hardships in the country during the early years of World War I pushed Quwatli to join the secret society of al-Fatat, which was facilitated by his childhood friend and co-founder, Nasib al-Bakri. Al-Fatat was an underground organization established in Paris in 1911 by Arab nationalists with the aim of gaining independence and unity of the various Arab territories in the Ottoman Empire. In 1913, the society established its main branch in Damascus, and was successful in attracting the Syrian elite into its ranks.

In 1915, Sharif Hussein, trying to garner support for his planned uprising against the Ottomans, sent his son Faisal to Damascus to lobby the Syrian notables on his behalf. Faisal, a member of al-Fatat himself, met secretly with other members of the society, including Quwatli, in the house of Nasib al-Bakri. When the Ottoman authorities learned of the meeting, they ordered the arrest of al-Bakri and his two brothers, Fawzi and Sami, accusing them of treason. Quwatli was charged by the al-Fatat leadership with the task of facilitating their escape, in which he succeeded. In retaliation, Ottoman authorities placed him under arrest, in which he was subjected to torture and humiliation. Nevertheless, Quwatli refused to confess to anything, and his captors failed to implicate him in the operation so they released him a month later. The tremendous pressure of that experience, however, took its toll on the young Quwatli, and upon his release he retired to his country house in Saidnaya and stopped all contacts with members of al-Fatat and the opposition.

In late 1916 he was approached by Fasih al-Ayyubi in hope that Quwatli could help him secure an escape route for his ailing father, Shukri al-Ayyubi, who was arrested by the Ottomans, like he did for Nasib al-Bakri. However, despite Quwatli's refusal to help, Ottoman authorities tracked down the contact and arrested both men. Quwatli was subjected to further torture to coerce him to reveal the names of his al-Fatat colleagues. In an attempt to prevent himself from surrendering the names, Quwatli tried to commit suicide. After cutting his wrists, Quwatli's life was saved at the last minute by fellow inmate, al-Fatat member and practicing doctor, Ahmad Qadri. He spent four more months in jail, before being released on bail by his relative, Shafiq al-Quwatli, who served as a deputy at the Ottoman Parliament, on 28 January 1917. His experience in jail and the story about his attempted suicide turned Quwatli into a nationalist hero in Syria.

== Kingdom of Syria ==
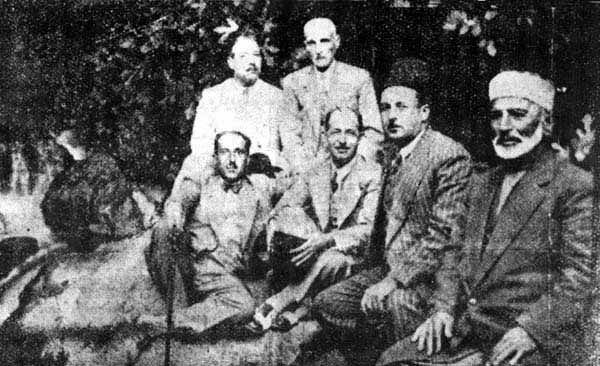
Quwatli (first from the bottom left) seated with members of the Syrian nationalist movement, 1920s. Seated next to Quwatli are Said al-Ghazzi, Riad al-Shurbaji, Sheikh Saleh al-Ali. Standing left to right are Hajj Adib Kheir and Ibrahim Hananu

On 1 October 1918, an Arab army under the leadership of Emir Faisal and British general T. E. Lawrence entered Damascus, and by the end of October the rest of Ottoman Syria fell to the Allied Forces. Emir Faisal became in charge of administering the liberated territory. He appointed Rida al-Rikabi as prime minister, and Quwatli's friend, Nasib al-Bakri became a personal adviser to the Emir. Quwatli, at the age of twenty-six, was appointed assistant to the governor of Damascus, Alaa al-Din al-Durubi.

However, many of Quwatli's generation were unimpressed with Faisal's leadership skills, and were drawn to a republican, rather than monarchist, view of governance. Furthermore, they were suspicious of Faisal, and his brother Abdullah's ties with the British. On 15 April 1919 they founded a loose coalition under the name of al-Istiqlal Party ("Independence Party"). The party had a pan-Arab, secular, anti-British and anti-Hashemite outlook and attracted mostly youth activists from the elite classes. Well-known members, other than Quwatli, included Adil Arslan, Nabih al-Azmeh, Riad al-Sulh, Saadallah al-Jabiri, Ahmad Qadri, Izzat Darwaza and Awni Abd al-Hadi. Although ostensibly working for the government, Quwatli devoted his efforts to nationalist activities outside the government's auspices. In addition to al-Istiqlal, he was also a member of the Palestinian-led Arab Club's Damascus branch.

In a meeting with the 1919 King–Crane Commission, sent by the United States (US) to gauge national sentiment in greater Syria, Quwatli rejected the notion of an American military presence in Syria, telling Crane that "Reduction of sovereignty is non-negotiable" and instead suggesting that the US help Syrians to "build their state and live in peace on their land." Nevertheless, French forces had already started landing on the Syrian coast in 1919 to enforce the Sykes–Picot Agreement whereby France and the UK would divide up the former Arab territories of the Ottoman Empire between themselves. In March 1920, the League of Nations granted France a mandate over Syria and Lebanon, and in response Emir Faisal declared himself king of Syria on 8 March 1920. When King Faisal refused to accept the mandate, the French marched on Damascus. Yusuf al-'Azma, minister of defense at the time, led a small force and met the French at the Battle of Maysalun on 23 July 1920. The battle ended in a decisive victory for the French, and the next day French forces occupied Damascus. King Faisal was deported to Europe, and the French Mandate for Syria and the Lebanon was officially declared.

== Leader in Syrian independence movement ==
=== Emissary of the Syrian-Palestinian Congress ===
The French started their rule by sentencing 21 nationalist leaders, including Quwatli, to death on 1 August 1920. Quwatli managed to flee only hours before a warrant for his arrest was issued. From Damascus he fled by car to Haifa in British-mandated Palestine, and soon after to Cairo in Egypt. From there, Quwatli spent the bulk of his time traveling throughout the Arab world and Europe serving as the virtual ambassador of the Syrian-Palestinian Congress. He became the chief link between Arab nationalist activists in Europe and in the Arab world.

In Europe, he particularly frequented Berlin where he worked with the prominent Arab nationalist intellectual Shakib Arslan to proliferate anti-French sentiment, leading the French Mandatory authorities to label Quwatli one of the "most dangerous" Syrian exiles. He developed close ties with Ibn Saud, who by 1925 ruled much of Arabia, having overrun the Hashemites in the Hejaz. Quwatli had a prior relationship with the House of Saud, stemming from his own family's commercial links with the Saudis and Quwatli's friendship with Sheikh Yusuf Yasin, a Syrian adviser to Ibn Saud, who Quwatli had dispatched to Arabia during Faisal's rule. Quwatli, strongly distrustful of the Hashemites, was impressed by Ibn Saud's relatively quick conquest over much of Arabia and saw in the Saudis a strong potential ally against British and French colonial rule in the Middle East. By 1925, Quwatli had solidified his position as the intermediary between Ibn Saud and the Syrian-Palestinian Congress. His acquisition of Saudi funding put him at odds with the Congress's chief financier Michel Lutfallah, however.

=== Financing the Great Syrian Revolt ===
In the summer of 1925 tensions between the Druze chiefs of the Hauran led by Sultan Pasha al-Atrash and the French authorities culminated with the Great Syrian Revolt, which spread throughout Syria within months. While Quwatli's Istiqlal Party lobbied the Grand Mufti of Jerusalem, Amin al-Husseini to set up a financial support network for the rebellion, Quwatli had already secured the funneling of funds and arms from the Hejaz and also diverted some of the military aid to the Jerusalem-based committee. As the revolt's initial momentum began to recede in mid-1926, bickering between opposition leaders, inside and outside of Syria, increased significantly. Quwatli was accused by his rivals in Cairo of pocketing some money he raised and paying off rebels to prevent rebel raids against his family's extensive apricot orchards in the Ghouta. Tensions between Istiqlalists like Quwatli and Arslan and other Syrian nationalist leaders like al-Bakri and Shahbandar, were particularly sharp, with the latter accusing Quwatli of being out of touch from the realities of the revolt, and Quwatli accusing Shahbandar of treason for attempting to stop the insurrection.

=== Role in the National Bloc ===
In late 1927, Quwatli headed the Istiqlal-dominated Executive Committee of the Syrian-Palestinian Congress, although Lutfallah headed a separate rival committee that also called itself the Congress's Executive Committee. Both were based in Cairo. Locally known then as the "apricot king", Quwatli used revenues from his agricultural lands to build up a network of support in the Old City of Damascus. In 1930, Quwatli was allowed to return to Syria under a general amnesty. Thereafter, he joined the National Bloc, the preeminent opposition movement in Syria—though tolerated by the French. Although he opposed the moderate stances of the Bloc's Damascene leaders, he determined he could only remain a major political player by joining the group. He sought to steer it towards a more determined nationalist course and worked to expand his support base, relying on his relationships with residents in some of Damascus' traditionally nationalist neighborhoods (al-Midan and al-Shaghour) and among the city's merchant and emerging industrialist classes. He also worked to draw support from the staunch pan-Arabists of the League of National Action (LNA) beginning in 1933. He managed to co-opt much of the LNA's members by 1935–36 by financing its land development company (which aimed to prevent land sales to Zionist organizations in Palestine) and assigning some of its leaders to the director boards of companies affiliated with the Bloc.

In 1936, as a general strike was underway in the country to demand a renegotiation of the French role in Syria, Quwatli was appointed the Bloc's vice president of internal affairs, but was not part of the treaty negotiation committee which led talks with the French in Paris in March. A new treaty was established by the end of the month, although the French did not ratify it. Between then and fall, Quwatli spearheaded efforts to unify nationalists ranks in Syria, convincing LNA leader Sabri al-Asali to join the Bloc's highest governing body. By enlisting the support of many prominent pan-Arabists like himself, Quwatli strengthened his position within the Bloc, particularly in regards to his chief nationalist rival Jamil Mardam Bey. He was Minister of Finance from 1936 to 1938.

On 20 March 1941, during World War II, when the Vichy French were in control of Syria, Quwatli called for immediate Syrian independence amid a period of food shortages, high unemployment and widespread nationalist rioting in the country. Vichy troops in the country were defeated by the Allied forces in July and Quwatli left Syria during the campaign. He returned in 1942. France officially recognized Syria's independence on 27 September. However, French troops were not withdrawn and national elections were postponed by the French Mandatory authorities.

== First presidential term ==
=== Election of 1943 ===
Prior to the 1943 national elections in French Mandatory Syria, the French authorities attempted to negotiate with Quwatli as head of the National Bloc to issue a treaty that guaranteed an independent Syria's alignment and close military cooperation with France, in return for French help in securing Quwatli's election to the presidency. Quwatli refused, believing the Syrian people would view such negotiations negatively. He was also confident that the National Bloc would win the elections regardless of French support. Quwatli did win the vote, becoming Syria's president on 17 August 1943.

=== Syrian independence ===
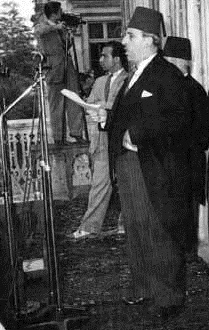
Quwatli declaring Syria's independence from France, 17 April 1946

As president, Quwatli continued to press for Syrian independence from France. In a bid to garner American and British support for his government, he declared war against the Axis powers, aligning Syria with the Allies. Growing countrywide unrest in response to French Mandatory rule led to French military assaults against Damascus and other Syrian cities in May 1945. More French troops were scheduled to land in Syria to aid the authorities, but at Quwatli's request for intervention, British troops invaded Syria from Transjordan, entering Damascus on 1 June. The French military campaign came to an immediate halt as a consequence; the UK and the US had viewed the French military action in Syria as a potential catalyst for further unrest throughout the Middle East and a detriment to British and American lines of communication in the region.

As French troops began a partial withdrawal from the country, Quwatli instructed Fares al-Khoury, his envoy to the US and head of the Syrian mission to the United Nations, to bring the issue of Syria's independence to the United Nations Security Council (UNSC), cabling Khoury to "Go to [US President Harry] Truman and tell him the French have ploughed the land in Syria, over our heads!" Khoury proceeded to petition the UNSC to force France's withdrawal from Syria. The US and UK backed Syria's request and informed Quwatli that British troops were in control of Syria, requesting Quwatli's cooperation in enforcing an evening curfew in the country. Quwatli complied and expressed his gratitude to the British government. At a summit between France, the UK, the US, Russia and China, France agreed to withdraw from both Syria and Lebanon in return for British promises to withdraw its military from the Levant region as well. Quwatli was angered that Syria was left out of the conference and requested a summit with Truman and Winston Churchill, which was rebuffed.

The transfer of administrative powers to the Syrian government began on 1 August, the day in which Quwatli announced the establishment of the Syrian Army and his position as the commander in chief. Quwatli also asked Khoury to form a cabinet, which was established on 24 August. The French completed their withdrawal from Syria on 15 April 1946 and Quwatli declared Syria's independence day on 17 April.

=== Post-independence politics ===
Following Syria's independence, the National Bloc was dissolved and replaced by the National Party. Quwatli's leadership, while supported by older politicians like Asali, Jabiri and Haffar, became increasingly challenged by emerging leaders such as Nazim al-Qudsi of the People's Party and Akram al-Hawrani of the Arab Socialist Party as well as the Baath Party, the Syrian Socialist Nationalist Party (SSNP), the Muslim Brotherhood and the Syrian Communist Party (SCP). Antagonistic relations between Quwatli and the Hashemite kings of Iraq and Jordan, Abdullah I and Faisal II, respectively, increased with the latter two seeking to unite Syria, Iraq and Jordan under Hashemite monarchical rule, and Quwatli countering that Iraq and Jordan join a republican Syria under his leadership instead. The Hashemites found support in the People's Party, which became an influential force in Aleppo, a major city and economic hub of Syria, particularly after the 1947 death of Jabiri, Quwatli's Aleppo-based ally.

In early 1947, Quwatli and the National Party, the largest party in parliament, made an amendment to the constitution to enable Quwatli to seek re-election. The move was met by strong disapproval from rival Syrian parties and opposition politicians, and a campaign to unseat Quwatli in the next presidential election was commenced. Quwatli's allies won 24 out of 127 seats during the 1947 parliamentary election, the first in post-independence Syria, while the opposition won 53 seats and independents unaffiliated with any political party won 50. A number of Quwatli's allies defected from the National Party and former president Atassi retired from politics because of his frustration at Quwatli's handling of Syrian internal affairs. Quwatli tasked Jamil Mardam Bey to form a new cabinet in October, which included mostly pro-Western politicians.

Despite the heavy presence of pro-American figures in the cabinet and Quwatli's initially warm ties with the US, relations between the two countries began to unravel amid the nascent Cold War and the view that Quwatli was becoming a detriment to US interests in the region. Quwatli developed close relations with the SCP and its head Khalid Bakdash, which was a contributing factor to the US Congress's rejection of Quwatli's arms request for the Syrian Army in late 1947. Quwatli also rejected the construction of the Trans-Arabian Pipeline in Syria (to connect the oilfields of Saudi Arabia to Lebanon). Quwatli feared construction of the pipeline would threaten the mostly British-owned Iraq Petroleum Company and upset the UK, as well as the Syrian public, who he believed would view the project "as a new form of indirect foreign economic control", according to Moubayed. US support for Israel, particularly under Truman, and Quwatli's adamant opposition to Zionism was a further source of tension.

== Second presidential term ==
=== Election of 1948 ===
With the constitution amended to allow for a president to seek more than one term, Quwatli ran against Khalid al-Azm for another five-year term and won by a slim majority on 18 April 1948.

=== 1948 Arab-Israeli War ===
Quwatli opposed the proposed partition of the British Mandate of Palestine into separate Jewish and Arab states, arguing that the plan, which would allocate 56% of Palestine to the Jewish state, violated the rights of the Palestinian Arab majority. The proposal passed the UN vote and Syria made war preparations soon afterward, including co-founding the Arab Liberation Army (ALA). Quwatli had proposed the creation of the ALA as a volunteer force to attract fighters from throughout the Arab world and to take the place of Arab regular armies. The ALA's establishment was sponsored by the Arab League following the UN partition vote and Fawzi al-Qawuqji, a Syrian commander who played leading roles in the Great Syrian Revolt and the 1936 revolt in Palestine, was appointed its commander. Quwatli did not believe the armies of Syria and the Arab world were ready to successfully confront Jewish forces and as war drew near in early 1948, he petitioned Abdel Rahman Azzam, head of the Arab League, to not enter Arab armies into Palestine. Instead, Quwatli offered to provide local Palestinian Arab fighters arms and funding. Azzam was not swayed and continued his effort of rallying Arab governments to dispatch their armies. On 15 May, after the establishment of Israel was announced, Quwatli ordered the Syrian Army to enter Palestine immediately.

The Syrian Army, which consisted of 4,500 soldiers, had been mostly repelled in their offensive during the first few days of the war, gaining control over a small area along the Syrian border. As a result of the army's poor showing, Quwatli pressed defense minister Ahmad al-Sharabati to resign his post, which Sharabati did on 24 May. He then replaced chief of staff Abdullah Atfeh with Husni al-Zaim during that same period of the war. Following the war, Quwatli accused Zaim of military incompetence and his officers of profiteering. In turn, Zaim accused Quwatli of mismanagement during the conflict. The Syrian public did not spare Quwatli blame for the army's poor performance, causing his popularity, built on his nationalist reputation, to erode further. The Syrian press was also sharply critical of Quwatli and Prime Minister Mardam Bey, urging them to leave their positions. Mardam Bey resigned on 22 August 1948 and was replaced by Khalid al-Azm.

Mass demonstrations took place in Syria condemning US president Harry Truman for recognizing Israel. Synagogues were attacked in Damascus as were the offices of General Motors. US officials were frustrated at Quwatli for not attempting to stop the demonstrations. When Egypt, Jordan and Lebanon signed armistice agreements with Israel between February and April 1949, Syria under Quwatli did not do so and refused to send a delegation to attend truce negotiations in Rhodes in March.

=== Coup d'état of 1949 ===
On 30 March 1949, Zaim launched a coup d'état, overthrowing Quwatli. Zaim's troops entered Damascus and raided Quwatli's home. They disarmed his guard and confronted Quwatli in his night clothes before army officer Ibrahim al-Husseini arrested him. After being allowed to change his clothes, Quwatli was taken by the authorities to the city's Mezzeh Prison. Prime Minister al-Azm was also arrested. Finally on 7 April, Quwatli and al-Azm resigned. The coup had been backed and allegedly co-planned with the US Central Intelligence Agency. The US was the first country to recognize Zaim's government, followed by the UK, France, and the Hashemite kingdoms of Iraq and Jordan. Quwatli's mother died of a heart attack about a week after his overthrow.

== Exile in Egypt ==
As a result of pressure from the Egyptian and Saudi governments to spare the life of their ally Quwatli, al-Zaim agreed to release Quwatli from prison in mid-April 1949. After officially resigning as President, Quwatli was exiled to Alexandria, Egypt. In Egypt, he was respected as a guest of honor by King Farouk and after the July 1952 revolution, by the Free Officers who gained power. Despite his positive relationship with the ousted King Farouk, Quwatli developed a close friendship with the founder of the Free Officers, Gamal Abdel Nasser, who became Egypt's leader in 1954.

== Third presidential term ==
=== Elections of 1955 ===
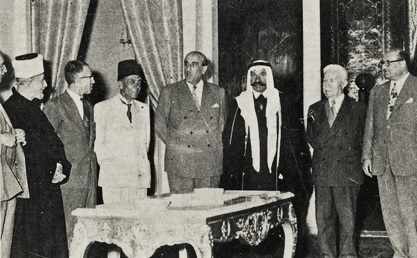
Syrian and Palestinian leaders meeting Quwatli at the presidential palace, 1955. From right to left: Sabri al-Asali, Fares al-Khoury, Sultan Pasha al-Atrash, Quwatli, Mohamed Ali Eltaher, Nazim al-Qudsi, Amin al-Husayni and Muin al-Madi

Quwatli returned to Syria in 1955, following the ouster of President Adib al-Shishakli and during the presidency of Hashim al-Atassi. Quwatli entered his candidacy in the August 1955 presidential elections, at the age of 63. Required to secure a two-thirds majority in the 142-member Syrian Parliament in order to win, Quwatli defeated his main opponent Khalid al-Azm 89 to 42 (a further six votes were cast as invalid) in the first round. This prompted a second round of voting, in which Quwatli won the presidency with 91 votes against Azm's 41 (a further five votes were blank and two invalid.) Quwatli's bid for the presidency was supported by the governments of Egypt and Saudi Arabia, both of which were allied in their opposition to the Baghdad Pact as was Quwatli.

Prime Minister Sabri al-Asali resigned from his post on 6 September following the Ba'ath Party's withdrawal from the cabinet. As a result, Quwatli attempted to nominate Lutfi al-Haffar as Prime Minister, but reneged after opposition from the Ba'athists. Afterward, Quwatli asked Rushdi al-Kikhiya to form a cabinet, but the latter refused, citing that influence from the Syrian Army would deprive his government of real power. President Nasser of Egypt recommended the reappointment of Asali, but Quwatli refused, instead opting for Said al-Ghazzi, an independent. Ghazzi agreed and subsequently presided over a national unity government.

=== Adoption of neutralism ===
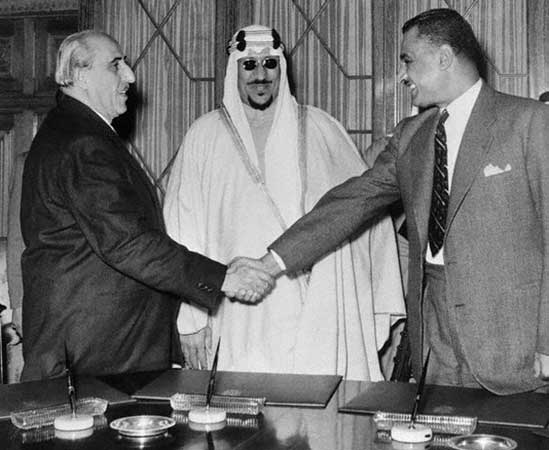
Quwatli (left) with President Gamal Abdel Nasser of Egypt (right) and King Saud of Saudi Arabia (center) concluding a defense agreement between the three countries, 1956

Under Quwatli's leadership, Syria increasingly moved towards a neutralist policy amid the Cold War, despite the conservative views held by Quwatli. However, on 10 September, Quwatli first opted to make an official request for arms from the United States, but was eventually rebuffed despite support from US Secretary of State John Foster Dulles. Starting in 1956, Quwatli began to look towards the Eastern bloc for economic and military assistance. During the tenure of his administration, Quwatli furthered Syria's relations with other neutralist countries such as Yugoslavia, India and Egypt, but also with the Soviet Union (USSR) and the Eastern bloc. The pursuit of this policy was partially due to the support afforded to the leftist movements in Syria by the Saudi and Egyptian governments who viewed them as strong opponents of the Baghdad Pact, and the highly influential leftist factions of the Syrian Army. Quwatli and Nasser initiated the Egyptian-Syrian Agreement, a defense arrangement that would serve as a counterweight to the Baghdad Pact, in March 1955. The agreement stipulated that each country would assist the other in case of an attack, the establishment of numerous committees to coordinate joint military activities and the creation of a joint military command headed by Egyptian officer Abdel Hakim Amer. The agreement was concluded 20 October.

Increasingly concerned at the growing leftist trend in the country, Quwatli called for a national unity government that would include parties from across the political spectrum on 15 February 1956. Despite opposition from the Ba'athists, Quwatli managed to preside over a "national covenant" which entailed a foreign policy of opposition to Zionism and imperialism as well as the adoption of neutralism amid the Cold War. Nonetheless, and against Quwatli's advice, Ghazzi resigned from his post in June 1956 as a result of pressure from the Ba'athists and the communists who had been leading protests against Ghazzi's decision to lift the ban on wheat sales to Western Europe. Faced with few options, Quwatli reappointed Asali as Prime Minister. Asali moved to further strengthen ties with Egypt, including a pledge to start unity talks, and appointed Ba'athists to the ministerial positions of economy and foreign affairs.

Following the tripartite invasion of the Sinai Peninsula and the Suez Canal by British, French and Israeli forces in October 1956, Quwatli severed ties with Britain. Quwatli sent hundreds of army recruits to aid the Egyptian defense and made an emergency visit to Moscow to request Soviet backing for Nasser from Premier Nikita Khrushchev, telling the latter that the tripartite forces "want to destroy Egypt!" In response to public pressure, in late December Prime Minister Asali reshuffled his cabinet, removing several fellow conservatives and strengthening leftist influence in the government.

=== Confronting leftist influence ===
In July 1957, relations between Quwatli's ally Saudi Arabia and the governments of Iraq and Jordan, rivals of Syria, warmed considerably to the protestations of the leftist current in Syria, which viewed the growing ties between the region's conservative monarchies with distress. After a series of public criticisms of King Saud by an array of Syrian political figures, including al-Azm, Michel Aflaq and Akram al-Hawrani, Saud froze Syrian assets in Saudi Arabia and withdrew his ambassador from Syria in protest. In response to the crisis between the two countries, an alarmed Quwatli ordered Asali to publicly distance his government from the anti-Saudi views of some in the Syrian Parliament and press, and to publicly apologize to Saud. In addition, Quwatli personally issued a government order to shut down the communist newspaper Al Sarkha.

On 6 August, Quwatli established a long-term agreement with the USSR, entailing a long-term Soviet loan to fund development works in Syria and the Soviet purchase of a large portion of Syrian agricultural and textile surpluses. US fears that Syria was approaching a communist takeover had prompted an attempted CIA-sponsored coup to replace the Quwatli government with former president Shishakli. However, the coup plot was foiled by the head of Syrian intelligence, Abdel Hamid al-Sarraj, on 12 August and Syria consequently expelled the US military attaché from Damascus. The US, which denied the coup plot, responded by expelling the Syrian ambassador from Washington and recalling its ambassador from Syria.

Leftist influence in Syria grew further in the immediate wake of the crisis; on 15 August, a high-ranking officer from Sidon, Lebanon with Marxist leanings, Afif Bizri, was appointed army chief of staff, and several mid-level officers were replaced with communist officers. Quwatli flew to Egypt amid apparent plans to resign from the presidency in favor of the Soviet-leaning Azm. However, he returned to Syria on 26 August. Tensions had been rising as rumors swept the region regarding a US-backed Turkish or joint Iraqi-Jordanian invasion of Syria to prevent a potential communist takeover. Quwatli's earlier success in repairing ties between Syria and Saudi Arabia proved particularly useful during this period. Saud immediately lent his full support to Quwatli, whom he viewed as a significant counterweight to the leftist movement, by rebuffing President Dwight D. Eisenhower's appeal to endorse the Eisenhower Doctrine, a policy aimed at containing communist and Arab nationalist influence in the Middle East. He also accepted an invitation to Damascus by Quwatli on 25 August, publicly stating that Saudi Arabia would support Syria in any aggression against it. Iraqi Prime Minister Ali Jawdat also proclaimed support for Syria when he visited on 26 August, in spite of support for an attack by the Iraqi monarchy. Both Saud and Jawdat privately criticized Syria's leadership for increasing dependence on the Eastern bloc.

Nonetheless, the US and its allies in the Baghdad Pact genuinely feared that Syria was becoming a satellite of the Soviets and decided in a September meeting that Quwatli's government had to be removed. That same month Turkish troops massed along the border with Syria. On 13 October, Nasser, who had launched a radio campaign denouncing the Baghdad Pact countries, dispatched 1,500 Egyptian troops, a mostly symbolic force, to the port of Latakia in northern Syria in a show of Arab strength against Turkey, to the acclaim of the Syrian and pan-Arab public. The leaders of Jordan and Iraq promptly reassured Quwatli that they had no intention to interfere in Syria's internal affairs. Nasser had apparently bypassed his ally Quwatli, coordinating the deployment with officers Sarraj and Bizri instead. Quwatli related this fact to Saud, who had complained of not being consulted of the Egyptian move beforehand, an "admission ... of Quwatli's political irrelevance," according to contemporary historian Salim Yaqub.

Sarraj and Bizri wielded substantial influence in Syrian politics, checking the power of the political factions and purging Nasser's opponents from the officer corps. This was a source of concern for Quwatli, but he kept both men in their posts, partially due to pressure from Nasser. Quwatli further solidified his ties with the latter by appointing Akram al-Hawrani, the prominent Arab socialist leader, as speaker of parliament, and Salah al-Din Bitar, the co-founder of the pan-Arabist Ba'ath Party, as foreign affairs minister.

=== Unity with Egypt ===
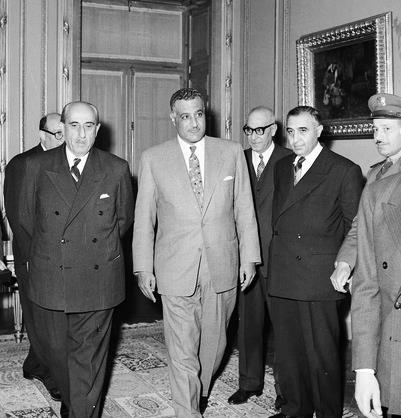
Quwatli and Nasser at final meeting of Syrian-Egyptian unity talks in Cairo. Sabri al-Asali is behind Quwatli, Salah al-Din al-Bitar is the second to Nasser's left and Afif Bizri is to al-Bitar's left, February 1958

Amid the euphoria generated by Egypt's military intervention, serious unity discussions commenced between Syria and Egypt. Towards the end of October, Anwar al-Sadat, the Egyptian speaker of parliament, visited the Syrian parliament in Damascus in a gesture of solidarity, only for the visit to end with the Syrian parliament voting unanimously to enter into a union with Egypt without delay. A Syrian delegation then headed for Cairo to persuade Nasser to accept unity with Syria, but Nasser expressed his reservations regarding unity to the delegates and Quwatli, who was in Damascus. Nasser was wary of the Syrian military's habitual interference in the country's political affairs and the stark difference in the countries' economies and political systems. The Syrian political and military leadership continued to press Nasser out of both sincere commitment to Arab nationalism and a realization that only unification with Egypt could prevent impending strife in the country due to increasing communist influence.

In December, the Ba'ath Party composed a proposal entailing federal unity with Egypt, prompting their communist rivals to propose a total union. While the communists were less eager to merge with Egypt, they sought to appear before the Syrian public as the group most dedicated to unity, privately believing Nasser would reject the offer as he had the first time. According to historian Adeed Dawisha, "the communists ended up outmaneuvering themselves ... unprepared for the unfolding events spearheaded by a public driven to frenzy by all talk and promises of union." On 11 January 1958, the communist chief-of-staff, Bizri, led an officers delegation to press for unity with Cairo without consulting Quwatli beforehand. Instead, the Egyptian ambassador, Mahmud Riad, met and notified Quwatli of Bizri's move. Quwatli was angered at the military's move, telling Riad that it amounted to a coup and Egypt was complicit.

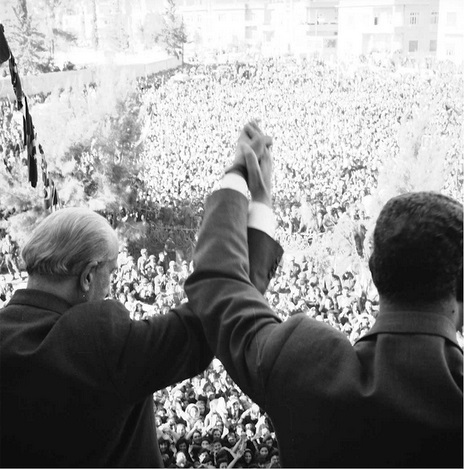
Quwatli clasps hands with Nasser before crowds of spectators in Damascus days after the United Arab Republic is established, March 1958

To assert his influence over the unity talks, Quwatli sent Foreign Minister al-Bitar to Cairo on 16 January to join the discussions. Nasser, while still hesitant at the Syrian proposal and discouraged by members of his inner circle, became increasingly concerned with the communists' power in Syria as testified by Bizri's leadership and autonomy from Quwatli. He was further pressured by the Arab nationalist members of the delegation, including al-Bitar, who alluded to an impending communist takeover and urgently appealed to him not to "abandon" Syria.

Nasser ultimately agreed to the union, but insisted that it be formed strictly on his terms, stipulating a one-party system, a merged economy, and Syria's adoption of Egyptian social institutions; in effect a full-blown union. Syria's political leaders, particularly the communists, the Ba'athists and the conservatives, viewed Nasser's terms unfavorably, but nonetheless accepted them in response to mounting popular pressure. Quwatli left for Cairo in mid-February to conclude the agreement with Nasser and on 22 February the United Arab Republic (UAR) was established. Quwatli resigned from the presidency and Nasser became the president of the new union. To honor Quwatli for his gesture and his longtime struggle in the Arab nationalist cause, Nasser accorded him the title of "First Arab Citizen."

The announcement of the UAR was met with widespread jubilation and celebration throughout the Arab world, most prominently in Syria. Nasser arrived in Damascus on an unannounced visit on 24 February and went directly to Quwatli's home. According to al-Hawrani, as Nasser met with Quwatli, "a sea of colliding humanity gathered with astonishing speed" as residents left their workplaces and homes to meet the leaders at Quwatli's house. When the two decided to leave for the official guesthouse in an open-top automobile, it took them two hours to reach the destination, where it normally would have taken about five minutes. The commotion of the growing crowds surrounding the car caused Quwatli to nearly faint. Following the union's establishment, Quwatli retired from politics.

== Later life ==
By 1960, Quwatli had quarreled with Nasser and criticized his policies in Syria. In particular, he condemned the institution of land distribution and industrial nationalization in July 1961, stating it would harm the economy severely. He was also personally affronted that his son-in-law Fayez al-Ujl had much of his property seized by the government as part of the socialist measures. Resentment towards the union across the spectrum of Syria's political class, social elite and officer corps was on the rise, with these key groups chafing at the centralization of authority into Nasser's hands, domination by a vastly larger Egypt at the political, social and economic levels and the sidelining of these groups in the governance of Syria. The Syrian public also grew wary of the virtual police state set up in the country by Sarraj. A coup by secessionist officers was undertaken in Syria on 28 September, effectively breaking up the UAR. Quwatli lent his support toward the coup, aligning himself with the secessionist officers.

On 23 October, he made a televised speech condemning the UAR and expressing his disappointment with Nasser, saying "unity does not mean annexation and the presidential system does not mean the separation of the ruler from the ruled." He also accused the Egyptian authorities of establishing a system of rule dependent on "1,001 spies" and responsible for sowing division in the republic. Quwatli told the Syrian people they controlled their own destiny, saying "Ranks and titles come and go, but you the people are immortal!" He concluded his speech with self-criticism, stating "I was able to serve your struggle as an ordinary citizen more than I was able to serve you when I was president."

The secessionist officers, pleased at Quwatli's statements, discussed whether or not to have Quwatli serve another term as president or to finish the term he began in 1955, which was cut about one year short as a result of the UAR's establishment. The proposal did not manifest, largely due to Quwatli's relatively old age at the time. On 8 March 1963 a coalition of unionist officers consisting of Ba'athists, Nasserists and independent Arab nationalists overthrew the secessionist government of President Nazim al-Qudsi and Prime Minister Khalid al-Azm. Quwatli left Syria shortly after and moved to Beirut, Lebanon.

== Death ==
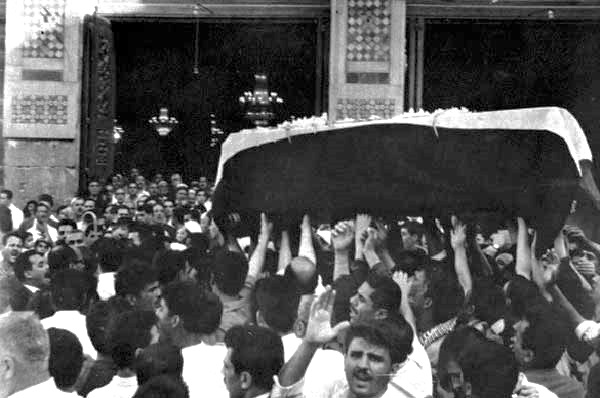
Quwatli's coffin being carried by mourners during his funeral procession at the Umayyad Mosque in Damascus

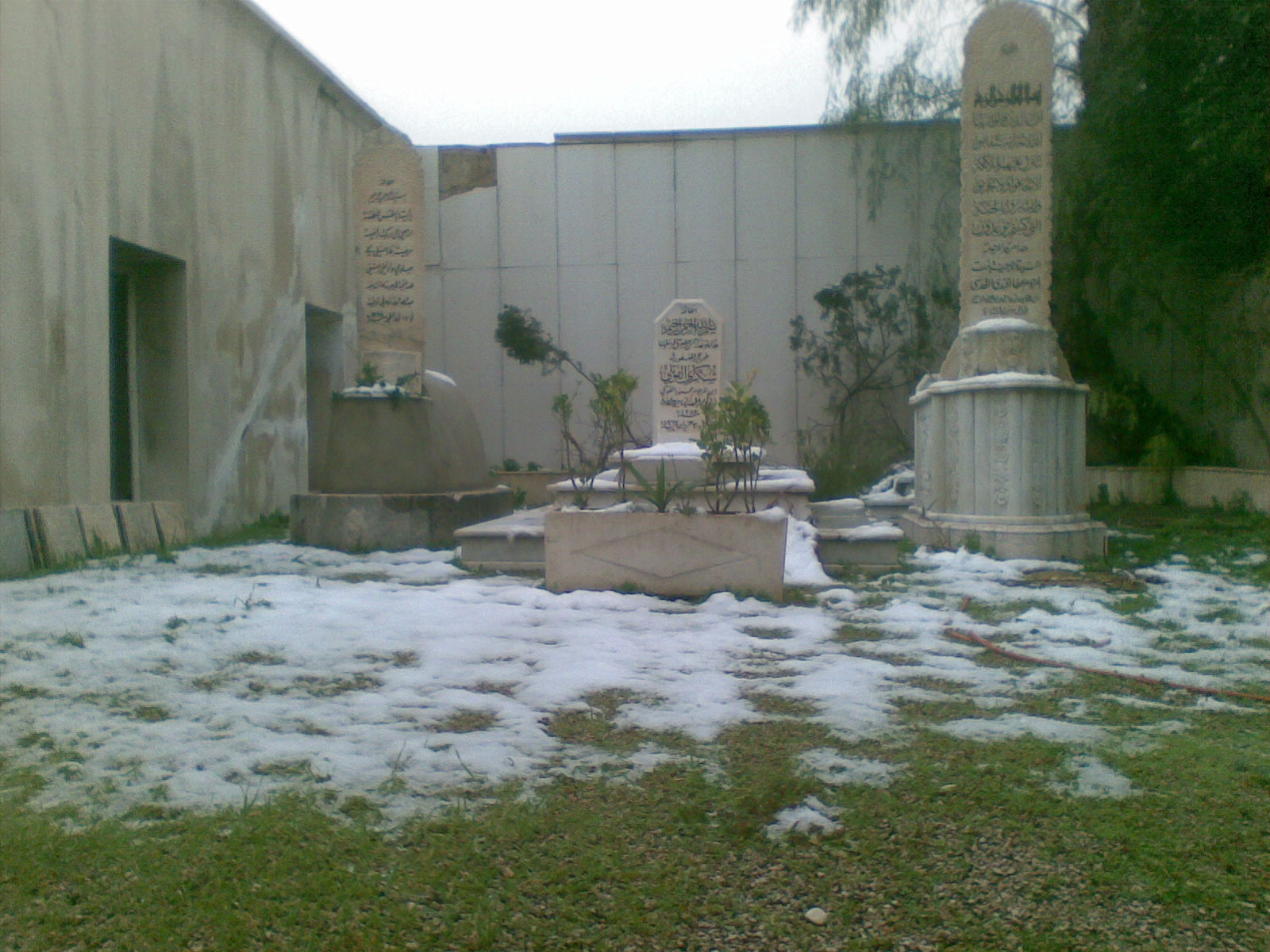
Quwatli's grave in Damascus

Quwatli died of a heart attack shortly after the Six-Day War (5–10 June 1967). Feeling a pain in his chest, he was taken to a hospital on 29 June. He died in Beirut on 30 June. According to Syrian historian Sami Moubayed, Quwatli died after learning of the defeat of the Syrian and Arab armies. The Ba'athist government refused to allow Quwatli's body to be buried in Damascus and only relented after diplomatic pressure from King Faisal of Saudi Arabia. An honorary funeral organized by the state was held for him on 1 July 1967.

== Legacy ==
On the day of his funeral, Radio Damascus called Quwatli "one of the sons of this homeland who has sacrificed and struggled for the advancement, liberation and unity of the Arab nation." He was proclaimed a founding father of the Syrian Arab Republic. Historians and the Syrian population generally consider Quwatli to be one of the most "renowned Syrian leaders of the twentieth century," according to Moubayed.

== Bibliography ==
- Arnakis, George Geogiades (1973), The Near East in Modern Times: Second World War and after, 1940–1960, Pemberton Press
- Blum, William (2003), Killing Hope: US Military and CIA Interventions Since World War II, Zed Books, ISBN 978-1-84277-369-7
- Chaitani, Youssef (2007), Post-Colonial Syria and Lebanon: The Decline of Arab Nationalism and the Triumph of the State, I. B. Tauris, ISBN 978-1-84511-294-3
- Dawisha, Adeed (2009), Arab Nationalism in the Twentieth Century: From Triumph to Despair, Princeton: Princeton University Press, ISBN 978-0-691-12272-4
- Ginat, Rami (2010), Syria and the Doctrine of Arab Neutralism: From Independence to Dependence, Sussex Academic Press, ISBN 978-1-84519-396-6
- Hardy, Roger (2019) [2016], The Poisoned Well: Empire and Its Legacy in the Middle East, Oxford University Press, ISBN 9780190056339
- Jankowski, James P. (2001), Nasser's Egypt, Arab Nationalism, and the United Arab Republic, Lynne Rienner Publishers, ISBN 1-58826-034-8
- Khoury, Philip S. (November 1981), "Factionalism among Syrian Nationalists during the French Mandate", International Journal of Middle East Studies, 13 (4), Cambridge University Press: 441–469, doi:10.1017/s0020743800055859, S2CID 154033247
- Khoury, Philip S. (1983), Urban Notables and Arab Nationalism: The Politics of Damascus 1860-1920, Cambridge University Press, ISBN 0-521-24796-9
- Khoury, Philip S. (1997), "The Paradoxical in Arab Nationalism Interwar Syria Revisited", in Israel Gershoni; James P. Jankowski (eds.), Rethinking Nationalism in the Arab Middle East, New York: Columbia University Press
- Lentz, Harry (2014), Heads of States and Governments Since 1945, Routledge, ISBN 978-1-134-26490-2
- Moubayed, Sami M. (2000), Damascus Between Democracy and Dictatorship, University Press of America, ISBN 978-0-7618-1744-4
- Moubayed, Sami M. (2006), Steel & Silk: Men and Women who shaped Syria 1900–2000, Cune Press, ISBN 978-1-885942-41-8
- Moubayed, Sami M. (2012), Syria and the USA: Washington's Relations with Damascus from Wilson to Eisenhower, I. B. Tauris, ISBN 978-1-84885-705-6
- Muslih, Muhammad (1990), "al-Quwatli, Shukri", in Reich, Bernard (ed.), Political Leaders of the Contemporary Middle East and North Africa: A Biographical Dictionary, Greenwood Publishing Group, pp. 433–440, ISBN 0-313-26213-6
- Tucker, Spencer C.; Roberts, Priscilla (2008), The Encyclopedia of Middle East Wars: The United States in the Persian Gulf, Afghanistan, and Iraq Conflicts, ABC-CLIO, ISBN 978-1-85109-948-1
- Yaqub, Salim (2004), Containing Arab Nationalism: The Eisenhower Doctrine and the Middle East, University of North Carolina Press, ISBN 0-8078-5508-1
- Yitzhak, Ronen (2012), Abdullah Al-Tall - Arab Legion Officer: Arab Nationalism and Opposition to the Hashemite Regime, Apollo Books, ISBN 978-1-84519-408-6

Political offices
Preceded by 'Ata' Bay al-Ayyubi	President of Syria; 1943–1949	Succeeded by Husni az-Zaim (military rule)
Preceded by Hashim al-Atassi	President of Syria; 1955–1958	Succeeded by Gamal Abdel Nasser (UAR)
