= Saadallah al-Jabiri =

Syrian politician

- سعد الله الجابري
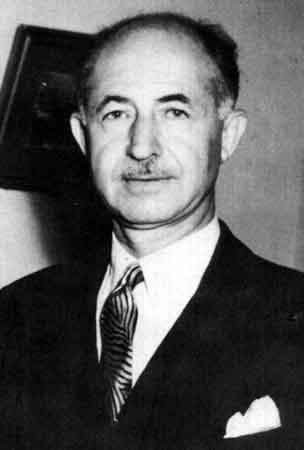

15th Prime Minister of Syria
- In office 19 August 1943 – 14 October 1944
- President: Shukri al-Quwatli
- Preceded by: Jamil al-Ulshi
- Succeeded by: Faris al-Khoury
- In office 1 October 1945 – 16 December 1946
- President: Shukri al-Quwatli
- Preceded by: Faris al-Khoury
- Succeeded by: Khalid al-Azm

Minister of Foreign Affairs and Expatriates
- In office 1936–1939
- President: Hashim al-Atassi
- Preceded by: Aladdin al-Droubi
- Succeeded by: Fayez al-Khoury
- In office 1945–1946
- President: Shukri al-Quwatli
- Preceded by: Mikhail Ilyan
- Succeeded by: Naim Antaki

Speaker of the Parliament of Syria
- In office 17 October 1944 – 15 September 1945
- Preceded by: Faris al-Khoury
- Succeeded by: Faris al-Khoury

Personal details
- Born: 1893 Aleppo, Ottoman Syria, Ottoman Empire
- Died: 1947 (aged 54) Aleppo, First Syrian Republic
- Party: National Bloc

Saadallah al-Jabiri (Arabic: سعد الله الجابري, romanized: Saʿd Allāh al-Jābirī; 1893–1947) was a Syrian statesman and politician who served as the two-time prime minister and a two-time Minister of Foreign Affairs and Expatriates of Syria.

Jabiri was exiled by the French authorities to the village of Douma in North Lebanon, where he rented the house of Melhim Kheir. His mother was from a Beiruti family. His sister, Fayza al-Jabiri, was married to Riad Al Solh, two-time prime minister of Lebanon.

The Saadallah al-Jabiri Square in central Aleppo city is named after him.

Preceded by Jamil al-Ulshi	Prime Minister of Syria; 19 August 1943 – 14 October 1944	Succeeded by Faris al-Khoury
Preceded by Faris al-Khoury	Prime Minister of Syria; 1 October 1945 – 16 December 1946	Succeeded by Khalid al-Azm

Preceded by Aladdin al-Droubi	Minister of Foreign Affairs and Expatriates; 1936 – 1939	Succeeded by Fayez al-Khoury
Preceded by Mikhail Ilyan	Minister of Foreign Affairs and Expatriates; 1945 - 1946	Succeeded by Naim Antaki
