= List of presidents of Syria =

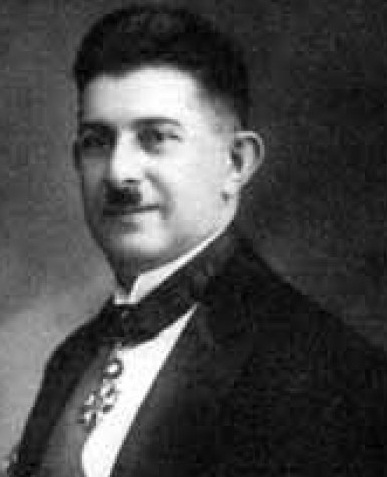
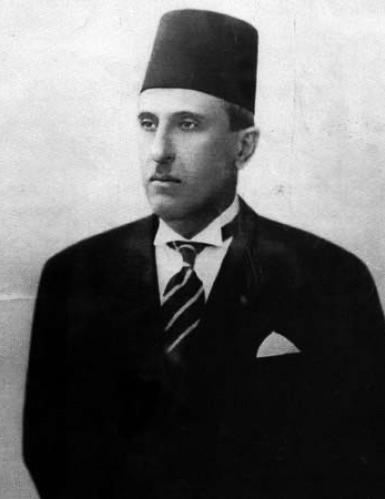
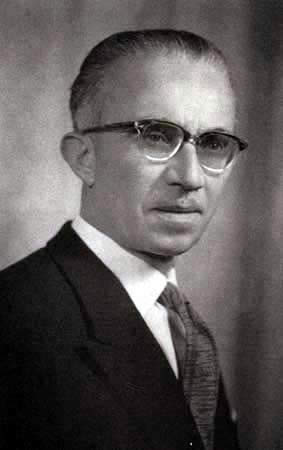
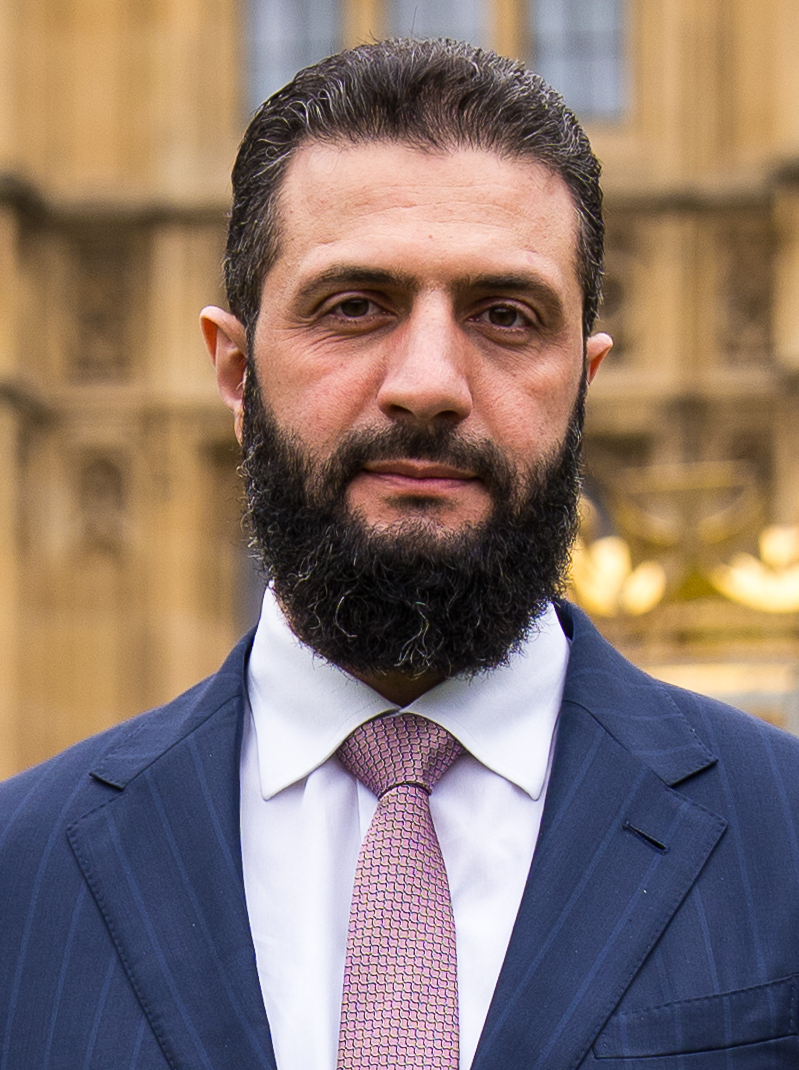
- Top left: Subhi Bey Barakat was the first president under the Syrian Federation.
- Top right: Shukri al-Quwatli, the first president of post-independence Syria.
- Bottom left: Nazim al-Qudsi was the last democratically elected president before the 1963 Syrian coup d'état.
- Bottom right: Ahmed al-Sharaa is the current president since 2025.

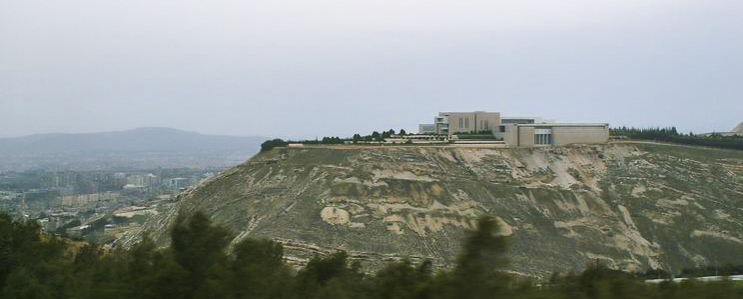
People's Palace, the official residence

This is a list of presidents of Syria since the creation of the office in 1922. Under the current constitutional declaration implemented on 13 March 2025, the president of Syria serves as both the head of state and head of government. The president directs the executive branch of the Syrian government, acts as commander-in-chief of the Syrian Armed Forces, represents the nation in international relations, and formalizes treaties with foreign countries. Since the fall of the Assad regime, Syria has been undergoing a political transition as a presidential republic, led by President Ahmed al-Sharaa and his caretaker government, which later became the transitional government. Articles 3 and 34 of the Constitutional Declaration state that the religion of the President of the Republic is Islam, with Islamic jurisprudence as the principal source of legislation, and that in the event of a vacancy in the presidency, the Vice President shall assume the powers of the President of the Republic. As mandated by the Constitutional Declaration, al-Sharaa will serve as president for a five-year transitional period.

The Syrian presidency dates back to 1922, when French authorities established the Syrian Federation under the Mandate for Syria and Lebanon, with Subhi Bey Barakat as its president. The federation was short-lived and was replaced by the State of Syria in 1925. Barakat briefly remained president until the outbreak of the Great Syrian Revolt later that year, which led to his resignation. He was succeeded by Ahmad Nami, who served as president until his removal in 1928. In the following decades, the presidency experienced several changes in leadership, including a coup by Husni al-Za'im in March 1949 and another led by Adib Shishakli in 1951. After the 1958 referendum, Syria joined the United Arab Republic, and its president, Gamal Abdel Nasser, also became president of Syria. This union lasted three years until the 1961 coup restored Syria's independence and the 1950 constitution.

The 1963 coup d'état, carried out by the Arab Socialist Ba'ath Party, established a one-party state. Internal power struggles within Ba'athist factions led to further coups in 1966 and 1970, the latter bringing Hafez al-Assad to power. Under Assad, Syria became a hereditary dictatorship. After his death in 2000, his son Bashar al-Assad succeeded him and ruled until his overthrow in 2024. Following Assad's fall, Ahmed al-Sharaa, commander of Hay'at Tahrir al-Sham and head of the new Syrian administration, assumed the de facto role of head of state until he was officially appointed president by the Syrian General Command during the Syrian Revolution Victory Conference in January 2025.

== List of officeholders ==
=== Syria (1922–1958) ===
No.	Portrait	Name (Birth–Death)	Elected	Term of office			Political party	Note(s)
No.	Portrait	Name (Birth–Death)	Elected	Took office	Left office	Time in office	Political party	Note(s)
French mandate (1922–1930)
Syrian Federation (1922–1925)
Position not established (28 June 1922 – 29 June 1922)
1		Subhi Bey Barakat صبحي بك بركات (1889–1939)	—	29 June 1922	1 January 1925	2 years, 185 days	Independent	
State of Syria (1925–1930)
(1)		Subhi Bey Barakat صبحي بك بركات (1889–1939)	—	1 January 1925	21 December 1925	354 days	Independent	
Vacant (21 December 1925 – 9 February 1926)
—		François Pierre-Alype فرانسوا بيير أليب (1886–1956) acting	—	9 February 1926	28 April 1926	78 days	Independent	Acting President as Envoy Extraordinary of the High Commissioner.
2		Ahmad Nami أحمد نامي (1873–1962)	—	28 April 1926	15 February 1928	1 year, 293 days	Independent	
—		Taj al-Din al-Hasani تاج الدين الحسني (1885–1943) acting	—	15 February 1928	14 May 1930	2 years, 88 days	Independent	
First Syrian Republic (1930–1950)
Mandatory Syrian Republic (1930–1946)
—		Taj al-Din al-Hasani تاج الدين الحسني (1885–1943) acting	—	14 May 1930	19 November 1931	1 year, 189 days	Independent	
—		Léon Solomiac ليون سولومياك (1873–1960) acting	—	19 November 1931	11 June 1932	205 days	Independent	Acting President as High Commissioner.
3		Muhammad Ali Bey al-Abid محمد علي بك العابد (1867–1939)	1932	11 June 1932	21 December 1936	4 years, 193 days	Independent	
4		Hashim al-Atassi هاشم الأتاسي (1875–1960)	1936	21 December 1936	7 July 1939	2 years, 198 days	National Bloc	
5		Bahij al-Khatib بهيج الخطيب (1895–1981)	—	8 July 1939	4 April 1941	1 year, 270 days	Independent	
—		Khalid al-Azm خالد العظم (1903–1965) acting	—	4 April 1941	16 September 1941	165 days	Independent	
6		Taj al-Din al-Hasani تاج الدين الحسني (1885–1943)	—	16 September 1941	17 January 1943	1 year, 123 days	Independent	Hasani died in office.
—		Jamil al-Ulshi جميل الألشي (1883–1951) acting	—	17 January 1943	25 March 1943	67 days	Independent	
7		Ata Bey al-Ayyubi عطا الأيوبي (1877–1951)	—	25 March 1943	17 August 1943	145 days	Independent	
8		Shukri al-Quwatli شكري القوّتلي (1891–1967)	1943	17 August 1943	17 April 1946	2 years, 68 days	National Bloc	
Independent First Syrian Republic (1946–1950)
(8)		Shukri al-Quwatli شكري القوّتلي (1891–1967)	1948	17 April 1946	30 March 1949	3 years, 157 days	National Bloc	Quwatli was ousted from power in the March 1949 coup d'état by Husni al-Za'im, his chief of staff.
(8)		Shukri al-Quwatli شكري القوّتلي (1891–1967)	1948	17 April 1946	30 March 1949	3 years, 157 days	National Party	Quwatli was ousted from power in the March 1949 coup d'état by Husni al-Za'im, his chief of staff.
Vacant (30 March 1949 – 26 June 1949)
9		Husni al-Za'im حسني الزعيم (1897–1949)	1949 (Jun.)	26 June 1949	14 August 1949	49 days	Independent (SSNP–affiliated)	Za'im was from 30 March 1949 – 26 June 1949 de facto leader as Commander-in-Chief of the Army and Armed Forces. He was overthrown in the August 1949 coup d'état led by Adib Shishakli, and was later executed on the orders of the new government.
—		Sami al-Hinnawi سامي الحناوي (1898–1950) acting	—	14 August 1949	15 August 1949	1 day	Military (SSNP)	Acting President as Commander-in-Chief of the Army and Armed Forces.
Vacant (15 August 1949 – 19 December 1949)
(4)		Hashim al-Atassi هاشم الأتاسي (1875–1960)	1949 (Dec.)	19 December 1949	5 September 1950	260 days	People's Party	Head of State. During this period, Hinnawi served as the country's de facto leader (as Chairman of the Supreme Council of War) until his overthrow in the December 1949 coup d'état, led by Shishakli, who then became de facto leader as head of the Council of Colonels (later the Supreme Military Council).
Second Syrian Republic (1950–1958)
(4)		Hashim al-Atassi هاشم الأتاسي (1875–1960)	1950	5 September 1950	2 December 1951	1 year, 88 days	People's Party	Atassi resigned in the aftermath of the 1951 coup d'état.
—		Adib Shishakli أديب الشيشكلي (1909–1964) acting	—	2 December 1951	3 December 1951	1 day	Syrian Social Nationalist Party	Acting President as Chief of the General Staff and head of the Supreme Military Council.
10		Fawzi Selu فوزي سلو (1905–1972)	—	3 December 1951	11 July 1953	1 year, 220 days	Military (ALM–affiliated)	After the coup the Army Command Council announced that it was collectively assuming responsibility for government, entrusted Selu with all executive and legislative powers, and dissolved the parliament. Shishakli assumed supreme command in the country and took the office of deputy chief of staff.
11		Adib Shishakli أديب الشيشكلي (1909–1964)	1953	11 July 1953	25 February 1954	229 days	Arab Liberation Movement	Shishakli resigned from office on 25 February or on the evening of 26 February 1954, amidst a coup d'état. He fled the country, claiming that he did not want Syria to fall into a civil war.
—		Maamun al-Kuzbari مأمون الكزبري (1914–1998) acting	—	25 February 1954	28 February 1954	3 days	Arab Liberation Movement	
(4)		Hashim al-Atassi هاشم الأتاسي (1875–1960)	—	28 February 1954	6 September 1955	1 year, 190 days	People's Party	
(8)		Shukri al-Quwatli شكري القوّتلي (1891–1967)	1955	6 September 1955	22 February 1958	2 years, 169 days	National Party	

=== United Arab Republic (1958–1961) ===
No.	Portrait	Name (Birth–Death)	Elected	Term of office			Political party
No.	Portrait	Name (Birth–Death)	Elected	Took office	Left office	Time in office	Political party
United Arab Republic (1958–1961)
12		Gamal Abdel Nasser جمال عبد الناصر (1918–1970)	1958	22 February 1958	28 September 1961	3 years, 218 days	National Union

=== Syria (1961–1963) ===
No.	Portrait	Name (Birth–Death)	Elected	Term of office			Political party	Note(s)
No.	Portrait	Name (Birth–Death)	Elected	Took office	Left office	Time in office	Political party	Note(s)
Syrian Arab Republic (1961–1963)
Vacant; military junta rule (28 September 1961 – 29 September 1961)
—		Maamun al-Kuzbari مأمون الكزبري (1914–1998) acting	—	29 September 1961	20 November 1961	52 days	Independent	
Vacant; military junta rule (20 November 1961 – 14 December 1961)
13		Nazim al-Qudsi ناظم القدسي (1906–1998)	1961	14 December 1961	28 March 1962	104 days	People's Party	Qudsi was the last democratically elected President of Syria, taking office on 14 December 1961. He resigned on 28 March 1962 but returned to office on 2 April after the 1962 coup attempt failed.
Vacant; military junta rule (28 March 1962 – 2 April 1962)
(13)		Nazim al-Qudsi ناظم القدسي (1906–1998)	–	2 April 1962	8 March 1963	340 days	People's Party	The 1963 coup d'état, an event known as the March 8 Revolution, toppled Qudsi and brought the National Council for the Revolutionary Command (NCRC) to government, although real power lay with the Ba'athist Military Committee, which organized the coup.

=== Ba'athist Syria (1963–2024) ===
No.	Portrait	Name (Birth–Death)	Elected	Term of office			Political party	Note(s)
No.	Portrait	Name (Birth–Death)	Elected	Took office	Left office	Time in office	Political party	Note(s)
Syrian Arab Republic (1963–2024)
Vacant (8 March 1963 – 9 March 1963)
14		Lu'ay al-Atassi لؤي الأتاسي (1926–2003)	—	9 March 1963	27 July 1963	140 days	Independent	Atassi was appointed president by the NCRC because he posed no threat to the Military Committee's power. He resigned after high-ranking non-Ba'athist officers were purged. (Note: During Atassi's tenure, the office of head of state was entitled President of the National Council for the Revolutionary Command.)
15		Amin al-Hafiz أمين الحافظ (1921–2009)	—	27 July 1963	23 February 1966	2 years, 211 days	Ba'ath Party (Syria Region)	Hafiz was overthrown by the Military Committee because of his support for Michel Aflaq and the Ba'athist National Command. (Note: During Hafiz's tenure, the office of head of state was entitled President of the National Council for the Revolutionary Command, and later as President of the Presidential Council.)
Vacant (23 February 1966 – 25 February 1966)
16		Nureddin al-Atassi نور الدين الأتاسي (1929–1992)	—	25 February 1966	18 November 1970	4 years, 266 days	Syrian Ba'ath Party (Syria Region)	Atassi was overthrown when a falling out occurred between Salah Jadid, the country's de facto leader from 1966 to 1970 as Assistant Regional Secretary of the Regional Command, and Hafez al-Assad, the Minister of Defense. Assad initiated a coup in 1970, known as the Corrective Movement.
—		Ahmad al-Khatib أحمد الخطيب (1933–1982) acting	—	18 November 1970	12 March 1971	114 days	Syrian Ba'ath Party (Syria Region)	Assad served as the country's de facto leader during this period, as head of the Temporary Regional Command and as Regional Secretary of the Regional Command; and from 22 February 1971 onwards additionally as Deputy Commander-in-Chief of the Army and Armed Forces.
17		Hafez al-Assad حافظ الأسد (1930–2000)	1971; 1978; 1985; 1991; 1999	12 March 1971	10 June 2000	29 years, 90 days	Syrian Ba'ath Party (Syria Region)	In late 1983, due to deteriorating health, Assad transferred his powers during his absence and recovery to a committee consisting of members from his close circle. (Note: The committee consisted of Rifaat al-Assad (younger brother of Assad), Abdul Halim Khaddam (Minister of Foreign Affairs), Mustafa Tlass (Minister of Defense), Hikmat al-Shihabi (Chief of the General Staff), Ali Duba (Director of the Military Intelligence Directorate), Abdullah al-Ahmar (National Ba'ath Party official), Zuhair Masharqa (Regional Ba'ath Party official) and Abdul Rauf al-Kasm (Prime Minister).) Assad recovered and died in office seventeen years later.
—		Abdul Halim Khaddam عبدالحليم خدام (1932–2020) acting	—	10 June 2000	17 July 2000	37 days	Syrian Ba'ath Party (Syria Region)	Khaddam constitutionally succeeded from the vice presidency, and served on an acting basis until the new confirmative referendum.
18		Bashar al-Assad بَشَّارُ ٱلْأَسَدِ (born 1965)	2000; 2007; 2014; 2021	17 July 2000	8 December 2024	24 years, 144 days	Syrian Ba'ath Party (Syria Region)	Assad was overthrown during the fall of Damascus in the Syrian civil war, and fled the country to Russia.

=== Transitional period (2024–present) ===
No.	Portrait	Name (Birth–Death)	Elected	Term of office			Political party	Note(s)
No.	Portrait	Name (Birth–Death)	Elected	Took office	Left office	Time in office	Political party	Note(s)
Syrian Arab Republic (2024–present)
Vacant (8 December 2024 – 29 January 2025) (Note: Following the fall of the Assad regime, Ahmed al-Sharaa served as Syria's de facto leader as the emir of Hay'at Tahrir al-Sham, general commander, and head of the new Syrian administration until 29 January 2025, when he was appointed President of Syria by the Syrian General Command.)
19		Ahmed al-Sharaa أحمد الشرع (born 1982)	—	29 January 2025	Incumbent	1 year, 264 days	Independent	Al-Sharaa was appointed as president by the Syrian General Command during the transitional period at the Syrian Revolution Victory Conference.

== See also ==
- President of Syria
- List of heads of state of Syria
- Vice President of Syria
- Prime Minister of Syria
  - List of prime ministers of Syria
- Speaker of the People's Assembly of Syria
