= 1932 Syrian presidential election =

- 11 June 1932
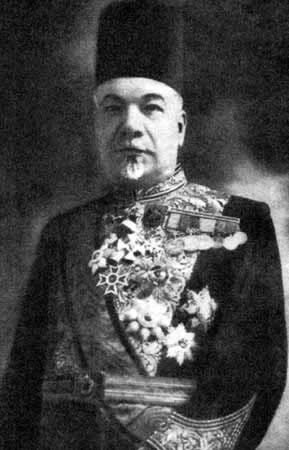

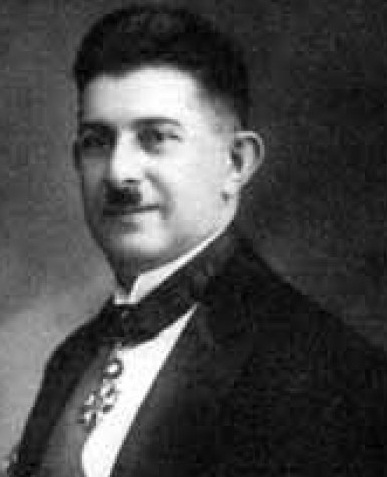
Candidate	Muhammad Ali al-Abid	Subhi Barakat
Party	Independent	Independent
Electoral vote	36 (2nd round)	32 (2nd round)
Percentage	52.9%	47.1%
President before election
(office established)
Elected President
Muhammad Ali al-Abid
Independent

The 1932 Syrian presidential election was held on 11 June 1932, when the Syrian Chamber of Deputies elected Muhammad Ali al-Abid as the first President of the Syrian Republic. Under the Constitution of 1930, the president was to be chosen by parliament rather than by direct popular vote. The election took place several days after the chamber's inaugural session on 7 June 1932, which had followed the 1931–1932 Syrian parliamentary election.

== Background ==
The 1931–1932 Syrian parliamentary election had returned 68 deputies, of whom 17 belonged to the National Bloc under Hashim al-Atassi. As in the 1928 elections, the nationalists did not command a majority in the chamber. Yet, as had also been the case in 1928, their influence proved considerable and exceeded what their numbers alone would suggest. They remained the driving force behind the legislative assembly.

== Candidates ==
Four candidates stood for the presidency:

- Subhi Barakat: the newly elected speaker; former president of the Syrian Federation and the State of Syria; a prominent figure from Antioch with openly pro-French sympathies.
- Haqqi al-Azm: former president of the State of Damascus between 1920 and 1922; known for his pro-French stance.
- Muhammad Ali al-Abid: scion of a wealthy Damascene family with close ties to Sultan Abdul Hamid II; former ambassador of the Ottoman Sublime Porte to the United States in 1908; regarded as a moderate independent.
- Hashim al-Atassi: former president of the Syrian National Congress, Prime Minister under King Faisal, and president of the Constituent Assembly in 1928; the National Bloc's preferred candidate.

== Conduct and result ==
The National Bloc did not have sufficient numbers in the chamber to guarantee the election of its own candidate, Hashim al-Atassi. After the first round of voting — in which Atassi received 17 votes — Atassi withdrew from the contest. The nationalists then threw their support behind Muhammad Ali al-Abid, the moderate independent candidate, with the express purpose of preventing either Haqqi al-Azm or Subhi Barakat — both openly pro-French — from acceding to the presidency.

Muhammad Ali al-Abid was elected first President of the Syrian Republic on 11 June 1932, receiving 36 votes against Barakat's 32. He held office until 21 December 1936.

The election of Muhammad Ali al-Abid was seen as a further failure for High Commissioner Henri Ponsot, compounding his earlier inability to secure the adoption of a constitution favourable to the mandatory authority in 1928.
