= List of Syrian presidential firsts =

The following lists achievements and distinctions of various presidents of Syria. It includes distinctions achieved in their earlier life and presidencies. The order in this list and the listed distinctions exclude acting presidents and presidents of the United Arab Republic.

== Subhi Bey Barakat (1922–1925) ==
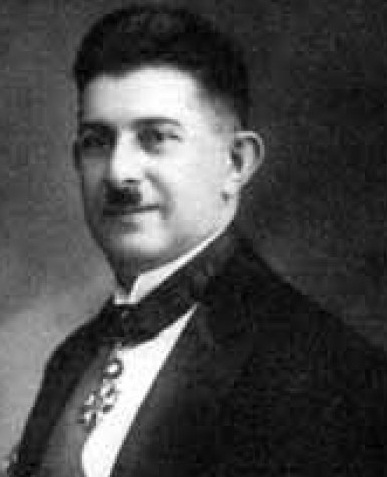
Subhi Bey Barakat (c. 1922)

- First president of Syria
- First president of Syria under French mandate
- First president of the Syrian Federation (Note: Barakat was the only president of the Syrian Federation.)
- First president of the State of Syria
- First president to be democratically elected by parliament
- First president to serve as Prime Minister, concurrent with his tenure as President
- First president to have an assassination attempt made on his life
- First president to murder someone (Note: Barakat killed his would-be assassin while resisting him during the attempt on his life.)
- First president to murder someone while in office
- First president to resign the presidency
- First president to run for presidency again after he left it
- First president to not be re-elected after running for presidency
- First president to have been a member of the General Assembly of the Ottoman Empire prior to becoming president
- First president to be elected to parliament after leaving the presidency
- First president to serve as speaker of parliament after leaving the presidency
- First president to be elected to a foreign parliament after leaving the presidency
- First president to be a member of the parliament of Hatay State after leaving the presidency
- First president to be an independent
- First president to hold a foreign citizenship
- First president to hold Turkish citizenship
- First president to be photographed
- First president to have facial hair
- Firat president born in Asia
- First president born in the 19th century
- First president born in what is today not Syrian territory (Note: Barakat was born in Antakya, now in Turkey's Hatay Province.)
- First president born in the Ottoman Empire
- First president born in what later became Turkey (Note: Though Barakat's family comes originally from Hama.)
- First president of Turkmen ethnicity
- First president to be Sunni Muslim
- First president to have Turkish as his mother tongue, and not be fluent in Arabic
- First president to be unmarried when assuming office
- First president to be married while in office
- First president to he married to a Syrian woman
- First president to be divorced
- First president to be divorced while in office
- First president to remarry, and to marry twice while in office
- First president to be married to a non-Syrian woman
- First president to be married to a Turkish citizen
- First president to have children
- First president to die in Turkey (Note: Barakat died in Antakya in Turkey's Hatay Province. At the time, Much of Hatay was claimed by Syria as the Sanjak of Alexandretta.)
- First president to die in his city of birth

== Ahmad Nami (1926–1929) ==
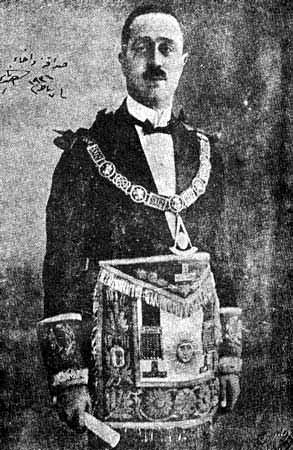
Nami in 1925

- First president born in what later became Lebanon (Note: Nami's family had settled in Syria from the Caucasus in the late 18th century.)
- First president of Circassian ethnicity (Note: Nami was of Turkish and Circassian origin.)
- First president to study in a military academy (Note: Nami attended the Ottoman Military Academy.)
- First president to be formerly married to a princess and be a prince (Damat) by marriage
- First president to be divorced prior to assuming office
- First president to not be married at anytime while in office
- First president to be a Freemason
- First president to die in Lebanon
- First president to die outside of Syria in lands not claimed by Syria (Note: President Subhi Bey Barakat died in Antakya in Turkey's Hatay Province. At the time, Much of Hatay was claimed by Syria as the Sanjak of Alexandretta)

== Muhammad Ali Bey al-Abid (1932–1936) ==
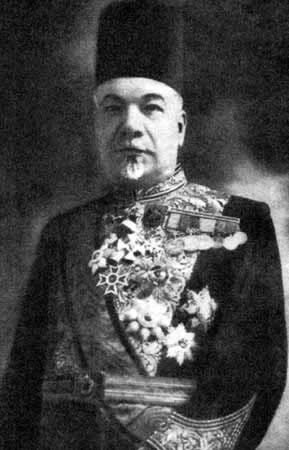
Al-Abid in 1932

- First president of the Syrian Republic
- First president of the First Syrian Republic
- First president to not simultaneously serve as Prime Minister
- First president to be a member of a political party
- First president to be a member of the National Bloc
- First president to have previously served as a government minister
- First president to have previously served as Minister of Finance
- First president to have previously served as a Member of Parliament
- First President to have previously served as a diplomat in the Ottoman Empire (Note: Al-Abid served as the Ottoman Empire's ambassador to the United States.)
- First president to be a millionaire
- First president to appear on a Syrian postal stamp
- First president to be related to a former president by marriage only prior to assuming presidency (Note: Al-Abid was President Subhi Barakat's father-in-law; that relation was ended by Barakat divorcing al-Abid's daughter before al-Abid assumed the presidency.)
- First president born in what is today Syrian territory
- First president born in Damascus
- First president of Arab ethnicity
- First president to not be from an ethnic minority in Syria
- First president to be a native and fluent Arabic speaker
- First president to die in Italy
- First president to not die in his city of birth
- First president to be buried in Syria

== Hashim al-Atassi (1936–1939, 1950–1951, 1954–1955) ==
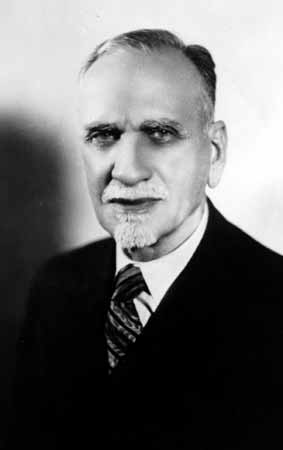
Hashim al-Atassi

- First president to serve more than one consecutive period
- First president to serve three non-consecutive periods (Note: So far, al-Atassi is the only president to serve three non-consecutive periods.)
- First president of the Second Syrian Republic
- First president to have served as Prime Minister of the Arab Kingdom of Syria (Note: Al-Attasi is the only president to have served as Prime Minister under the Arab Kingdom of Syria.)
- First president to have previously served as the President of the Constituent Assembly (Note: Today referred to as Speaker of the People's Assembly.)
- First president to be a member of two different political parties (Note: National Bloc (1928-1947) and People's Party (1948-1960).)
- First president from the People's Party
- First president to be born in Homs
- First president to die in Syria under the United Arab Republic (Note: Al-Atassi is the only president to die during the time Syria was part of the United Arab Republic.)

== Bahij al-Khatib (1939–1941) ==
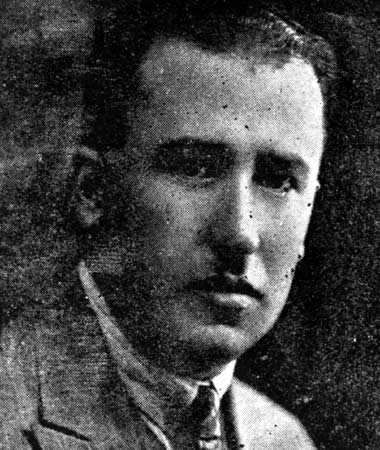
Bahij al-Khatib

- First president to not be born in a city, and to be born in a village
- First president to have served as Governor of Damascus
- First president to serve as a government minister after his presidency
- First president to serve as a Governor after his presidency
- First president to serve as Governor of Damascus after leaving office
- First president to serve as Governor of Suwayda after leaving office

== Taj al-Din al-Hasani (1941–1943) ==
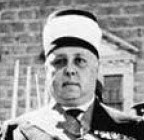
Taj al-Din al-Hasani

- First president to have previously served as acting president
- First president to have previously served as Minister of Interior
- First president to die in office
- First president to die in Syria (Note: Though at the time, Syria was still under French Mandate.)

== Ata Bey al-Ayyubi (1943) ==
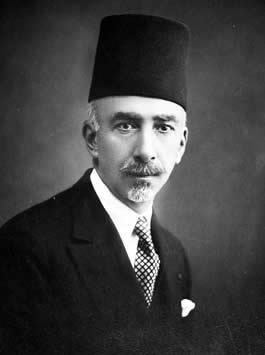
Ata Bey al-Ayyubi

- First president to serve for less than one year

== Shukri al-Quwatli (1943–1949, 1955–1958) ==
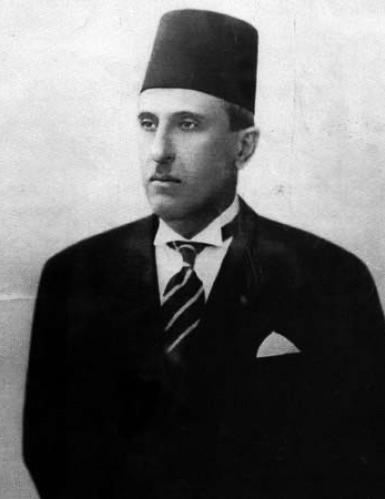
Al-Quwatli in 1943

- First president post-independence from French mandate
- First president to be a member of the National Party
- First president to be sentenced to death (by French authorities in Syria) (Note: Al-Quwatli was later pardoned by French authorities.)
- First president known to have attempted suicide prior to assuming office
- First president to be ousted by a coup d'état

== Husni al-Za'im (1949) ==
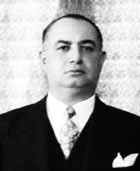
Husni al-Za'im (c. 1949)

- First president to assume power following a coup d'état
- First president to be a military ruler
- First president to be a WWI veteran
- First president born in Aleppo
- First president of Kurdish ethnicity
- First president to die in post-independence Syria

== Fawzi Selu (1951–1953) ==
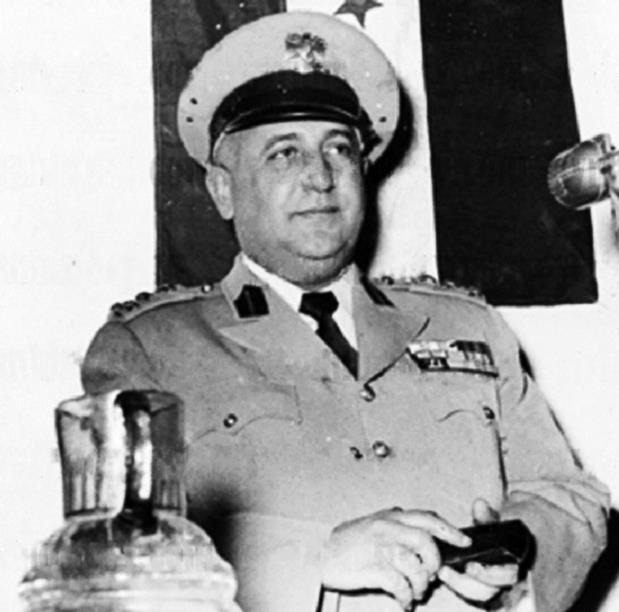
Fawzi Selu

- First president to have served as a Minister of Defense
- First president to be born in the 20th century

== Adib Shishakli (1953–1954) ==
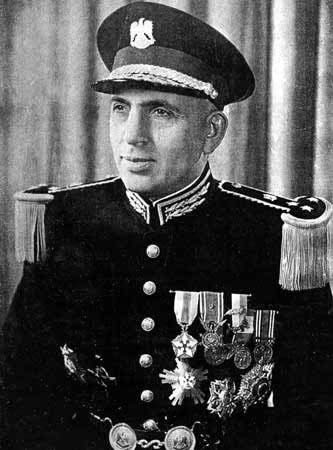
Shishakli in the 1950s

- First president to be a formal member of the Syrian Social Nationalist Party (Note: President Husni al-Za'im was affiliated with the party, though he not a member.)
- First president to bombard civilian areas
- First president born in Hama
- First president to be assassinated (after leaving office)
- First president to die in Brazil

== Nazim al-Qudsi (1961–1963) ==
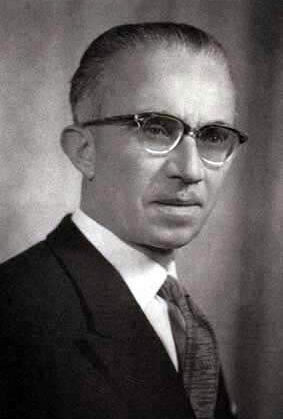
Nazim al-Qudsi

- First president after Syria's secession from the United Arab Republic
- First president to have previously served as Syrian Ambassador to the United States
- First president to die in Jordan

== Lu'ay al-Atassi (1963) ==
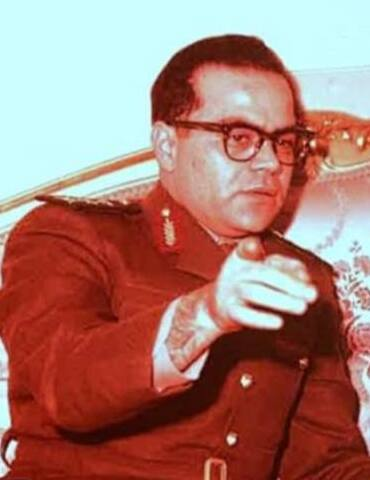
Al-Atassi in 1963

- First president in the Ba'athist era of Syria
- First president to be related to a former president

== Amin al-Hafiz (1963–1966) ==
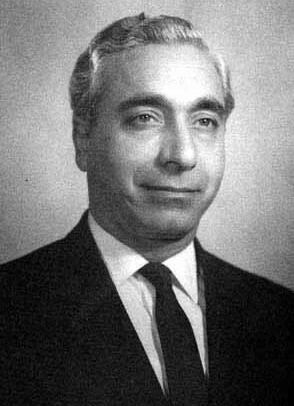
Amin al-Hafiz (c. 1960s)

- First president to be a member of the Ba'ath party

== Nureddin al-Atassi (1966–1970) ==
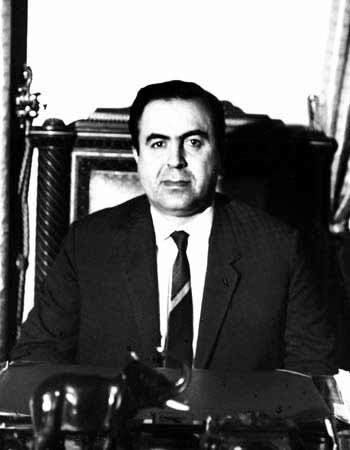
Al-Atassi in 1970

- First president to die in France

== Hafez al-Assad (1970–2000) ==
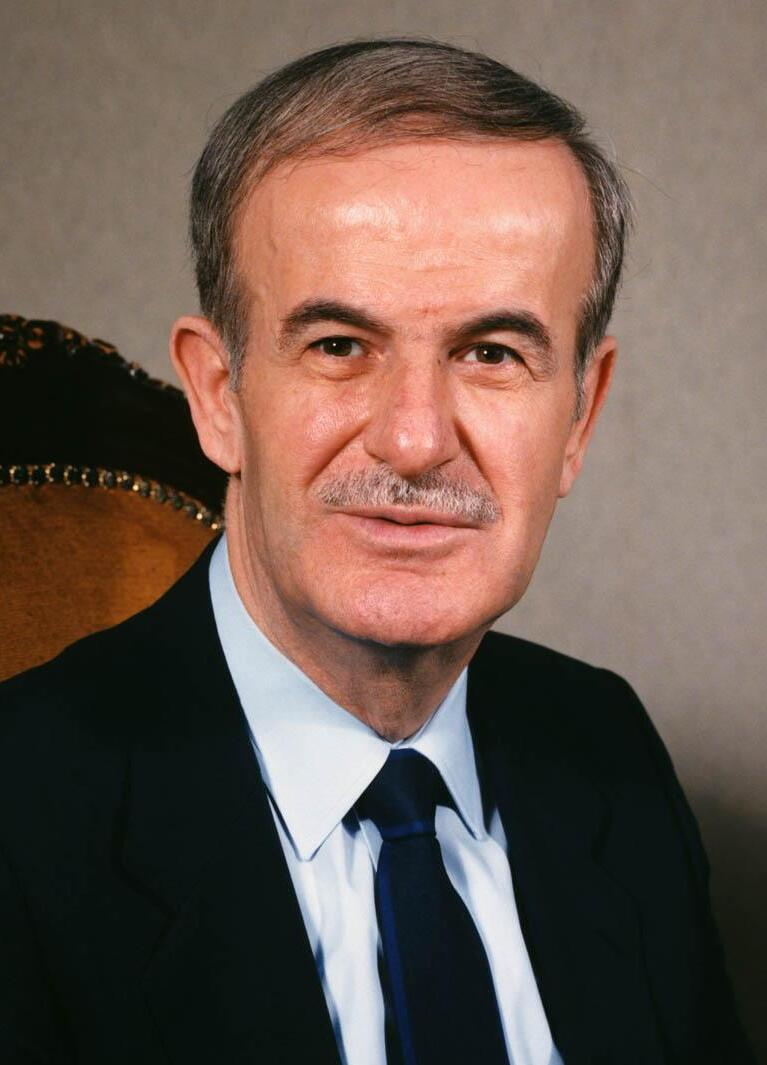
Al-Assad in 1986

- First president in the 21st century
- First president to rule for more than ten years
- First president to rule for more than twenty years
- First president born in Qardaha
- First president to be non-Sunni
- First president to be Alawite
- First president to have a non-Sunni wife
- First president to have an Alawite wife
- First president to have been an air force pilot prior to his presidency
- First president to lead an intervention to occupy territory of another nation
- First president to appear on Syrian currency
- First president to reside in the People's Palace
- First president to die in the 21st century

== Bashar al-Assad (2000–2024) ==
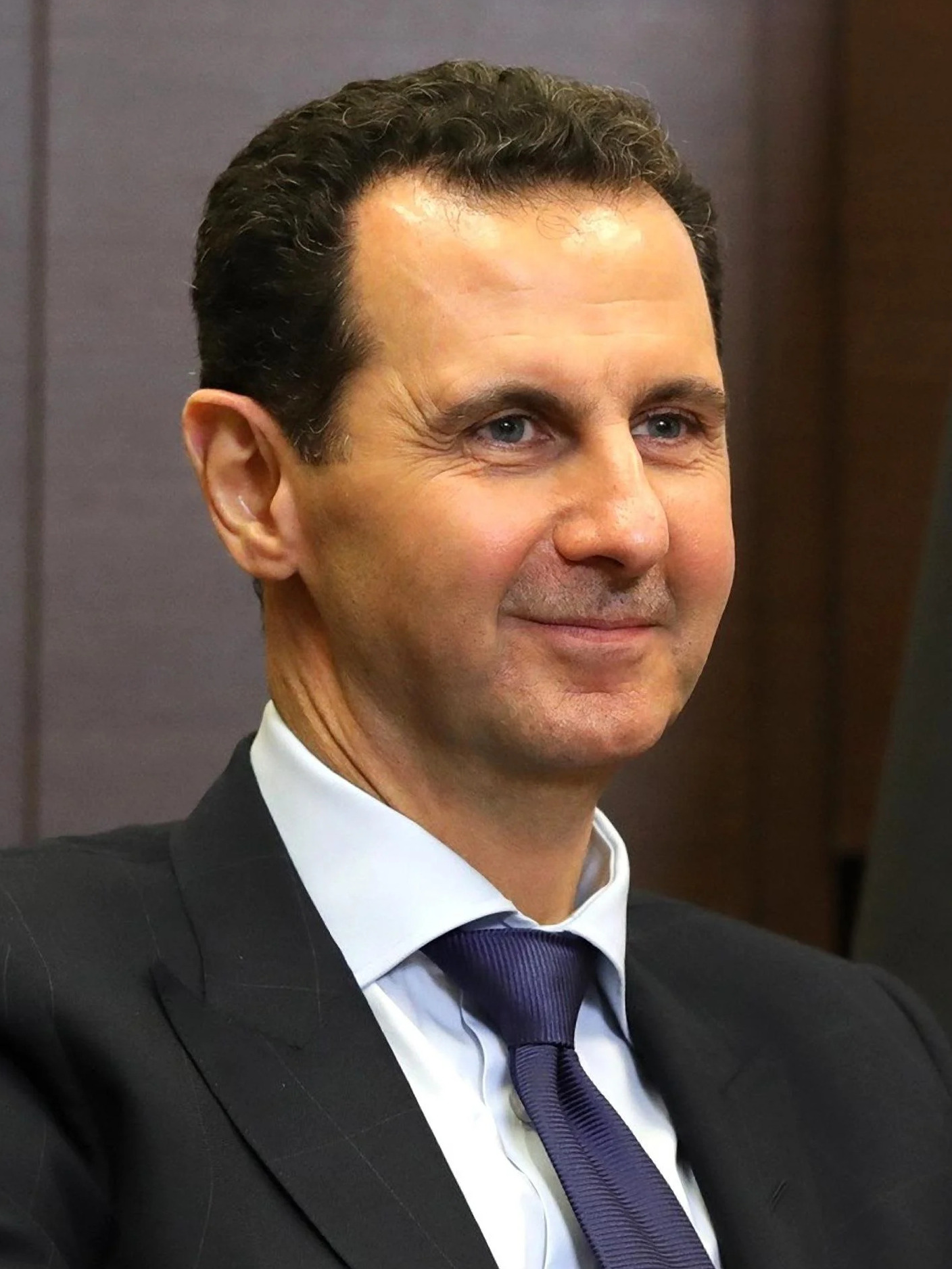
Al-Assad in 2018

- First president to be the son of a former president
- First president to directly succeed his relative as president
- First president to directly succeed his father as president
- First president to be an ophthalmologist
- First president to have a woman as vice president (Note: Al-Assad was the first Arab president to have a woman vice president.)
- First president to bombard civilian areas with chemical weapons
- First president to be ousted following a popular revolution and insurgency, not regular legal process or a coup d'état
- First president to be granted humanitarian asylum in another nation
- First president to be married to a British citizen
- First president to have a wife from a different religious sect than his
- First president to be alive at a time when no former president was alive

== Ahmed al-Sharaa (2025–present) ==
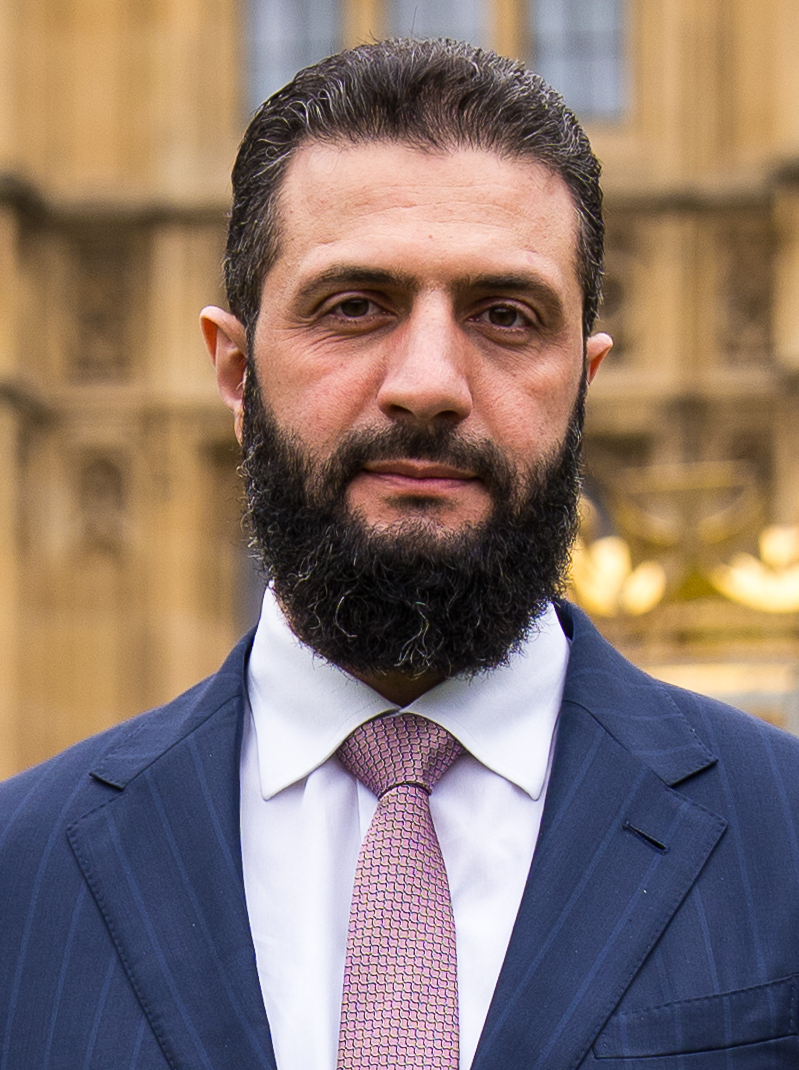
Al-Sharaa in 2026

- First president following the end of Syria's Ba'athist era
- First president to have a Nom de guerre
- First president to be a Jihadi
- First president to have fought in the Iraq War
- First president to have been a POW
- First president to be a member of a terrorist organization
- First president to be designated as terrorist prior to and, for a while, during his presidency
- First president to be wanted by the United States through the Rewards for Justice Program
- First president to have origins from the Golan Heights area
- First president born in Saudi Arabia
- First president born outside of the Levant
- First sitting Syrian president to visit the White House and the Oval Office
- First president to visit Arwad, Syria's only inhabited island

== See also ==
- List of presidents of Syria
