= List of heads of state of Syria =

This is a list of heads of state of Syria since 1920.

== Military administrators ==
=== OETA South chief administrators ===
The area was divided into four districts: Jerusalem, Jaffa, Majdal and Beersheba, each under a military governor. Both of the first two British administrators, Generals Money and Watson, were removed by London for not favouring the Zionists over the Arabs; when the OETA administration ended, Liberal party politician (and former British Home Secretary) Herbert Samuel was installed as the first civilian administrator. Samuel recorded his acceptance of the role, and the end of military administration, in an often-quoted document: "Received from Major-General Sir Louis J. Bols K.C.B.—One Palestine, complete."

No.	Portrait	Name (birth–death)	Term of office			Ref.
No.	Portrait	Name (birth–death)	Took office	Left office	Time in office	Ref.
1		Major General; Arthur Wigram Money (1866–1951)	June 1918	June 1919	1 year	
2		Major General; Harry Davis Watson (1866–1945)	June 1919	December 1919	6 months	
3		Lieutenant General; Louis Bols (1867–1930)	January 1920	July 1920	6 months	

=== OETA East administrators ===
OETA East was a joint Arab-British military administration. The Arab and British armies entered Damascus on 1 October 1918, and on 3 October 1918 Ali Rida al-Rikabi was appointed Military Governor of OETA East. Prince Faisal son of King Hussain of Mecca entered Damascus as on 4 October and appointed Rikabi Chief of the Council of Directors (i.e. prime minister) of Syria.

The boundary definition of OETA East left uncertainties to the south and east, leading to competing claims from the Kingdom of Hejaz and Occupied Iraq respectively – see Occupation of Ma'an and Occupation of Zor for further details.

- Rida al-Rikabi (3 October 1918 – 26 November 1919)

=== OETA North (West) administrators ===
- Marie Antoine de Piépape (7 October 1918 – 19 November 1918)
- Jules Camille Hamelin (19 November 1918 – 21 November 1919)
- François Georges Barb (21 November 1919 – 1 September 1920)

=== OETA North (Cilicia) administrators ===
- Édouard Brémond

== High Commissioners of France in the Levant ==
- Syria or French Syria (1920–1946) (French Mandate of Syria)

Portrait	Name	Term of office			Notes
Portrait	Name	Took office	Left office	Time in office	Notes
	Henri Gouraud	9 October 1919	23 November 1922	3 years, 45 days	
	Robert de Caix	23 November 1922	19 April 1923	147 days	Acting
	Maxime Weygand	19 April 1923	29 November 1924	1 year, 224 days	
	Maurice Sarrail	29 November 1924	23 December 1925	1 year, 24 days	
	Henry de Jouvenel	23 December 1925	23 June 1926	182 days	
	Henri Ponsot	August 1926	13 July 1933	6 years, 11 months	
	Damien de Martel	16 July 1933	January 1939	5 years, 5 months	
	Gabriel Puaux	January 1939	November 1940	1 year, 10 months	
	Jean Chiappe	24 November 1940	27 November 1940	3 days	Died on flight to take office.
	Henri Dentz	6 December 1940	14 July 1941	220 days	Dentz was repatriated to Metropolitan France following the Armistice of Saint Jean d'Acre.

== General Delegates of Free France in the Levant ==
Portrait	Name	Term of office			Notes
Portrait	Name	Took office	Left office	Time in office	Notes
	Georges Catroux	24 June 1941	7 June 1943	1 year, 348 days	Catroux was also Chief of Free French Forces in Levant states.
	Jean Helleu	7 June 1943	23 November 1943	169 days	
	Yves Chataigneau	23 November 1943	23 January 1944	61 days	
	Paul Beynet	23 January 1944	1 September 1946	2 years, 221 days	

== Governors of Jabal Druze State ==
- Amir Salim Pasha al-Atrash (1 May 1921 – 15 September 1923)
- Trenga (provisional) (September 1923 – 6 March 1924)
- Gabriel Marie Victor Carbillet (6 March 1924 – 14 October 1925), provisional to 1 October 1924
- Sultan Pasha al-Atrash (18 July 1925 – 1 June 1927), chief of state; in dissidence
- Charles Andréa (15 October 1925 – 1927)
- Marie Joseph Léon Augustin Henry (1927)
- Abel Jean Ernest Clément-Grancourt (1927–1932)
- Claude-Gabriel-Renaud Massiet (3 February 1932 – 28 January 1934)
- Justin-Antoine Devicq (1934–1935)
- Pierre-Joseph-François Tarrit (1935 – 2 December 1936)

== Governors of Hatay State ==
Hatay State (Turkish: Hatay Devleti; French: État du Hatay; Arabic: دولة حطاي, romanized: Dawlat Ḥaṭāy), also known informally as the Republic of Hatay (Arabic: جمهورية حطاي, romanized: Jumhūriyyat Ḥaṭāy), was a transitional political entity that existed from 7 September 1938 to 29 June 1939, being located in the territory of the Sanjak of Alexandretta of the French Mandate of Syria. The state was transformed de facto into the Hatay Province of Turkey on 7 July 1939, de jure joining the country on 23 July 1939.

== Governors of Alawite State ==
The Alawite State was run by a succession of French governors from 1920 to 1936:

- 2 September 1920 – 1921: Colonel Marie Joseph Émile Niéger (b. 1874; d. 1951)
- 1921–1922: Gaston Henri Gustave Billotte (b. 1875; d. 1940)
- 1922–1925: Léon Henri Charles Cayla (b. 1881; d. 1965)
- 1925 – 5 December 1936: Ernest Marie Hubert Schoeffler (b. 1877; d. 1952)

The Sunni landowners, primarily living in the province's cities, were supporters of Syrian unity; however, the French were supported by the rural Alawite communities to whom they catered.

In 1930 the Alawite State was renamed as the Government of Latakia, the only concession by the French to Arab nationalists until 1936.

== Heads of state of Syria ==
Name	Portrait	Took office	Left office	Party	Position	
Occupied Enemy Territory Administration (1918–1920)						
Muhammad Said al-Jazairi محمد سعيد الجزائري		17 September 1918	30 September 1918		Head of Government	
Ali Rida Pasha al-Rikabi علي رضا باشا الركابي		30 September 1918	5 October 1918		Head of Government	
Faisal I فيصل الأول		5 October 1918	8 March 1920		Head of Government	
Arab Kingdom of Syria (1920)						
Faisal I فيصل الأول		8 March 1920	24 July 1920 (expelled)		King	
Ali Rida Pasha al-Rikabi علي رضا باشا الركابي		8 March 1920	3 May 1920		Prime Minister	
Hashim al-Atassi هاشم الأتاسي		3 May 1920	28 July 1920		Prime Minister	
Federation of the Autonomous States of Syria (1920–1924) (Part of the French Mandate of Syria and Lebanon)						Vice President of Syria
Subhi Bay Barakat al-Khalidi صبحي بك بركات الخالدي		28 June 1922	31 December 1924	Independent	President	
State of Syria (1925–1930) (Part of the French Mandate of Syria and Lebanon)						
Subhi Bay Barakat al-Khalidi صبحي بك بركات الخالدي		1 January 1925	21 December 1925	Independent	President	
François Pierre-Alype فرانسوا بيير أليب		9 February 1926	28 April 1926	Independent	Envoy Extraordinary of the High Commissioner Acting President	
Ahmad Nami أحمد نامي		28 April 1926	15 February 1928	Independent	President	
Taj al-Din al-Hasani تاج الدين الحسني		15 February 1928	14 May 1930	Independent	Prime Minister Acting President	
Syrian Republic (1930–1936) (Part of the French Mandate of Syria and Lebanon)						
Taj al-Din al-Hasani تاج الدين الحسني		14 May 1930	19 November 1931	Independent	Prime Minister Acting President	
Léon Solomiac ليون سولومياك		19 November 1931	11 June 1932	Independent	High Commissioner Acting President	
Muhammad Ali al-Abid محمد علي العابد		11 June 1932	27 September 1936	Independent	President	
Syrian Republic (1936–1946) (Franco-Syrian Treaty of Independence signed but not ratified)						
Muhammad Ali al-Abid محمد علي العابد		27 September 1936	21 December 1936	Independent	President	
Hashim al-Atassi هاسم الأتاسي (1st time)		21 December 1936	7 July 1939	National Bloc	President	
Bahij al-Khatib بيج الخطيب		10 July 1939	4 April 1941	Independent	President of the Council of Directors General	
Khalid al-Azm خالد العظم		4 April 1941	16 September 1941	Independent	Prime Minister Acting President	
Taj al-Din al-Hasani تاج الدين الحسني		16 September 1941	17 January 1943 (died in office)	Independent	President	
Jamil al-Ulshi جميل الألشي		17 January 1943	25 March 1943	Independent	Prime Minister Acting President	
Ata al-Ayyubi عطا الأيوبي		25 March 1943	17 August 1943	Independent	Prime Minister Acting President	
Shukri al-Quwatli شكري القوتلي (1st time)		17 August 1943	17 April 1946	National Bloc	President	
Syrian Republic (1946–1958)						
Shukri al-Quwatli شكري القوتلي (1st time)		17 April 1946	30 March 1949 (deposed)	National Bloc; National Party	President	
Husni al-Za'im حسني الزعيم		30 March 1949	26 June 1949	Military; Syrian Social Nationalist Party	Commander-in-Chief of the Army and Armed Forces	
Husni al-Za'im حسني الزعيم		26 June 1949	14 August 1949 (deposed)	Military; Syrian Social Nationalist Party	President	
Sami al-Hinnawi سامي الحناوي		14 August 1949	15 August 1949	Military	Commander-in-Chief of the Army and Armed Forces	
Hashim al-Atassi هاشم الأتاسي (2nd time)		15 August 1949	5 September 1950	People's Party	Head of State	
Hashim al-Atassi هاشم الأتاسي (2nd time)		5 September 1950	2 December 1951	People's Party	President	
Adib Shishakli أديب الشيشكلي		2 December 1951	3 December 1951	Military; Syrian Social Nationalist Party	Chairman of the General Staff President of the Supreme Military Council	
Fawzi Selu فوزي السلو		3 December 1951	11 July 1953	Military	Head of State	
Adib Shishakli أديب الشيشكلي		11 July 1953	25 February 1954 (deposed)	Military; Arab Liberation Movement	President	
Maamun al-Kuzbari مأمون الكزبري		26 February 1954	28 February 1954	Independent	Vice President Acting President	
Hashim al-Atassi هاشم الأتاسي (3rd time)		28 February 1954	6 September 1955	People's Party	President	
Shukri al-Quwatli شكري القوتلي (2nd time)		6 September 1955	22 February 1958	National Party	President	
United Arab Republic (1958–1961)						
Gamal Abdel Nasser جمال عبد الناصر		22 February 1958	29 September 1961	National Union	President	
Syrian Arab Republic (1961–1963)						
Maamun al-Kuzbari مأمون الكزبري		29 September 1961	20 November 1961	Independent	Prime Minister Acting President	
Izzat al-Nuss عزت النص		20 November 1961	14 December 1961	Independent	Prime Minister Acting President	
Nazim al-Kudsi ناظم القدسي		14 December 1961	8 March 1963 (deposed)	People's Party	President	
Syrian Arab Republic (1963–2024)						
Luai al-Atassi لؤي الأتاسي		9 March 1963	27 July 1963	Military; Ba'ath Party (Syria Region)	Presidents of the National Council for the Revolutionary Command	
Amin al-Hafiz أمين الحافظ		27 July 1963	13 May 1964	Military; Ba'ath Party (Syria Region)	Presidents of the National Council for the Revolutionary Command	
Amin al-Hafiz أمين الحافظ		13 May 1964	23 February 1966 (deposed)	Military; Ba'ath Party (Syria Region)	President of the Presidential Council	
Nureddin al-Atassi نور الدين الأتاسي		25 February 1966	18 November 1970 (deposed)	Military; Syrian Ba'ath Party (Syria Region)	Head of State	
Ahmad al-Khatib أحمد الخطيب		18 November 1970	12 March 1971	Syrian Ba'ath Party (Syria Region)	Acting Head of State	
Hafez al-Assad حافظ الأسد		12 March 1971	10 June 2000 (died in office)	Military; Syrian Ba'ath Party (Syria Region) (National Progressive Front)	President	
Abdul Halim Khaddam عبد الحليم خدام		10 June 2000	17 July 2000	Syrian Ba'ath Party (Syria Region) (National Progressive Front)	Vice President Acting President	
Bashar al-Assad بشار الأسد		17 July 2000	8 December 2024 (deposed)	Syrian Ba'ath Party (Syria Region) (National Progressive Front)	President	
Syrian Arab Republic (2024–present) (Transitional period)						
Ahmed al-Sharaa أحمد الشرع		8 December 2024	29 January 2025	Hay'at Tahrir al-Sham	De facto Leader	
Ahmed al-Sharaa أحمد الشرع		29 January 2025	Incumbent	Independent	President	

== See also ==
- List of presidents of Syria
- List of Vice Presidents of Syria
- List of Prime Ministers of Syria
- List of Presidents of Parliament of Syria
- List of foreign ministers of Syria
- President of Syria
- Vice President of Syria
- Prime Minister of Syria
- Speaker of the People's Assembly of Syria
