= 1943 Syrian presidential election =

- 17 August 1943
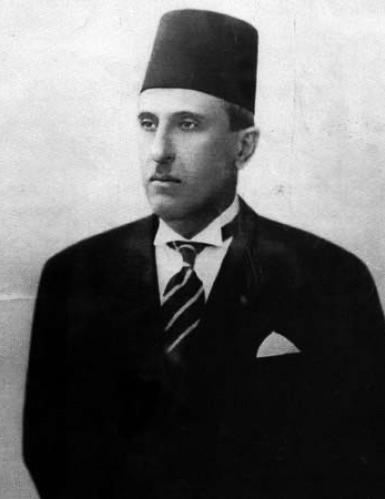
Candidate	Shukri al-Quwatli
Party	National Bloc
Electoral vote	121
Percentage	97.6%
President before election
Ata al-Ayyubi
Independent
Elected President
Shukri al-Quwatli
National Bloc

The 1943 Syrian presidential election was held on 17 August 1943, when the Syrian Chamber of Deputies elected Shukri al-Quwatli as President of the Syrian Republic by an overwhelming majority of 121 votes out of 124. The election followed the 1943 Syrian parliamentary election, in which the National Bloc had secured a majority of seats in the parliament. Under the Constitution of 1930, the president was elected by parliament rather than by direct popular vote.

== Background ==
The incumbent head of state, Sheikh Taj al-Din al-Hasani, died on 17 January 1943. His death intensified the Franco-British rivalry over Syria, with France keen to conclude a treaty with the Syrians whilst Britain supported the Syrian nationalist position of rejecting any treaty that would consolidate France's standing in Syria and Lebanon.

On 25 March 1943, General Georges Catroux issued a decree ending the mandate of the Jamil al-Ulshi government and appointed Ata al-Ayyubi as head of state and head of the transitional government charged with overseeing the elections. The Ayyubi government facilitated political parties, organisations, and groupings in launching their electoral campaigns.

Shukri al-Quwatli took an active role in securing a National Bloc majority in the Chamber of Deputies. On 9 May, accompanied by Faris al-Khoury, he visited former President Hashim al-Atassi in Homs, where an understanding was reached on al-Quwatli's candidacy for the presidency. Although it was a natural expectation that National Bloc president Hashim al-Atassi would assume the presidency, on the recommendation of other Bloc members he agreed to leave the highest office to Shukri al-Quwatli. Al-Quwatli subsequently visited Aleppo, holding extended meetings with leading figures there, though he was unable to secure their endorsement of his candidacy.

The campaign intensified following the announcement of the date for the elections. Hundreds of candidates' portraits appeared across the country — in newspapers, on street walls — alongside dozens of electoral programmes and verses of poetry.

The National Bloc's lists secured a majority of seats in the Chamber of Deputies.

== Election ==
On 17 August 1943, the 3rd Chamber of Deputies convened in the presence of the French representative in Syria, the British Minister, the American Minister, and representatives of the Arab states.

Al-Quwatli was elected President of the Syrian Republic with 121 votes out of 124.

== Al-Quwatli's inaugural address ==
After his election, al-Quwatli addressed the chamber, thanking the deputies for the confidence they had placed in him to lead the country at a time he described as one of grave events filling the pages of history. He referenced the Atlantic Charter and its recognition of the life and freedom of peoples, and praised the Allied nations fighting in defence of that freedom. He expressed gratitude to France in the person of General de Gaulle, who had proclaimed Syria's independence, and to Britain and the United States, which had recognised and helped bring about that independence. He extended warm greetings to the fraternal Arab states, represented by the consuls of Iraq, Egypt, and Saudi Arabia present in the chamber, and paid tribute to outgoing President Hashim al-Atassi, whom he described as having embodied the honour and dignity of Syria and the safeguarding of its rights during his presidency.
