= 1936 Syrian presidential election =

- 21 December 1936
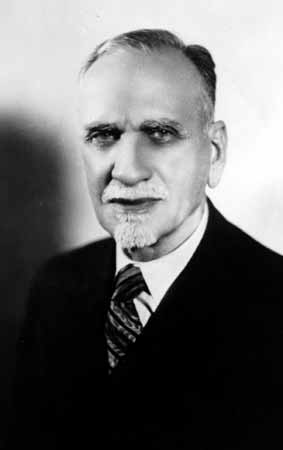
Candidate	Hashim al-Atassi
Party	National Bloc
Electoral vote	74
Percentage	90.2%
President before election
Muhammad Ali al-Abid
Independent
Elected President
Hashim al-Atassi
National Bloc

The 1936 Syrian presidential election was held on 21 December 1936, when the Syrian Chamber of Deputies elected Hashim al-Atassi, president of the National Bloc, as President of the Syrian Republic by an overwhelming majority. Under the Constitution of 1930, the president was elected by parliament rather than by direct popular vote. The election followed the landslide victory of the National Bloc in the 1936 Syrian parliamentary election and the resignation of incumbent President Muhammad Ali Bey al-Abid.

== Background ==
The Syrian delegation that had negotiated the Franco-Syrian Treaty of Independence returned from Paris in early October 1936 to scenes of popular jubilation. It was received in Aleppo with a large public celebration organised by the National Bloc, attended by High Commissioner Damien de Martel, who travelled from Beirut for the occasion. In accordance with the Atassi–de Martel agreement that had brought the general strike to an end, the constitution was restored and legislative elections were called.

The High Commissioner issued a decree setting the date of parliamentary elections for 30 November 1936. National Bloc candidates won an overwhelming majority in the Chamber.

Following the National Bloc's victory, members of the Bloc asked Najib al-Armanazi, Secretary-General of the Presidential Palace, to convey to President al-Abid the necessity of his resignation in order to make way for the Bloc to complete its national mission, and he agreed. President al-Abid, recognising that Syria was entering a new era, submitted his resignation to parliament on 21 December 1936, six months before the expiry of his term of office, citing reasons of health — though contemporaries noted he was in good health and capable of continuing in his duties.

The historian Yusuf al-Hakim wrote of the resignation:

Al-Abid's resignation from the presidency was no surprise to those who had watched the National Bloc's leading figures, after the delegation's return from France, expressing their displeasure at his remaining in power following the withdrawal of the nationalist ministers and his co-operation with pro-Mandate rivals of the National Bloc... He stepped down at their signal, wishing to make way for the completion of their mission, which had taken its first step through the understanding reached with the French ministry. He attributed his resignation to reasons of health despite enjoying good health sufficient to continue his work.
His resignation from the presidency in the manner described did not prevent the people, of all classes, from continuing to hold him in affection and esteem, speaking of his integrity, broad learning, and noble character.

The caretaker government of Ata al-Ayyubi also resigned on 21 December 1936.

== Election ==
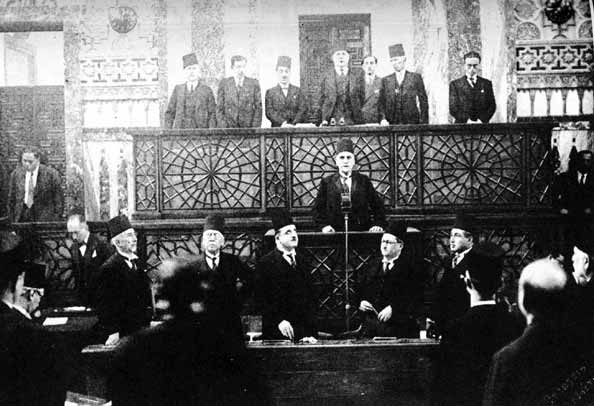
The inauguration of Hashim al-Atassi in Parliament on 21 December 1936.

On 21 December 1936, the Chamber, and the letter of resignation from President Mohammad Ali al-Abid, citing reasons of health, was read out and immediately accepted by the chamber, which then proceeded to elect his successor.

Hashim al-Atassi, deputy for Homs and president of the National Bloc, was elected by near-unanimity, receiving 74 votes out of 82.

== Regional and international reception ==
The election of Atassi was warmly welcomed across the Arab world. The Egyptian government congratulated him, and Talaat Harb, the Egyptian Prime Minister, sent a telegram wishing him success.

Amin al-Husseini, the Grand Mufti of Jerusalem, sent a telegram to Atassi and the new cabinet ministers congratulating them.
