= State of Aleppo =

State in the French Mandate of Syria (1920–25)

Coordinates: 36°13′N 37°10′E

State of Aleppo État d'Alep (French) دولة حلب (Arabic)
- 1920–1925
- Flag

- Status: 1920–1922; State administered according to the French Mandate of Syria; 1922–1925; State of the Syrian Federation (administered according to the French Mandate of Syria)
- Capital: Aleppo
- Common languages: French; Arabic; Kurdish; Turkish
- Historical era: Interwar period
  - French Mandate: 1 September 1920
  - Federation: 28 June 1922
  - Unification with State of Damascus: 1 January 1925
Preceded by	Succeeded by
Kingdom of Syria	Syrian Federation

The State of Aleppo (French: État d'Alep; Arabic: دولة حلب Dawlat Ḥalab) was one of the six states that were established by the French High Commissioner of the Levant, General Henri Gouraud, in the French Mandate of Syria which followed the San Remo conference and the collapse of King Faisal I's short-lived Arab monarchy in Syria.

The other states were the State of Damascus (1920), the Alawite State (1920), the State of Jabal Druze (1921), the Sanjak of Alexandretta (1921), as well as the State of Greater Lebanon (1920), which later became the modern country of Lebanon.

== Establishment ==
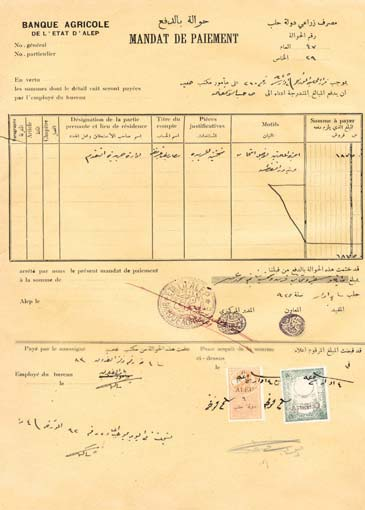
Official document carrying the name and the stamps of the State of Aleppo

The State of Aleppo was declared by the French General Henri Gouraud on 1 September 1920 as part of a French scheme to make Syria easier to control by dividing it into several smaller states. France became more hostile to the idea of a united Syria after the Battle of Maysaloun. The State of Aleppo included the Sanjak of Alexandretta and was governed by Kamil Pasha al-Qudsi.

By separating Aleppo from Damascus, Gouraud wanted to capitalize on a traditional state of competition between the two cities and turn it into political division. The people in Aleppo were unhappy with the fact that Damascus was chosen as capital for the new nation of Syria. Gouraud sensed this sentiment and tried to manipulate it by making Aleppo the capital of a large and wealthier state with which it would have been hard for Damascus to compete. The State of Aleppo as drawn by France contained most of the fertile area of Syria, including the fertile country around Aleppo as well as the entire fertile basin of the Euphrates. The state also had access to the sea via the autonomous Sanjak of Alexandretta. On the other hand, Damascus, which is an oasis on the fringes of the Syrian Desert, had neither enough fertile land nor access to sea. Gouraud wanted to make the State of Aleppo attractive to its potential rulers by giving it control over most of the agricultural and mineral wealth of Syria, so that it would not want to re-unite with Damascus.

== Population ==
There was a Sunni Muslim majority in the Aleppo State. This population was mostly Arab but also included Kurds, especially in the eastern regions, and other diverse ethnicities who had relocated during the Ottoman period, most notably Circassians, Albanians, Bosnians, Bulgars, Turks, Kabardins, Chechens, and others. Significant Shia Muslim populations lived in Aleppo too, in towns such as Nebbol, Fu'a, Az Zahra', Kefrayya and Maarrat Misrin.

Aleppo was also a home to one of the richest and most diversified Christian communities of the Orient. Christians belonging to a dozen different congregations (with prevalence of the Armenian Apostolic, Greek Catholic, and Syriac Orthodox churches) represented about a third of the population of Aleppo city, making it the city with the largest Christian community in the Middle East outside Lebanon. Many Christians inhabited the eastern districts of the state as well, being mainly of Assyrian ethnicity.

In 1923, the total population of the state was around 604,000 (excluding the nomadic population of the eastern regions). Aleppo city had also a large Jewish community.

General Distribution of Population in the State of Aleppo according to the French census in 1921-22
Religion	Inhabitants	Percentage
Sunni	502,000	83.1%
Christians	52,000	8.6%
Alawis	30,000	5%
Jews	7,000	1.2%
Foreigners	3,000	0.5%
Total	604,000	100%

== Governors ==
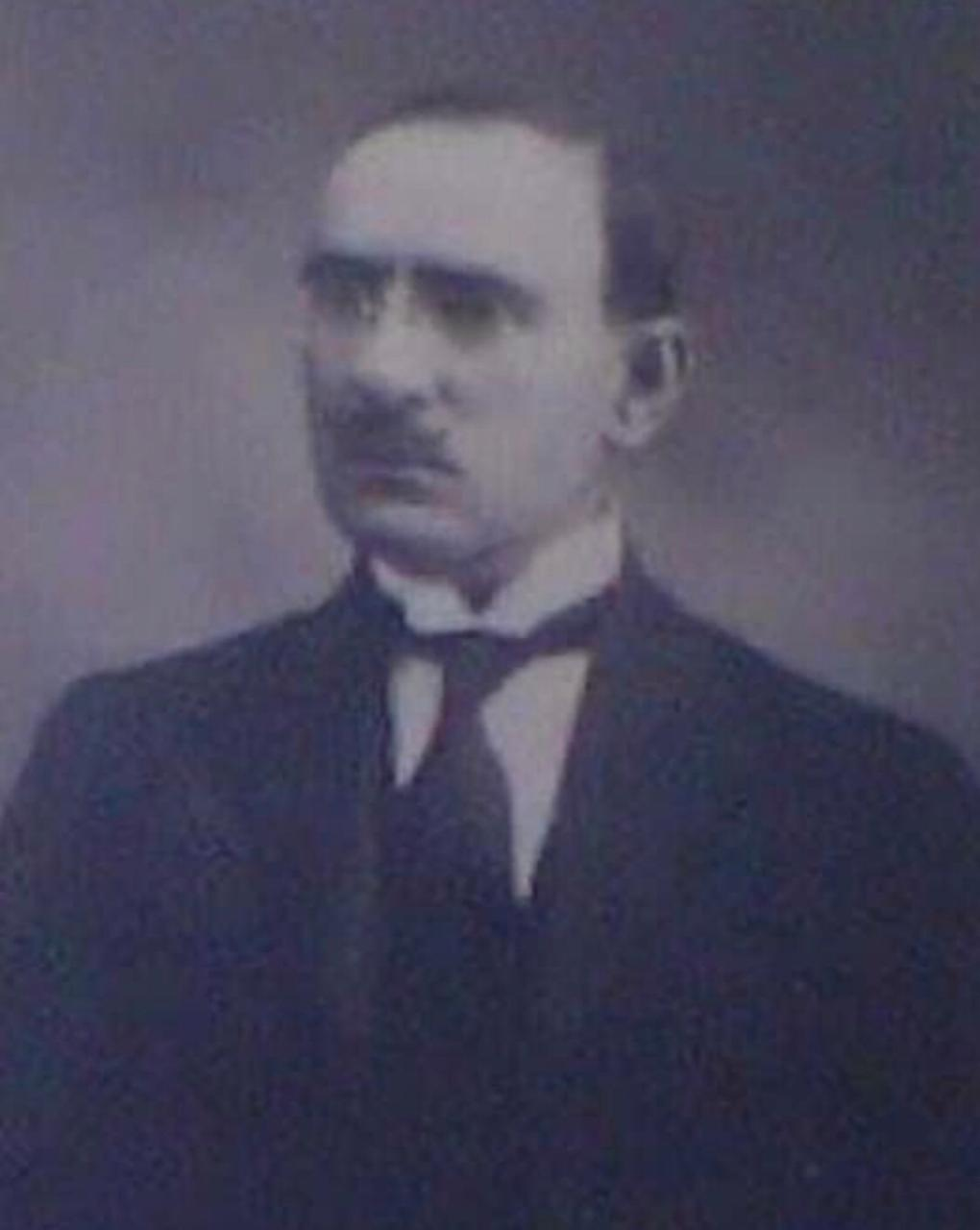
Mustafa Bey Barmada, Governor General of the State of Aleppo, 1923

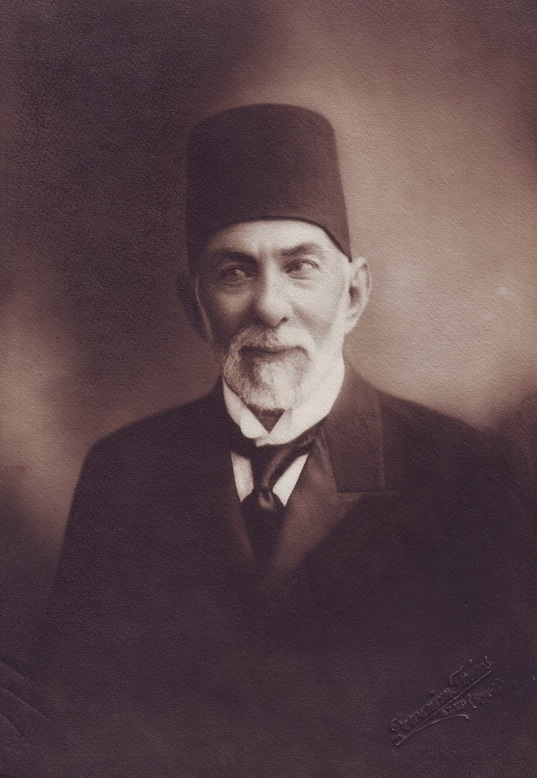
Mar'i Pasha Al Mallah, Governor General of the State of Aleppo, 1924

- 1920–1922 General Kamil Pasha al-Qudsi (1849–1926)
- 1923–1924 Mustafa Bey Barmada (1883–1953)
- 1924–1925 Mar'i Pasha Al Mallah (1856–1930)

== French Delegates ==
- 1920–1922 General Henri-Félix de Lamothe (1843–1926)
- 1922–1924 General Gaston Billotte (1875–1940)
- 1925 Monsieur Jacques Reclus

== The Council of Directors ==
Despite the desires of the French government, Islamo-Arabic resistance was sufficient in forcing the French to work through them in governing the area. Thus, the Council of Directors was created in 1920 to complement the governor general. The four members of the Council were: Mar'i Pasha Al Mallah (Interior), Subhi Bey Al Nayyal (Justice), Nasri Effendi Bakhash (Commerce and Agriculture) and Victor Effendi 'Ajouri (Finance). On Al Mallah's resignation in 1921, he was succeeded by Al Nayyal as Director of the Interior and Zaki Bey Al Gorani was selected to succeed Al Nayyal as Director of Justice. In 1923, a left-wing French government came to power and changed political direction by allowing a pan-Arabic Syria to be constructed. Thus, the Aleppo Council of Directors was abolished following the establishment of the Syrian Federation.

== The Representative Council ==
The legislature was the Representative Council, and the majority of its members were pro-French. Some of the prominent deputies were Subhi Barakat who later served as President of the Syrian Federation, Aleppo's mayor Ghaleb Bey Ibrahim Pasha, the head of the Chamber of Commerce Salim Janbarat, the lawyer Michel Janadri and Fakhir Al Jabiri, elder brother of nationalist leader Saadallah al-Jabiri.

== Hananu Revolt ==
Ibrahim Hananu was a native of Aleppo and a prominent member of the Syrian National Congress which was elected in 1919, and which refused the French mandate of Syria. Supported by the Turkish nationalist leader Mustafa Kemal Atatürk, Hananu started an armed insurgency against the French that lasted until he was arrested in 1921. Hananu was tried in the same year in an Aleppo court, but he was found not guilty by the judges by three votes to two; probably the verdict was influenced by the crowds of supporters who gathered around the courthouse in that day.

Hananu moved to political opposition afterwards, and in 1926, he played a major role in preventing the secession of Aleppo from the State of Syria established in December 1924. He died in 1935.

== The Syrian Federation and the State of Syria ==
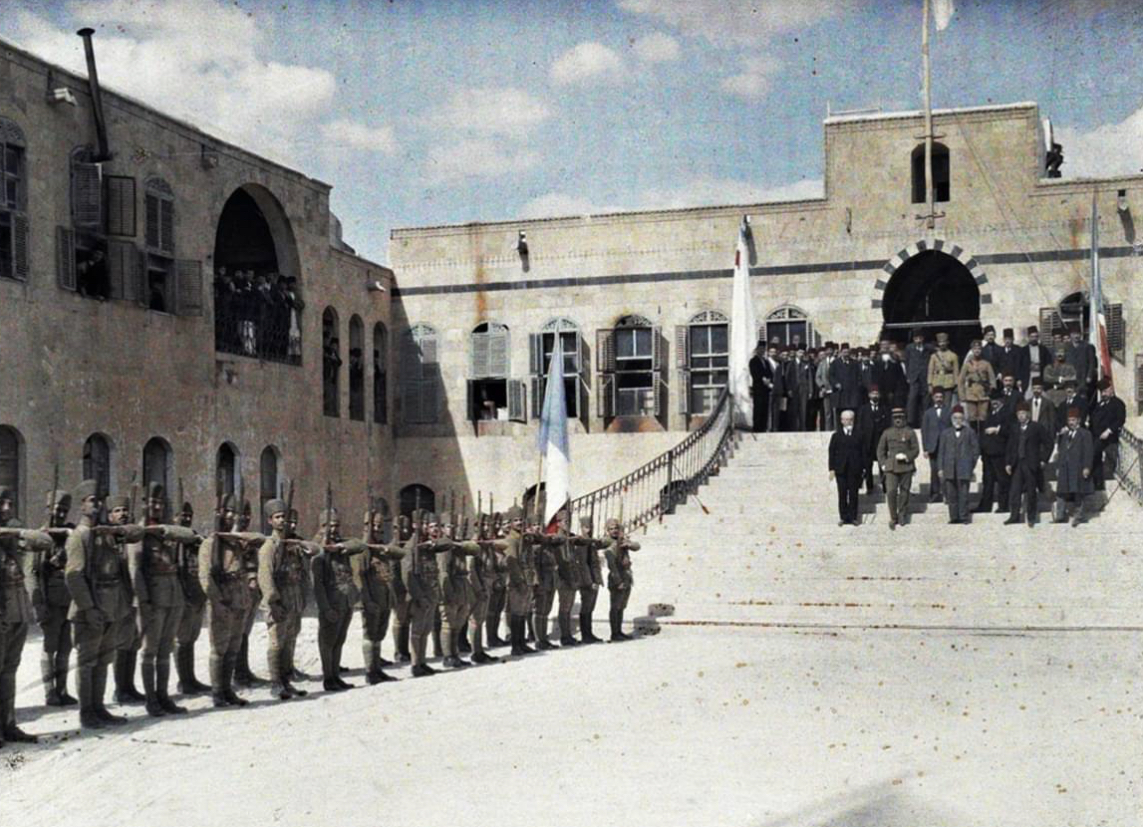
Government seat, 1921

General Gouraud created the Syrian Federation on 28 June 1922. The federation included the states of Damascus, Aleppo, and the Alawite State. In 1924, the Alawite State was separated again. The Syrian Federation was incorporated into the State of Syria on 1 January 1925. With the centralization of the new Syrian state in 1925, Aleppo lost its autonomy and reduced to provincial dependency on Damascus. The incumbent governor general of the state of Aleppo the Moslem Mar'i Pasha Al Mallah was named governor (vali) of the province of Aleppo (with a rank of minister). However, the colonial flag of the State of Aleppo remained in use until 25 January 1925 when it was finally abolished.

== See also ==
- French Mandate of Syria
- State of Alawites
- Jabal el Druze (state)
- Alexandretta / Hatay
- State of Damascus
- List of French possessions and colonies
- French colonial empire
- French colonial flags
