= 1948 Syrian presidential election =

- 18 April 1948
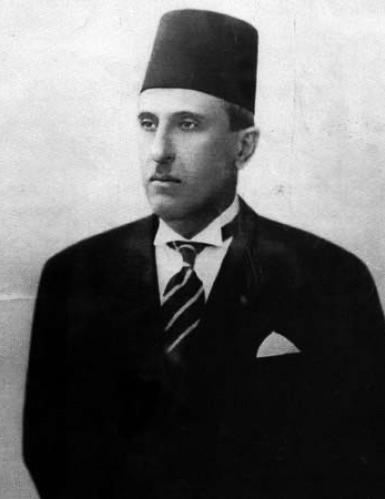
| Candidate | Shukri al-Quwatli |
| Party | National Party |
| Electoral vote | 123 |
| Percentage | 98.4% |
President before election
Shukri al-Quwatli
National Bloc
Elected President
Shukri al-Quwatli
National Party

The 1948 Syrian presidential election was held on 18 April 1948, when the Syrian Chamber of Deputies re-elected Shukri al-Quwatli as President of the Syrian Republic by 123 votes out of 125. The election was preceded by a constitutional amendment that removed the bar on a sitting president seeking immediate re-election, making al-Quwatli the first Syrian president to serve two consecutive terms.

== Background ==
Under Article 68 of the Constitution of 1930, as operative at the time, the President of the Republic was elected by secret ballot with an absolute majority of the members of the Chamber of Deputies, served a term of five years, and could not be re-elected until five years had elapsed since the end of his presidency. As al-Quwatli's first term was due to expire in 1948, the constitution as written precluded his immediate re-election.

Eighty-eight deputies proposed an amendment to permit al-Quwatli's re-election. On the basis of this proposal, the Constitutional Committee convened on 20 March 1948 and sat until late into the night. Comprising representatives of all parliamentary blocs and parties, it announced its unanimous approval of an amendment to Article 68, which was revised to read as follows:

The President of the Republic is elected by secret ballot with an absolute majority of the members of the Chamber of Deputies; a relative majority suffices in the second round of voting. His presidency shall last five years. He may not be elected for a third term.
No one may be elected to the presidency of the Republic unless he possesses the qualifications that render him eligible for parliamentary membership and has completed his thirty-fifth year of age.

When the members of the Chamber were called to vote on the amended article, they approved it by what amounted to unanimity. The chamber then proceeded to the election of the President of the Republic, held in the presence of a large number of citizens and diplomatic representatives.

== Election ==
The 3rd Chamber of Deputies held a special session on the morning of Sunday, 18 April 1948, attended by members of the Arab and foreign diplomatic corps. A Lebanese delegation was also present, headed by the Deputy Prime Minister, and Speaker of the Lebanese Chamber of Deputies.

The session opened at eleven o'clock with the reading of the minutes of the previous session. The Speaker addressed the chamber:

This session is convened for the election of the President of the Republic. I ask each of you to elect the person of your choice, write his name on a ballot paper, and when your name is called, come forward to the ballot box and place your paper.

Deputies came forward one by one to cast their ballots. When the votes were counted, 125 deputies had voted. Shukri al-Quwatli received 123 votes; two ballot papers were blank.

When the result was announced, it was met with a storm of applause, and cannon fire rang out across the Republic.

== Results ==
| Canditates | Parties | Votes | % |
|---|---|---|---|
| Shukri al-Quwatli | National Party | 123 | 98.4 |
| Required majority | | 68 votes | 50% of MPs |
| Valid votes | | 123 | 98.4 |
| Blank and invalid votes | | 2 | 1.6 |
| Total | | 125 | 100 |
| Registered voters / turnout | | 134 | 93.3 |
