= December 1949 Syrian presidential election =

- 14 December 1949
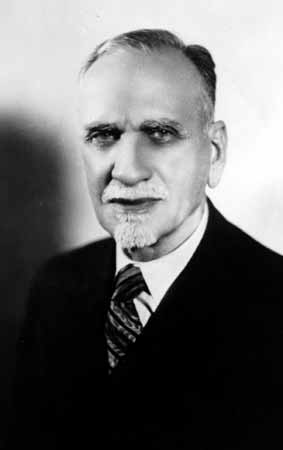
Candidate	Hashim al-Atassi
Party	People's
Electoral vote	89
Percentage	82.4%
President before election
Sami al-Hinnawi
(de facto)
Elected President
Hashim al-Atassi
People's

Presidential elections were held in Syria on 14 December 1949, when the Syrian Constituent Assembly elected Hashim al-Atassi as provisional Head of State by 89 votes out of 108 cast. The election followed the adoption of a provisional constitution by the Constituent Assembly on the same day, and took place in the turbulent aftermath of two military coups earlier that year. Al-Atassi, widely known as the "Father of the Republic" and "Father of the Constitution," was returning to the highest office for the second time, having previously served as president from 1936 to 1939.

== Background ==
On 14 August 1949, Brigadier General Sami al-Hinnawi led a coup against President Husni al-Za'im, who had himself come to power in a coup earlier that year. On the evening of the same day, a government was formed under Hashim al-Atassi as Prime Minister.

The government oversaw a series of amendments to Syria's electoral system, the most significant of which were: the granting of voting rights to women; the abolition of sectarian quotas in the allocation of seats; and the lowering of the voting age from twenty to eighteen years. On 21 September 1949, a decree was issued setting 5 October 1949 as the date for elections to a Constituent Assembly charged with drafting a provisional constitution.

The Constituent Assembly held its inaugural session on the morning of 12 December 1949, followed by a second session that evening, at which it considered the draft provisional constitution submitted by the government. A third session on 13 December was devoted to debating its articles.

== Election ==
Following the adoption of the provisional constitution on 14 December, Speaker al-Kikhya announced the need to elect a Head of State. The session was briefly suspended so that the election could be held in a dedicated session.

After fifteen minutes, the session resumed. Three candidates stood: Hashim al-Atassi, Rushdi al-Kikhya, and Hayil al-Surur. Two ballot boxes were used to collect the votes of the 108 participating members. The results were as follows:

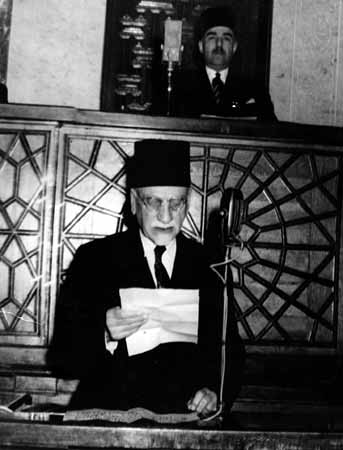
The second inauguration of al-Atassi in December 1949.

Canditates	Parties	Votes	%
Hashim al-Atassi	People's Party	89	82.4
Adnan al-Atassi	People's Party	5	4.6
Rushdi al-Kikhya	People's Party	2	1.9
Hayil al-Surur		2	1.9
Faydi al-Atassi	People's Party	1	0.9
Required majority		58 votes	50% of MPs
Valid votes		99	91.7
Blank and invalid votes		9	8.3
Total		108	100
Registered voters / turnout		114	94.7

The five votes cast for Adnan al-Atassi, who was not a formal candidate, were a deliberate signal from a group of deputies — including Akram al-Hourani — intended to convey that Hashim al-Atassi's real guide was his son Adnan, given the latter's considerable influence over him.
