= First Syrian Republic =

French mandate territory (1930–1950)

Coordinates: 35.0000°N 38.0000°E

Syrian Republic اَلْجُمْهُورِيَّةُ ٱلْسُوْرِيَّة (Arabic) al-Jumhūriyyah as-Sūriyyah République syrienne (French)
- 1930–1950
- Flag Emblem (1945–1950)
- Anthem: حُمَاةَ الدَّيَّارِ Ḥumāt ad-Diyār "Guardians of the Homeland"
- Territory of the Syrian Republic as proposed in the unratified Franco-Syrian Treaty of 1936. (Lebanon was not part of the plan). In 1938, Alexandretta was also excluded.
- Status: Class A League of Nations mandate of France (1930–1946); Sovereign republic (1946–1950)
- Capital: Damascus
- Common languages: Arabic (official), French, Syriac, Armenian, Kurdish, Turkish
- Religion: Islam (all branches incl. Alawite), Christianity, Judaism, Druzism, Yazidism
- Government: French Mandate (1930–1946) Unitary parliamentary republic (1946–1950): under a military dictatorship (1949–1950)
- High Commissioner
  - 1930–1933 (first): Henri Ponsot
  - 1944–1946 (last): Paul Beynet
- President
  - 1932–1936 (first): Muhammad Ali al-Abid
  - 1949–1950 (last): Hashim al-Atassi
- Prime Minister
  - 1932–1934 (first): Haqqi al-Azm
  - 1950 (last): Nazim al-Kudsi
- Legislature: Chamber of Deputies (1931–1949)
- History
  - Constitution: 14 May 1930
  - Treaty of Independence: 9 September 1936
  - Hatay State: 7 September 1938
  - Syrian sovereignty / UN admission: 24 October 1945
  - Withdrawal of French troops: 17 April 1946
  - New constitution: 5 September 1950

Area
  - Total: 192,424 km^{2} (74,295 sq mi)
- Currency: Syrian pound
Preceded by
1930: State of Syria
1936: Alawite State
Jabal Druze State
Succeeded by
1938: Hatay State
1950: Second Syrian Republic
- Today part of: Syria; Turkey

The First Syrian Republic, (Note: Arabic: الجمهورية السورية الأولى) officially the Syrian Republic, (Note: Arabic: الجمهورية السورية al-Jumhūriyyah as-Sūriyyah; French: République syrienne) was formed in 1930 as a component of the Mandate for Syria and the Lebanon, succeeding the State of Syria. A treaty of independence was made in 1936 to grant independence to Syria and end official French rule, but the French parliament refused to accept the treaty. From 1940 to 1941, the Syrian Republic was under the control of Vichy France, and after the Allied invasion in 1941 gradually went on the path towards independence. The proclamation of independence took place in 1944, but only in October 1945 was the Syrian Republic de jure recognized by the United Nations; it became a de facto sovereign state on 17 April 1946, with the withdrawal of French troops. It was succeeded by the Second Syrian Republic upon the adoption of a new constitution on 5 September 1950.

== Background ==
On 23 December 1925, Henri de Jouvenel was appointed as French High Commissioner for Syria, and on 28 April 1926, the High Commissioner appointed Ahmad Nami as Prime Minister and Head of State, who formed a government consisting of six ministers, three of whom were nationalists, and it was agreed with the French High Commissioner on the government's work agenda made known the ten points, the most important points were:

- Election of the constituent assembly.
- Replacement of the mandate by a treaty between Syria and France for a term of thirty years that would safeguard the rights, duties, and interests of both parties identically to the agreement between Iraq and Great Britain.
- Completion of Syrian unity.
- Creation of a national army so that French troops can gradually withdraw from Syrian territory.
- France's aid in having Syria admitted to the League of Nations.
- A general amnesty for all political crimes, especially those related to the great revolution.

The three governments which were formed by Ahmed Nami between May 1926 and February 1928 were unable to fulfill their agenda. High commissioner Henri de Jouvenel’s replacement by Henri Ponsot in September 1926 with a change of direction regarding the Syrian question, and contrary to the general amnesty, the French arrested the three national government ministers in September 1926 and exiled them to Lebanon.

The French High Commissioner began a series of discussions in Beirut with the main Syrian national leaders Hashim al-Atassi and Ibrahim Hananu on the future constitution, which failed to reach any agreement. On 15 February 1928, Ahmed Nami resigned, and the High Commissioner appointed Sheikh Taj al-Din al-Hasani as the new interim head of state.

The High Commissioner decreed an amnesty before the elections, terming it a general amnesty but excluding charges related to the great revolution and key Syrian-Lebanese nationalist leaders such as Shukri al-Quwatli, Abdel Rahman Shahbandar, Fawzi Qawukji, Ihsan Jabri (Syria), Amin Rouhaiaha and Mohamed Shureiki (Alawi region), Sultan al-Atrash (Jabal Druze), as well as Shakib Arslan, and Shaib Whab (Lebanon). Therefore, Great Syrian Revolt leaders were unable to participate in the elections.

The nationalists formed a new political grouping in preparation for the elections that included the former National Party, some members of the People's Party, and independent figures, most of which are local, and called themselves the National Bloc, and Hashim al-Atassi was elected as its president. Elections were held in April 1928 and 70 members were elected, and the results were not decided, but in favor of urban nationalists and rural moderates.

The project of a new constitution was discussed by a Constituent Assembly elected in April 1928, but as the pro-independence National Bloc had won a majority and insisted on the insertion of several articles "that did not preserve the prerogatives of the mandatary power".

The Constituent Assembly convened on 9 May 1928, at the Government Premises, and unanimously elected Mr. Hashem al-Atassi as its president, and after the arrival of Henri Ponsott, the High Commissioner, and Taj al-Din al-Hasani, the Prime Minister and his ministers. The Constituent Assembly began to recite of the articles of the Constitution, then the meeting was suspended to the date of 11 August 1928, when the session opened again in the presence of the High Commissioner, the Prime Minister and his ministers, then the rest of the articles of the constitution were recited, and upon voting on it as a whole, approved by the Constituent Assembly for all its 115 articles, including the six articles (2, 72, 73, 75, 110, 112 and many relate to the authorities of the President and the Army), which was the men of the mandate are expecting for its abolition from the constitution, for inconsistency with the mandate system.

The High Commissioner withdrew from the session angry and followed by the Prime Minister and ministers, and he issued a decision to postpone the convening of the Constituent Assembly for a period of three months, hoping that an agreement would be reached on the six articles of the Constitution that contradict the mandate policy, and postponement of the negotiations were repeated to no avail. Then when the Constituent Assembly opened its session on 5 February 1929, the head of the political division of the High Commission surprised them and read to the deputies the High Commissioner's memorandum containing the eliminate the six articles opposing the mandate's policy and declaring the suspension of the Constituent Assembly indefinitely.

== History ==
=== Mandatory Syrian Republic (1930–1946) ===
==== The first Syrian constitution ====
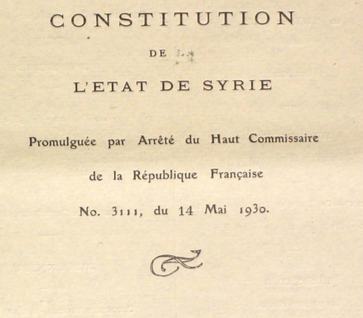
Title page of the 1930 "Constitution of the Syrian State"

On 14 May 1930 the French high commissioner promulgated a constitution for the Syrian State. On 22 May 1930 the State of Syria was declared the Republic of Syria and a new Syrian Constitution was promulgated by the French High Commissioner, in the same time as the Lebanese Constitution, the Règlement du Sandjak d'Alexandrette, the Statute of the Alawi Government, the Statute of the Jabal Druze State. A new flag was also mentioned in this constitution:

The Syrian flag shall be composed as follows, the length shall be double the height. It shall contain three bands of equal dimensions, the upper band being green, the middle band white, and the lower band black. The white portion shall bear three red stars in line, having five points each.

During 20 December 1931 and 4 January 1932, the first elections under the new constitution were held, under an electoral law providing for "the representation of religious minorities" as imposed by article 37 of the constitution. The National Bloc was in the minority in the new chamber of deputies with only 16 deputies out of 70, due to intensive vote-rigging by the French authorities. Among the deputies were also three members of the Syrian Kurdish nationalist Xoybûn (Khoyboun) party, Khalil bey Ibn Ibrahim Pacha (Al-Jazira Province), Mustafa bey Ibn Shahin (Jarabulus) and Hassan Aouni (Kurd Dagh). There were later in the year, from 30 March to 6 April, "complementary elections". On 11 June 1932 the Syrian Chamber of Deputies elected Muhammad 'Ali Bay al-'Abid as president, the Syrian State was renamed the Republic of Syria in July 1932.

In 1933, France attempted to impose a treaty of independence heavily prejudiced in favor of France. It promised gradual independence but kept the Syrian mountains under French control. The Syrian head of state at the time was a French puppet, Muhammad 'Ali Bay al-'Abid. Fierce opposition to this treaty was spearheaded by senior nationalist and parliamentarian Hashim al-Atassi, who called for a 50-day strike in protest. Atassi's political coalition, the National Bloc, mobilized massive popular support for his call. Riots and demonstrations raged, and the economy came to a standstill.

==== Franco-Syrian Treaty of Independence and the Sandjak of Alexandretta ====
After negotiations in March with Damien de Martel, the French High Commissioner in Syria, Hashim al-Atassi went to Paris heading a senior National Bloc delegation. The new Popular Front-led French government, formed in June 1936 after the April–May elections, had agreed to recognize the National Bloc as the sole legitimate representatives of the Syrian people and invited al-Atassi to independence negotiations. The resulting treaty called for immediate recognition of Syrian independence as a sovereign republic, with full emancipation granted gradually over a 25-year period.

In 1936, the Franco-Syrian Treaty of Independence was signed, a treaty that would not be ratified by the French legislature. However, the treaty allowed Jabal Druze, the Alawite region (now called Latakia), and Alexandretta to be incorporated into the Syrian Republic within the following two years. Greater Lebanon (now the Lebanese Republic) was the only state that did not join the Syrian Republic. Hashim al-Atassi, who was Prime Minister during King Faisal's brief reign (1918–1920), was the first president to be elected under a new constitution adopted after the independence treaty.

The treaty guaranteed incorporation of previously autonomous Druze and Alawite regions into Greater Syria, but not Lebanon, with which France signed a similar treaty in November. The treaty also promised curtailment of French intervention in Syrian domestic affairs as well as a reduction of French troops, personnel and military bases in Syria. In return, Syria pledged to support France in times of war, including the use of its air space, and to allow France to maintain two military bases on Syrian territory. Other political, economic and cultural provisions were included.

Atassi returned to Syria in triumph on 27 September 1936 and was elected President of the Republic in November.

In September 1938, France separated the Syrian Sanjak of Alexandretta, despite its territory being guaranteed as part of Syria in the treaty, and transformed it into Hatay State, which joined Turkey in June 1939. Syria did not recognize the incorporation of Hatay into Turkey and the issue is still disputed until the present time.

The emerging threat of Nazi Germany induced a fear of being outflanked by it if France relinquished its colonies in the Middle East. That, coupled with lingering imperialist inclinations in some levels of the French government, led France to reconsider its promises and refuse to ratify the treaty. Riots again broke out, Atassi resigned, and Syrian independence was deferred until after World War II.

==== World War II and independence ====
With the fall of France in 1940 during World War II, Syria came under the control of the Vichy Government until the British and Free French invaded and occupied the country in July 1941. Syria proclaimed its independence again in 1941 but it was not until 1 January 1944 that it was recognized as an independent republic.

On 27 September 1941, Free France proclaimed, by virtue of, and within the framework of the Mandate, the independence and sovereignty of the Syrian State. The proclamation said "the independence and sovereignty of Syria and Lebanon will not affect the juridical situation as it results from the Mandate act. Indeed, this situation could be changed only with the agreement of the Council of the League of Nations, with the consent of the Government of the United States, a signatory of the Franco-American Convention of 4 April 1924, and only after the conclusion between the French Government and the Syrian and Lebanese Governments of treaties duly ratified in accordance with the laws of the French Republic.

Bengt Broms said that it was important to note that there were several founding members of the United Nations whose statehood was doubtful at the time of the San Francisco Conference and that the Government of France still considered Syria and Lebanon to be mandates.

Duncan Hall said "Thus, the Syrian mandate may be said to have been terminated without any formal action on the part of the League or its successor. The mandate was terminated by the declaration of the mandatory power, and of the new states themselves, of their independence, followed by a process of piecemeal unconditional recognition by other powers, culminating in formal admission to the United Nations. Article 78 of the Charter ended the status of tutelage for any member state: 'The trusteeship system shall not apply to territories which have become Members of the United Nations, relationship among which shall be based on respect for the principle of sovereign equality.'" So when the UN officially came into existence on 24 October 1945, after ratification of the United Nations Charter by the five permanent members, as both Syria and Lebanon were founding member states, the French mandate for both was legally terminated on that date and full independence attained.

In late May 1945, tensions between Syrian nationalists and French authorities erupted into open conflict during the final months of the French Mandate for Syria and Lebanon. On 29 May, French forces bombarded sections of Damascus and stormed the Syrian parliament in an attempt to arrest elected government leaders, including President Shukri al-Quwatli and Speaker Saadallah al-Jabiri, both of whom narrowly escaped capture. The assault caused extensive damage to the city and resulted in civilian casualties, marking a pivotal episode in the struggle for Syrian independence, later referred to as the Levant Crisis or Damascus Crisis.

At the time of the French attack on Damascus, Syrian Prime Minister Fares al-Khoury was attending the founding conference of the United Nations in San Francisco to advocate for Syrian independence from French rule. The crisis drew international attention and provoked British diplomatic and military pressure. British Prime Minister Winston Churchill warned the French government and ordered British forces stationed in Transjordan to intervene if necessary to stop further French military action against Syrian nationalists.

Syria’s independence was formally recognized on 24 October 1945, coinciding with its acceptance as a founding member of the United Nations. Continued pressure from Syrian nationalist movements, alongside diplomatic intervention, led to the withdrawal of the last French troops on 17 April 1946, a date commemorated in Syria as Evacuation Day.

=== Independent First Syrian Republic (1946–1950) ===
After the withdrawal of French troops on 17 April 1946, Syria entered the era of the First Syrian Republic as a fully independent state, though it continued using and amending the Constitution of 1930, which had been promulgated under the French Mandate and later revised. In 1947, Syria joined the International Monetary Fund (IMF) and pegged its currency, the Syrian pound, to the U.S. dollar at a fixed rate of 2.19 pounds to 1 dollar, a rate maintained for more than a decade as part of efforts to stabilize the early post‑mandate economy.

Politically, the republic faced significant challenges following independence. In 1948, Syria participated in military operations as part of the Arab League’s intervention in the newly declared State of Israel. Syrian forces, which were small, poorly equipped, and lacked the capacity for large-scale independent operations, engaged in limited actions along the northern front in coordination with other Arab armies. They were unable to achieve significant strategic gains, and armistice agreements signed in 1949 left Israel firmly established. Thus also resulted in the forced expulsion and flight of many Palestinian Arabs during the Nakba, some of whom crossed into Syria, creating social and economic pressures for the young republic. The outcome highlighted the weaknesses of Syria’s military and exposed limitations in the civilian government’s ability to prepare and manage national defense, contributing to growing dissatisfaction with parliamentary politics and setting the stage for the first military coup in March 1949.

On 30 March 1949, Brigadier General Husni al-Za'im led the first military coup in Syria’s modern history, overthrowing President Shukri al-Quwatli's democratically elected government and dissolving parliament. The coup marked a turning point, introducing military intervention as a recurring feature in Syrian politics and reflecting broader dissatisfaction with civilian leadership after the setbacks of the 1948 war.

Al-Za'im's rule was brief. On 14–15 August 1949, Colonel Sami al-Hinnawi led the second military coup, overthrowing al‑Za'im and restoring civilian politicians under the presidency of Hashem al-Atassi before he, in turn, was ousted later that year by Colonel Adib Shishakli in a third coup. These successive coups illustrated deep divisions within the officer corps and persistent challenges to establishing stable parliamentary governance in the young republic.

Despite recurring instability, a new constitution was drafted and adopted on 5 September 1950, replacing the amended 1930 constitution and inaugurating the Second Syrian Republic. The 1950 Constitution expanded civil liberties and reinforced parliamentary authority, although political turbulence continued in the early 1950s as Syria grappled with military influence and fragile civilian governance.
