= State of Damascus =

Former state in the French Mandate of Syria

Coordinates: 33.513°N 36.292°E

State of Damascus État de Damas (French) دولة دمشق (Arabic)
- 1920–1925
- Flag

- Location of the State of Damascus (yellow) within the Mandate for Syria
- Status: 1920–1922; State administered according to the French Mandate of Syria; 1922–1925; State of the Syrian Federation (administered according to the French Mandate of Syria)
- Capital: Damascus
- Common languages: French; Arabic
- Historical era: Interwar period
  - French Mandate: 25 July 1920
  - State of Damascus was declared: 3 September 1920
  - Jabal Druze State separated: 1 May 1921
  - Federation: 28 June 1922
  - Unification with State of Aleppo: 1 January 1925
Preceded by	Succeeded by
Arab Kingdom of Syria	1921: Jabal Druze State; 1922: Syrian Federation

The State of Damascus (French: État de Damas; Arabic: دولة دمشق Dawlat Dimashq) was one of the six states established by the French General Henri Gouraud in the French Mandate of Syria which followed the San Remo conference of 1920 and the defeat of King Faisal's short-lived monarchy in Syria.

The other states were the State of Aleppo (1920), the State of Alawites (1920), the State of Jabal Druze (1921), the Sanjak of Alexandretta (1921), and the State of Greater Lebanon (1920), which later became the modern country of Lebanon.

== Establishment ==
The State of Damascus was declared by the French General Henri Gouraud on 3 September 1920, with Damascus as its capital. The first president of the new state was Haqqi Al-Azm. The state of Damascus included Damascus and its surrounding region, in addition to the cities of Homs, Hama and the Orontes river valley.

The new Damascus state lost four Qada's (sub-districts) that had been part of the Vilayet (district) of Damascus during Ottoman times to the mainly Christian Mount Lebanon to create the new State of Greater Lebanon. The territory separated from Damascus corresponds today to the Biqa' valley plus south Lebanon. Damascus, and later Syria, continuously protested the separation of these lands and kept demanding them back throughout the mandate period. The population of these regions, which was mainly Muslim, also protested the separation from Damascus.

== Syrian Federation and the State of Syria ==
On 28 June 1922, general Gouraud announced the Syrian Federation which included the states of Damascus, Aleppo, and the Alawite state. In 1924, the Alawite State was separated again. The Syrian Federation became the State of Syria on 1 January 1925.

== Population ==
General Distribution of Population in the State of Damascus according to the French census in 1921-22
Religion	Inhabitants	Percentage
Sunni	447,000	75.1%
Christians	67,000	11.3%
Foreigners	49,000	8.2%
Twelvers	9,000	1.5%
Ismailis	8,000	1.3%
Jews	6,000	1.1%
Alawis	5,000	0.8%
Druzes	4,000	0.7%
Total	595,000	100%

== See also ==
- French Mandate of Syria
- State of Alawites
- Jabal el Druze (state)
- Alexandretta / Hatay
- State of Aleppo
- List of French possessions and colonies
- French colonial empire
- French colonial flags
