= Muhammad Ali Bey al-Abid =

President of Syria

Muhammad Ali Bey al-Abid محمد علي بك العابد
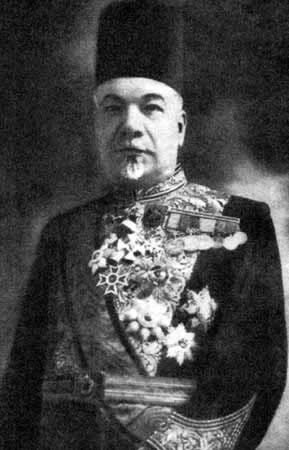
- al-Abid in 1932

President of the Mandatory Syrian Republic
- In office 11 June 1932 – 21 December 1936
- Prime Minister: Taj al-Din al-Hasani
- Preceded by: Taj al-Din al-Hasani (as president of the State of Syria)
- Succeeded by: Hashim al-Atassi

Ambassador of the Ottoman Empire to the United States
- In office 1907–1908

Personal details
- Born: 1867 Damascus, Syria Vilayet, Ottoman Empire
- Died: 22 October 1939 (aged 71–72) Rome, Kingdom of Italy
- Resting place: Syria
- Party: National Bloc
- Spouse: Zahra al-Yusuf

Muhammad Ali Bey al-Abid (Arabic: محمد علي بك العابد, ALA-LC: Muḥammad 'Alī Bak al-'Ābid; 1867 – 22 October 1939; or, as he spelled his own name in French, Mehmed Ali Abed) was a Syrian politician and statesman. He was appointed the president of the mandatory Syrian Republic (from 11 June 1932 until 21 December 1936) as a nominee of the nationalist Syrian parliament in Damascus after the country received partial recognition of sovereignty from France. France agreed to recognize Syria as a nation under intense nationalist pressure but did not withdraw its troops completely until 1946.

== Life ==
=== Background and education ===
Muhammad Ali al-Abid was born in Damascus, then in the Ottoman Empire. His father, Ahmad Izzat al-Abid, the son of Hawlu al-Abid, had initially been brought up in Damascus before pursuing his education in Beirut, Beirut Vilayet. Ahmad Izzat al-Abid, who was fluent in Arabic, French, and Turkish, started working in the administration of Damascus Vilayet and was authorized to found a periodical. Muhammad Ali was educated in the primary schools of Damascus then continued his education in 1885 in Beirut. In 1887, Ahmad Izzat al-Abid closed his periodical and moved to Constantinople (now Istanbul). Muhammad Ali moved with his family to Constantinople where he was sent to Galatasaray High School, a prestigious Ottoman high school. He would then study law in Paris, France, and Islamic jurisprudence, graduating in 1905. In the meantime, in 1894, his father had been introduced to Sultan 'Abdu’l-Hamid II and would become the sultan's adviser and serve as the head of his intelligence services, and also govern over the Iraqi city of Mosul.

=== Diplomatic and political career ===
Muhammad Ali al-Abid was fluent in Arabic, French, and Turkish and fond of French literature and economics; he also had a good knowledge of English and Persian. Al-Abid started to work in the Foreign Affairs administration. In 1907, he became the Ottoman Empire's ambassador to Washington. However, he returned to the Ottoman Empire soon, after the declaration of the Ottoman Empire's constitution on 23 July 1908, when the Young Turks revolted against Abdu'l-Hamid II. His father escaped from Constantinople and went to London. Al-Abid joined his father traveling between England, Switzerland, France, and reached Egypt on the eve of World War I. (Note: His father would eventually die in Cairo in 1924.)

Al-Abid moved back to Damascus in the summer of 1920 when Syria came under the French Mandate. In 1922, Al-Abid was appointed Syria's Minister of Finance.

On 30 April 1932 Al-Abid was elected to the parliament in Damascus as a nominee of the National Bloc (Syria) and then elevated to the presidency on 11 June of the same year.

In 1936, after a free parliament was elected in Damascus, he resigned and went to Paris. He was replaced by Hashim al-Atasi, the nominee of the National Bloc, though Syria would remain in control militarily until full independence in 1946.

Al-Abid died on 22 October 1939, from a heart attack at a hotel in Rome. His body was transferred to Beirut, from which the funerary procession left to Damascus on 16 November. Bahij al-Khatib had become president a few months before his death.

== Distinctions ==
- Commander of the Legion of Honour (1932)

== See also ==
- Ottoman Empire-United States relations
