= Syrian Federation =

Former state in the French Mandate of Syria

Federation of the Autonomous States of Syria Fédération des États autonomes de Syrie
- 1922–1925
- Flag

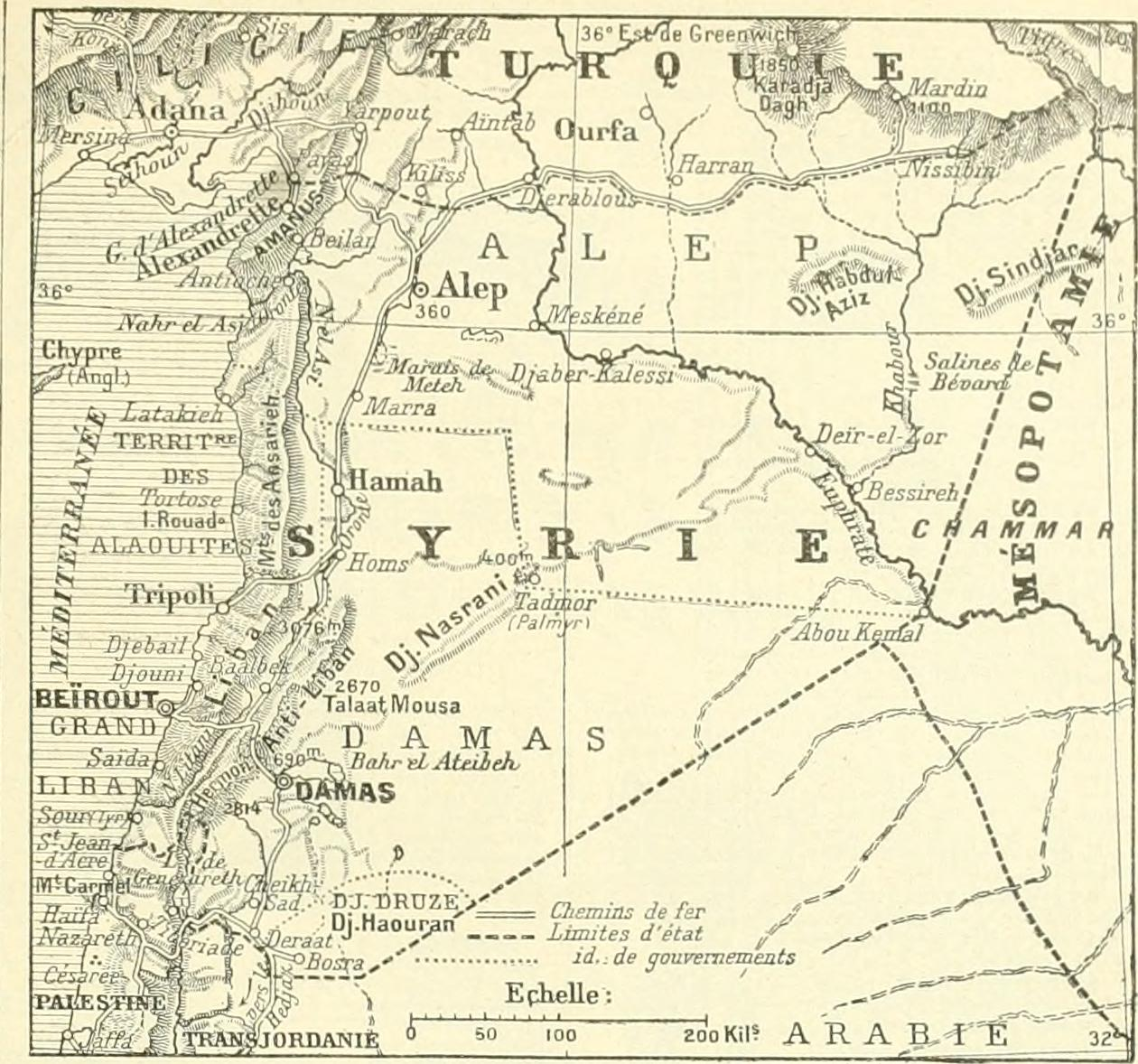
- 1922 map of French Mandate in Syria
- Status: Federal state administered by the French Mandate of Syria
- Capital: Aleppo^{[a]} (1922–1923); Damascus (1923–1925)
- President
  - 1922–1925: Subhi Bey Barakat
- Legislature: Federal Council
- History
  - Established: 28 June 1922
  - Dissolution effective: 1 January 1925

Area
- 119,000–120,000 km^{2} (46,000–46,000 sq mi)
- Currency: Lebanese-Syrian pound
- ISO 3166 code: SY
Preceded by
State of Aleppo
State of Damascus
Alawite Territory
Succeeded by
State of Syria
State of the Alawites
- Today part of: Syria; Turkey; Golan Heights (Occupied by Israel)
- ^{a} The capital was initially planned to alternate between Aleppo and Damascus.

The Syrian Federation (Arabic: الاتحاد السوري; French: Fédération syrienne), officially the Federation of the Autonomous States of Syria (French: Fédération des États autonomes de Syrie), was a federal state administered by French Mandate of Syria. It was constituted on 28 June 1922 by High Commissary Gouraud. It comprised the States of Aleppo, Damascus, and of the Alawites, spanning an area of 119,000 to 120,000 km^{2}. It was officially dissolved by decree of 5 December 1924 "which received its application starting on 1 January 1925".

== History ==
The Syrian Federation was founded on 28 June 1922 as a result of Decree 1459 from the High Commissioner of the Levant, Henri Gouraud. It comprised the states of Aleppo, Damascus, and the Alawites, spanning an area of 119,000 to 120,000 km^{2}. Lebanon was excluded from the federation owing to Maronite opposition, stemming from the union’s Sunni Muslim majority. The federation's government consisted of the President of the Federation and the Federal Council, which initially alternated between sitting in Aleppo and Damascus. Homs was also considered a potential capital city. The first session of the Federal Council opened in Aleppo on 28 June 1922 with a speech from Gouraud. On 8 January 1923 Damascus became the permanent seat of government, creating divisions in the country's political leadership. The population of Aleppo showed little enthusiasm for unifying the Syrian states, viewing the arrangement as beneficial to Damascus and other areas at Aleppo’s disadvantage. They favored preserving Aleppo’s independent status, consistent with its position under Ottoman rule and in previous periods. Once the capital was moved to Damascus, Aleppines believed they had been deceived.

The Syrian Federation's only president was Subhi Bey Barakat, who claimed in his first three presidential decrees to have been elected by the Federal Council on 29 June, 1922. However, according to Syrian historian and jurist Edmond Rabbath, Barakat was in fact "ineligible in the year following the end of his presidency" and therefore "appointed and not elected." Barakat was nevertheless formally elected president by the Federal Council on 17 December 1923.

The Syrian Federation was officially dissolved by Decree 2980, which was issued on 5 December 1924 by High Commissioner Maxime Weygand and took effect on 1 January 1925. The decree merged the states of Aleppo and Damascus into the State of Syria and named Barakat president of the new country.

== Government ==
The President of the Federation was elected by an absolute majority of the Federal Council and held office for a term of one year. Afterwards, the president would be ineligible for re-election for one year following their departure from office. They exercised executive powers such as the preparation of the federal budget, the nomination of government officials and the negotiation of treaties with non-federated states, all subject to the ratification of the High Commissariat of the Levant. The Federal Council was a deliberative body composed of five representatives. It studied proposals leading to the adoption of legislation and dealt with economic affairs, such as public works.

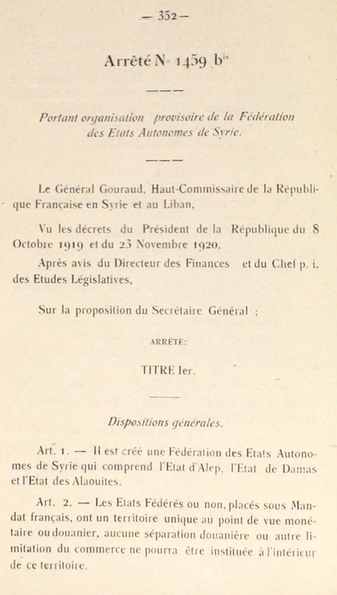
Decree 1459, which created the Syrian Federation on 28 June 1922

== Sources ==
- Annales des sciences politiques. 1924.
- Le Conte, René (5 May 1923). "Géographie administrative du Levant français". La Nature.
- Joffre, Alphonse (1924). Le mandat de la France sur la Syrie et le Grand-Liban.
- Sartre, Maurice; Sartre-Fauriat, Annie (12 May 2016). Palmyre. Place des éditeurs. ISBN 9782262067892.
- Rapport sur la situation de la Syrie et du Liban. 1925.
- Malsagne, Stéphane (2011). Fouad Chéhab, 1902-1973: une figure oubliée de l'histoire libanaise (in French). KARTHALA Editions. ISBN 9782811105167.
