= Syrian Constitution of 1930 =

Syrian constitution under the French Mandate

Constitution of the State of Syria
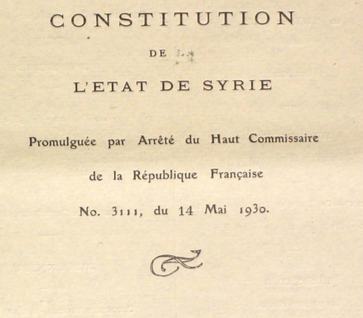

Overview
- Original title: دستور دولة سورية
- Jurisdiction: First Syrian Republic
- Presented: 11 August 1928
- Ratified: 14 May 1930
- Date effective: 21 January 1932
- System: Unitary parliamentary republic

Government structure
- Branches: Three (executive, legislative and judiciary)
- Head of state: President
- Chambers: Unicameral (Chamber of Deputies)
- Executive: President-led Council of Ministers responsible to the Chamber of Deputies; Prime Minister as head of government
- Judiciary: Supreme Court
- Federalism: Unitary
- First legislature: 7 June 1932
- Repealed: 29 March 1949
- Author: Constituent Assembly
- Superseded by: Provisional Constitution of 1949

Full text
- Constitution of Syria (1930) at Wikisource
- دستور دولة سورية at Arabic Wikisource

The Syrian Constitution of 1930, drafted by a committee under Ibrahim Hananu, was promulgated by arrêté No. 3111 of High Commissioner Ponsot. It was the founding constitution of the First Syrian Republic under the French Mandate.

On 25 March 1943, three arrêtés (Nos. 144, 146 & 154/FC) restored the constitution after it had been suspended in 1939 and provisionally regulated the organization of the executive and legislative powers, appointing different persons to exercise them pending elections which eventually took place on 10 and 26 July of the same year.

After the Syrian Republic's independence, the Constitution of 1930 was revised on the 20 March 1948:

Changes were made to Article 68, which granted the President of the Republic the possibility of being re-elected; to Articles 85 and 86, which regulated the procedure and the date of the elections; to Article 89, which determined the number of Ministers; and to Articles 71 and 115, which indicated the procedure for the election of the President of the Republic.

The constitution was replaced by the Syrian Constitution of 1950.
