= Taj al-Din al-Hasani =

French-appointed Syrian leader and politician

- تاج الدين الحسني
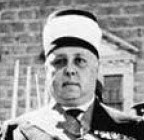

Head of State of Syria
- In office 16 September 1941 – 17 January 1943
- Prime Minister: Hassan al-Hakim; Husni al-Barazi
- Preceded by: Khalid al-Azm (acting)
- Succeeded by: Jamil al-Ulshi (acting)
- In office 15 February 1928 – 19 November 1931
- Preceded by: Ahmad Nami
- Succeeded by: Muhammad Ali Bey al-Abid

Prime Minister of Syria
- In office 16 March 1934 – 22 February 1936
- President: Muhammad Ali Bey al-Abid
- Preceded by: Haqqi al-Azm
- Succeeded by: Ata Bey al-Ayyubi
- In office 15 April 1928 – 19 November 1931
- Preceded by: Ahmad Nami
- Succeeded by: Haqqi al-Azm

Minister of Interior
- In office 11 May 1934 – 23 February 1936
- President: Muhammad Ali Bey al-Abid
- Preceded by: Haqqi al-Azm
- Succeeded by: Ata Bey al-Ayyubi

Personal details
- Born: 1885 Damascus, Syria Vilayet, Ottoman Empire
- Died: 17 January 1943 (aged 58) Damascus, Syrian Republic
- Spouse: Mousirra Midani
- Relatives: Munir al-Ajlani (son-in-law)

Taj al-Din al-Hasani (Arabic: تاج الدين الحسني, romanized: Tāj ad-Dīn al-Ḥasanī; 1885 – 17 January 1943) was a French-appointed Syrian leader and politician who served during the French mandate as Syrian head of state (1928–1931, 1941–1943), prime minister (1928–1932, 1934–1936) and minister of interior (1934–1936).

== Background, education and early career ==
Taj al-Din was born and raised into a family of Muslim scholars in Damascus. His father was Badr al-Din al-Hasani, one of the most respected Islamic scholars in the late nineteenth century. The young Hasani studied Islamic theology with his father Badr al-Din al-Hasani, and in 1905 became his personal assistant. He trained young students of his generation in conduct and thought. In 1912, he became a member in the committee for school reform, which was established by the Municipality of Damascus. In 1916, he became editor-in-chief of al-Sharq (The East), a daily newspaper published by Jamal Pasha, the Ottoman Governor of Syria. He held this position throughout World War I. When the war ended in 1918, his father delegated him to meet with King Faisal I, the first post-Ottoman ruler of Syria, and explain the conditions and needs of Muslim establishments in Syria. Faisal was impressed by Hasani's eloquence and, in March 1920, appointed him Director of the Royal Palace. He retained this post until the French occupied Syria in July 1920 and dethroned Faysal, setting up their mandate in Syria. Hasani went to Paris and established secret channels with the French, promising them absolute support if they agreed to support his political ambitions. The French government accepted and began grooming him for future leadership in Syria.

== Years in office ==
In 1925, the French High Commissioner Maurice Sarrail asked Hasani to form a government during the climax of a national uprising in the Arab Mountain. Hasani failed to create a suitable composition. He was given a second opportunity and succeeded, creating a government of prominent figures on 15 February 1928. With no presidential office in Syria, Hasani was vested with supreme presidential powers, but had to submit all of his actions and decrees to the French High Commissioner in Beirut. His cabinet included the historian and scholar Muhammad Kurd Ali as Minister of Education, the attorney Said Mahasin as Minister of Justice, and Jamil al-Ulshi, an Ottoman-trained officer and ex-prime minister, as Minister of Finance. The opponents to his regime were mainly hard-line nationalists who criticized the French connections of Ulshi, Mahasin, and Hasani, claiming that they had not contributed to the nationalist movement since the French Mandate was imposed in 1920. In April 1928, Hasani held office for three months on the Constituent Assembly that drafted the first republican constitution for Syria. Hasani ruled Syria with three different cabinets from February 1928 until November 1931. The opposition, headed by the National Bloc, accused him of tampering with the ballots to secure his election through Interior Minister Said Mahasin. In 1932, Hasani nominated himself for presidential office. The French, who were under mounting nationalist pressure to reform the political system in Syria, distanced themselves from the elections. With no proper French backing, he was defeated at the polls.

Hasani protested to government authorities in Paris, who compensated him with the post of Prime Minister in the administration of President Muhammad Ali al-Abid. The National Bloc, Hasani's prime opponent in local politics, staged a countrywide strike that lasted for sixty days, demanding that France address the issue of Syrian independence in a serious manner. During the strike, commercial life was brought to a standstill and hundreds of Syrians were arrested and deported to remote prisons on the Syrian-Turkish border. Hasani arrested many leaders of the National Bloc, including Saadallah al-Jabiri from Aleppo and Fakhri al-Barudi from Damascus. Shukri al-Quwwatli and Nasib al-Bakri, two politicians from Damascus, were placed under house-arrest. The entire ordeal embarrassed the French who in turn, called the Bloc leaders into independence talks in Paris. When a Franco-Syrian treaty was ready, the Bloc leadership assumed power and Hasani moved into the opposition to the new administration of President Hashim al-Atasi, the leader of the National Bloc.

== Final years ==
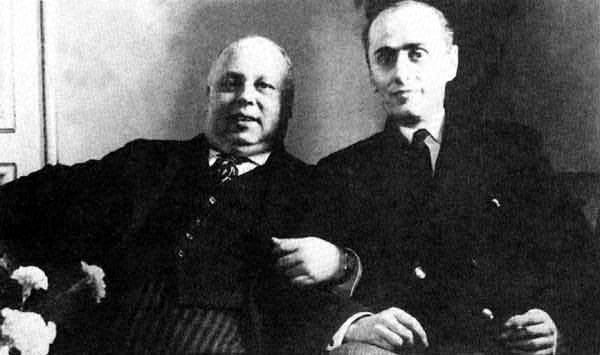
Taj al-Din al-Hasani (left) with President Alfred Naqqache of Lebanon in 1941

The ex-Prime Minister remained on the margins of political life until 1941, when following the Bloc downfall, General Charles de Gaulle appointed him President of Syria on 12 September 1941, after having failed to prevail upon Hashim al-Atasi to return to office. He was required to contain the nationalist movement and provide funds for France's war effort in Europe. To raise money, President Hasani increased his taxes and raised the price of bread, thereby alienating himself throughout the poor districts of Syria. De Gaulle rewarded Hasani's services by officially recognizing Syria's independence on 27 September 1941 and promising complete French evacuation once the war in Europe ended. The French General abrogated a law formulated in the 1920s that divided the Alawite Mountain and the Arab Mountain into independent zones, thereby re-incorporating them into the Syrian Republic. France, however, was given the right to retain military bases throughout the country and receive economic, financial, and political privileges in Syria. Hasani then tried to distance himself from French influence and began befriending members of the National Bloc. He also tried to convince the French to re-instate the democratically elected Parliament of 1936–1939, but his efforts proved futile. He died suddenly of a heart attack on 17 January 1943. His son-in-law Munir al-Ajlani claims that in his final years, Taj al-Din al-Hasani wanted to distance himself from the French and project the image of a true nationalist, but died before that was done. He was the first Syrian head of state to die while in office.

== Distinctions ==
- Commander of the Legion of Honour (1934)

== Sources ==
- Sami Moubayed, Steel & Silk: Men and Women Who Shaped Syria 1900–2000 (Cune Press, Seattle, 2005).
