= Subhi Bey Barakat =

President of Syria from 1922 to 1925

- صبحي بك بركات
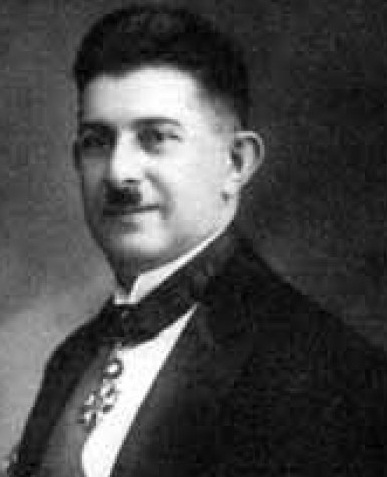
- Official portrait, c. 1922

President of Syria
- In office 29 June 1922 – 21 December 1925
- Prime Minister: Himself
- Preceded by: Office established; Faisal I (As King of Syria)
- Succeeded by: François Pierre-Alype (acting); Ahmad Nami

Prime Minister of Syria
- In office 29 June 1922 – 21 December 1925
- President: Himself
- Preceded by: Jamil al-Ulshi
- Succeeded by: Ahmad Nami

Personal details
- Born: Suphi Bereket; 1889 Antakya, Ottoman Empire
- Died: 1939 (aged 49–50) Antakya, Turkey
- Party: Independent

Subhi Bey Barakat al-Khalidi (Arabic: صبحي بك بركات الخالدي; Turkish: Suphi Bereket; 1889–1939) was a Turkish-born Syrian politician who served as the first president of Syria from 1922 until his resignation in 1925. He served during the French Mandate where the French controlled the country. He also served as the fourth prime minister during his tenure as president.

Part of the reason the French supported his candidacy as president of the Syrian Federation was because as neither a native of Damascus nor a very strong Arabic speaker (Turkish was his mother tongue), he did not seem to pose a nationalist threat to the French regime.

Initially, he was a partner of Ibrahim Hanano in his revolt. He played a major role in merging the States of Aleppo and Damascus into one state, and he quit the presidency of Syria in 1925 in protest to the French position regarding the fate of the Alawite and Druze States, which France refused to add to Syria because it feared that might endanger the independence of the newly created Lebanon.

== Personal life ==
Barakat was married to Halide; They had three sons (named Rıfat, Halit, and Selahattin) and three daughters (Süheyla Mukbile, Zehra, and Saniye). Süheyla Mukbile married Refik Koraltan's son Oğuzhan Koraltan. Zehra married Turkish diplomat Vahit Melih Halefoğlu. Saniye married to Turkish businessman Fazıl Tüzemen.

== See also ==
- Mandate for Syria and Lebanon
- Hatay State
