= History of Syria =

The history of Syria covers events which occurred on the territory of the Syrian Arab Republic and in the region of Syria. The territory of the Syrian Arab Republic was occupied and ruled by several empires, including the Sumerians, Egyptians, Amorites, Ugarites, Hittites, Mitanni, Assyrians, Babylonians, Canaanites, Phoenicians, Arameans, Persians, Greeks and Romans. Syria is considered to have emerged as an independent country for the first time on 24 October 1945, upon the signing of the United Nations Charter by the Syrian government, effectively ending France's mandate by the League of Nations to "render administrative advice and assistance to the population" of Syria, which came in effect in April 1946.

On 21 February 1958, Syria merged with Egypt to create the United Arab Republic after plebiscitary ratification of the merger by voters in both countries, but seceded from it in 1961, thereby recovering its full independence. From 1963 until 2024, the Syrian Arab Republic was ruled by the Ba’ath Party, with the Assad family exclusively in power since 1971. Following the fall of the Assad regime, Syria entered a political transition under the transitional government on 29 March 2025.

== Prehistory ==
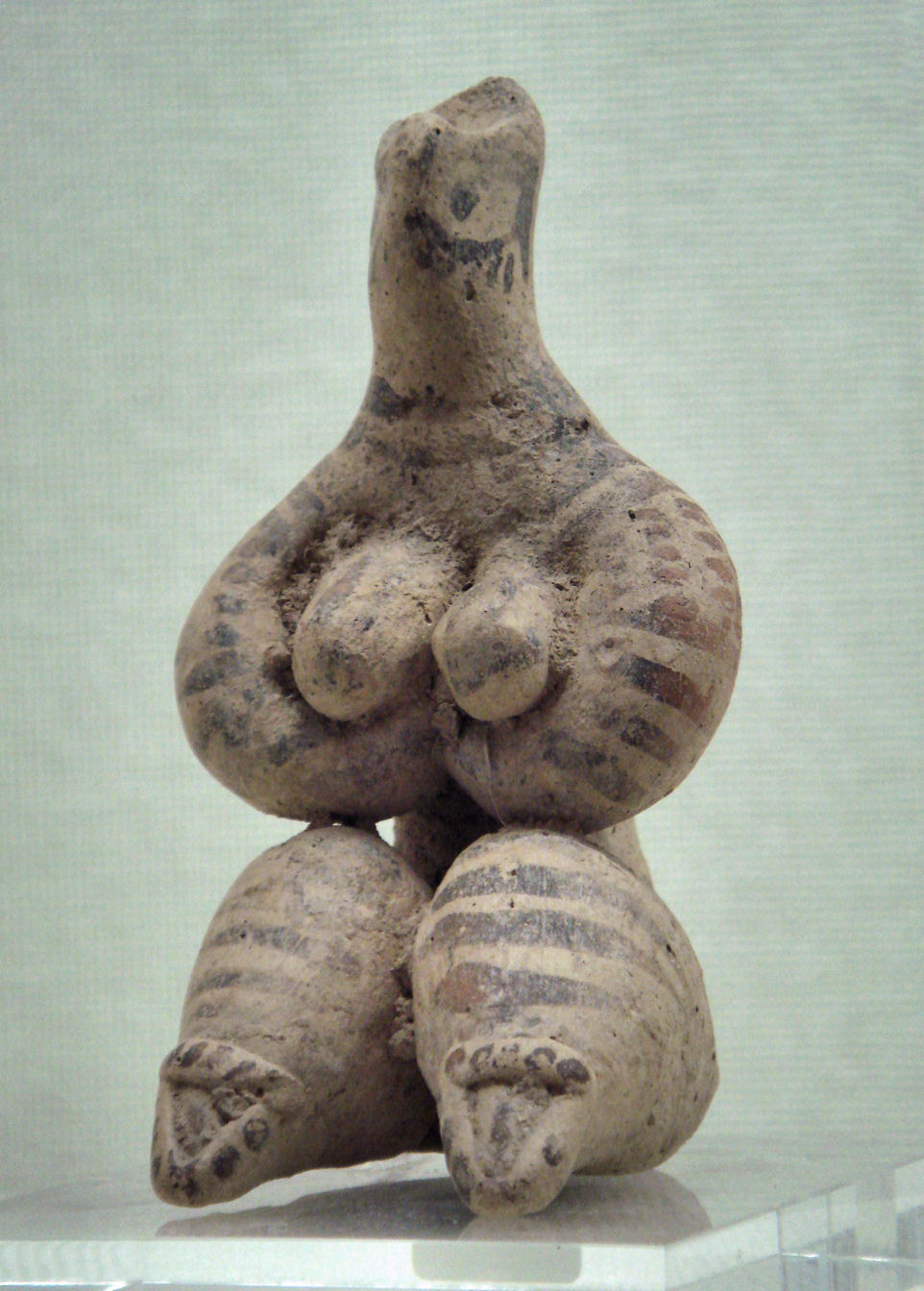
Female figurine, Syria, 5000 BCE

The oldest remains found in Syria date from the Palaeolithic era (c.800,000 BCE). On 23 August 1993, a joint Japan-Syria excavation team discovered fossilized Paleolithic human remains at the Dederiyeh Cave some 400 km north of Damascus. The bones found in this massive cave were those of a Neanderthal child, estimated to have been about two years old, who lived in the Middle Palaeolithic era (ca. 200,000 to 40,000 years ago). Although many Neanderthal bones had been discovered already, this was practically the first time that an almost complete child's skeleton had been found in its original burial state.

Archaeologists have demonstrated that civilization in Syria was one of the most ancient on earth. Syria is part of the Fertile Crescent, and since approximately 10,000 BCE it was one of the centers of Neolithic culture (PPNA) where agriculture and cattle breeding appeared for the first time in the world. The Neolithic period (PPNB) is represented by rectangular houses of the Mureybet culture. In the early Neolithic period, people used vessels made of stone, gyps and burnt lime. Finds of obsidian tools from Anatolia are evidence of early trade relations. The cities of Hamoukar and Emar flourished during the late Neolithic and Bronze Age.

== Ancient Near East ==
The ruins of Ebla, near Idlib in northern Syria, were discovered and excavated in 1975. Ebla appears to have been an East Semitic speaking city-state founded around 3000 BCE. At its zenith, from about 2500 to 2400 BCE, it may have controlled an empire reaching north to Anatolia, east to Mesopotamia and south to Damascus. Ebla traded with the Mesopotamian states of Sumer, Akkad and Assyria, as well as with peoples to the northwest. Gifts from Pharaohs, found during excavations, confirm Ebla's contact with Egypt. Scholars believe the language of Ebla was closely related to the fellow East Semitic Akkadian language of Mesopotamia and to be among the oldest known written languages.

From the third millennium BCE, Syria was occupied and fought over successively by Sumerians, Eblaites, Akkadians, Assyrians, Egyptians, Hittites, Hurrians, Mitanni, Amorites and Babylonians.

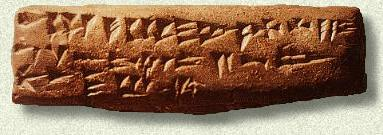
The world's first alphabet from the ancient city-state of Ugarit, northern Syria. 15th century BCE.

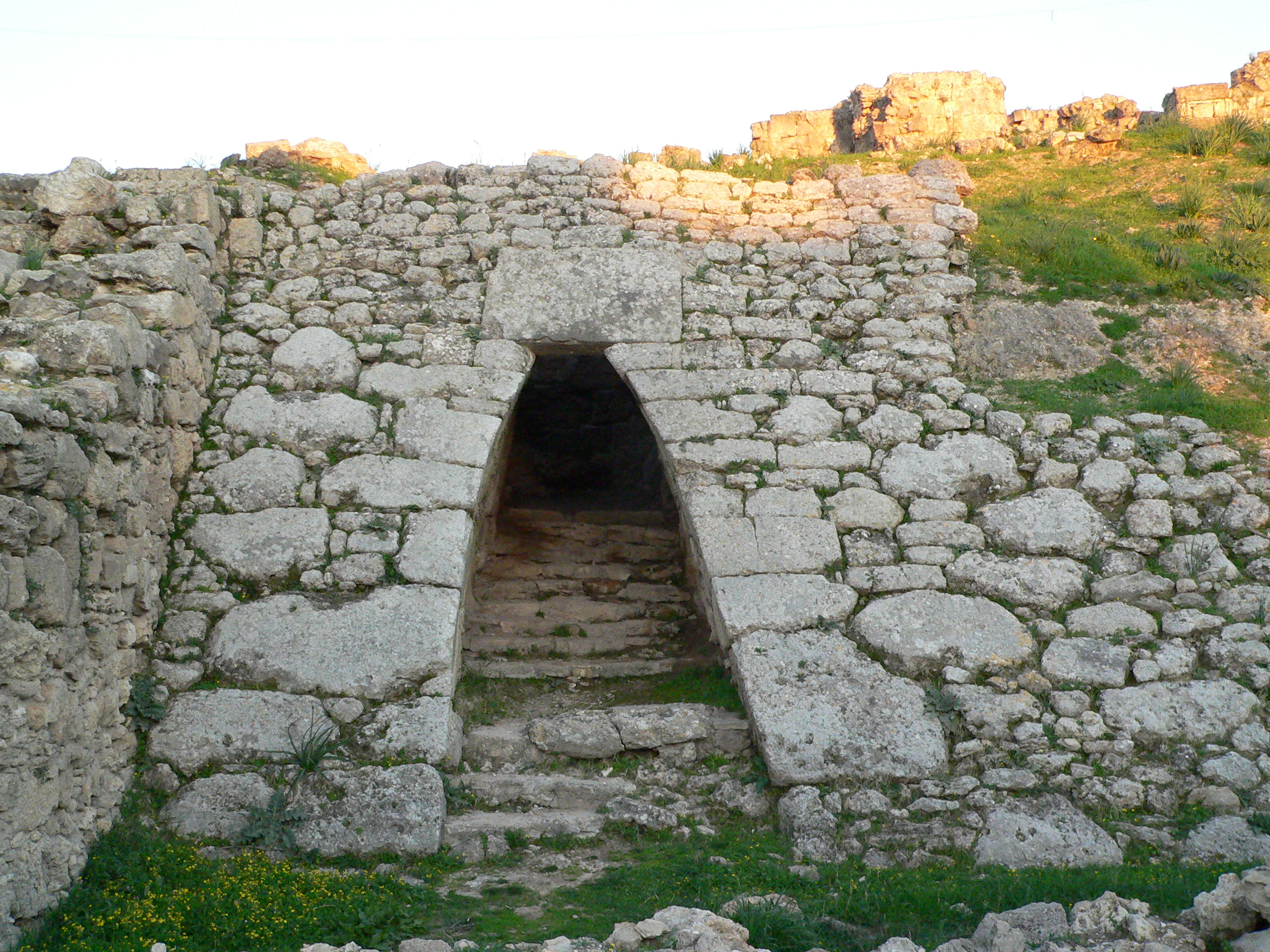
The ancient city of Ugarit

Ebla was probably conquered into the Mesopotamian Akkadian Empire (2335–2154 BCE) by Sargon of Akkad around 2330 BCE. The city re-emerged, as the part of the nation of the Northwest Semitic speaking Amorites, a few centuries later, and flourished through the early second millennium BCE until conquered by the Indo-European Hittites. The Sumerians, Akkadians and Assyrians of Mesopotamia referred to the region as Mar.Tu or The land of the Amurru (Amorites) from as early as the 24th century BCE.

Parts of Syria were controlled by the Neo-Sumerian Empire, Old Assyrian Empire and Babylonian Empire between the 22nd and 18th centuries BCE.

The region was fought over by the rival empires of the Hittites, Egyptians, Assyrians and Mitanni between the 15th and 13th centuries BCE, with the Middle Assyrian Empire (1365–1050 BCE) eventually left controlling Syria.

When the Middle Assyrian Empire began to deteriorate in the late 11th century BCE, Canaanites and Phoenicians came to the fore and occupied the coast, and Arameans and Suteans supplanted the Amorites in the interior, as part of the general disruptions and exchanges associated with the Bronze Age Collapse and the Sea Peoples. During this period the bulk of Syria became known as Eber Nari and Aramea.

From the 10th century BCE the Neo-Assyrian Empire (935–605 BCE) arose, and Syria was ruled by Assyria for the next three centuries, until the late 7th century BCE, and was still known as Eber-Nari and Aram throughout the period. It is from this period that the name Syria first emerges, but not in relation to modern Syria, but as an Indo-European corruption of Assyria, which in fact encompassed the modern regions of northern Iraq, north east Syria, south east Turkey and the northwestern fringe of Iran. (see Etymology of Syria)

After this empire finally collapsed, Mesopotamian dominance continued for a time with the short lived Neo-Babylonian Empire (612–539 BCE), which ruled the region for almost 75 years.

== Classical antiquity ==
=== Persian Syria ===
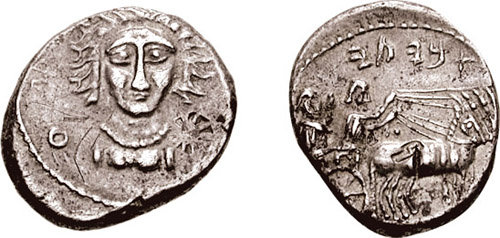
Coin of Bambyce, c. 340–332 BC

In 539 BCE, Cyrus the Great, King of Achaemenid Persians, took Syria as part of his empire. Due to Syria's location on the Eastern Mediterranean coast, its navy fleet, and abundant forests, Persians showed great interest in easing control while governing the region. Thus, the indigenous Phoenicians paid an annual tribute of only 350 talent compared to Egypt's tribute of 700 talents. Furthermore, Syrians were allowed to rule their own cities, in that they continued to practice their native religions, establish their own businesses, and build colonies all over the Mediterranean coast. Syria's satraps used to reside in Damascus, Sidon or Tripoli.

In 525 BCE, Cambyses II managed to conquer Egypt after the Battle of Pelusium. Afterwards, he decided to launch an expedition towards Siwa Oasis and Carthage, but his efforts were in vain as Phoenicians refused to operate against their kindred.

Later on, Phoenicians contributed dearly to Xerxes I's invasion of Greece. Arwad aided the campaign with its fleet, while land troops helped in constructing a bridge for Xerxes's army to cross the Bosphorus into mainland Greece.

During Artaxerxes III's reign (358-338 BCE), Sidon, Egyptians, and eleven other Phoenician cities started to revolt against the Persian rulers. The revolutions were heavily suppressed in that Sidon was burnt with its citizens.

=== Hellenistic Syria ===
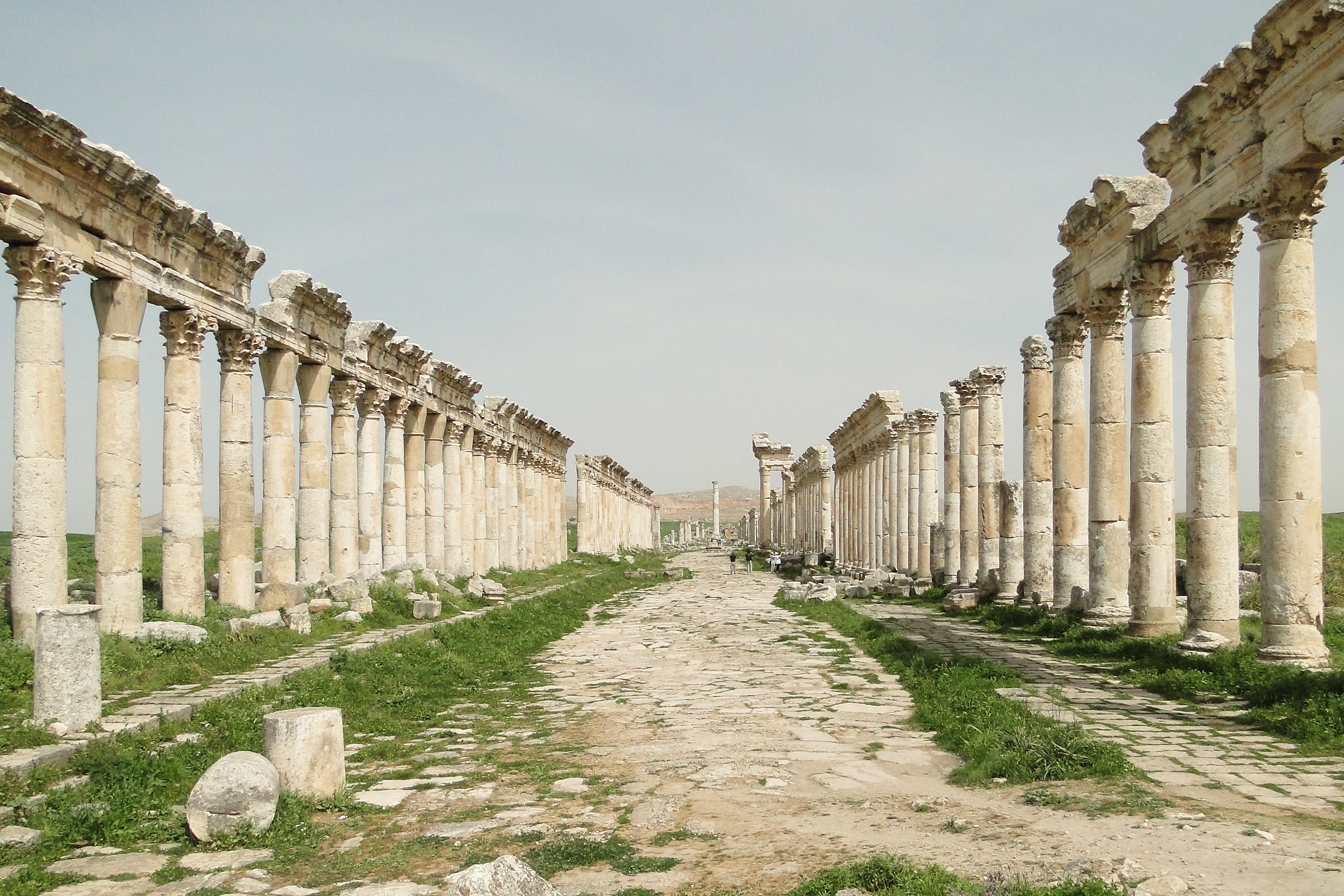
The Ancient city of Apamea, Syria, one of Syria's most important commercial centres in Hellenistic times

Persian dominion ended with the conquests of the Macedonian Greek king, Alexander the Great in 333–332 BCE after the Battle of Issus which took place south of the ancient town Issus, close to the present-day Turkish town of Iskenderun. Syria was then incorporated into the Seleucid Empire by general Seleucus who started, with the Seleucid Kings after him, using the title of King of Syria. The capital of this Empire (founded in 312 BCE) was situated at Antioch, then a part of historical Syria, but just inside the Turkish border today as well.

A series of six wars, Syrian Wars, were fought between the Seleucid Empire and the Ptolemaic Kingdom of Egypt, during the 3rd and 2nd centuries BCE over the region then called Coele-Syria, one of the few avenues into Egypt. These conflicts drained the material and manpower of both parties and led to their eventual destruction and conquest by Rome and Parthia. Mithridates II, King of Parthian Empire, extended his control further west, occupying Dura-Europos in 113 BCE.

By 100 BCE, the once formidable Seleucid Empire encompassed little more than Antioch and some Syrian cities. In 83 BCE, after a bloody strife for the throne of Syria, governed by the Seleucids, the Syrians decided to choose Tigranes the Great, King of Armenia, as the protector of their kingdom and offered him the crown of Syria.

=== Roman Syria ===
Parts of Syria and neighbouring countries formed a part of the Roman Empire

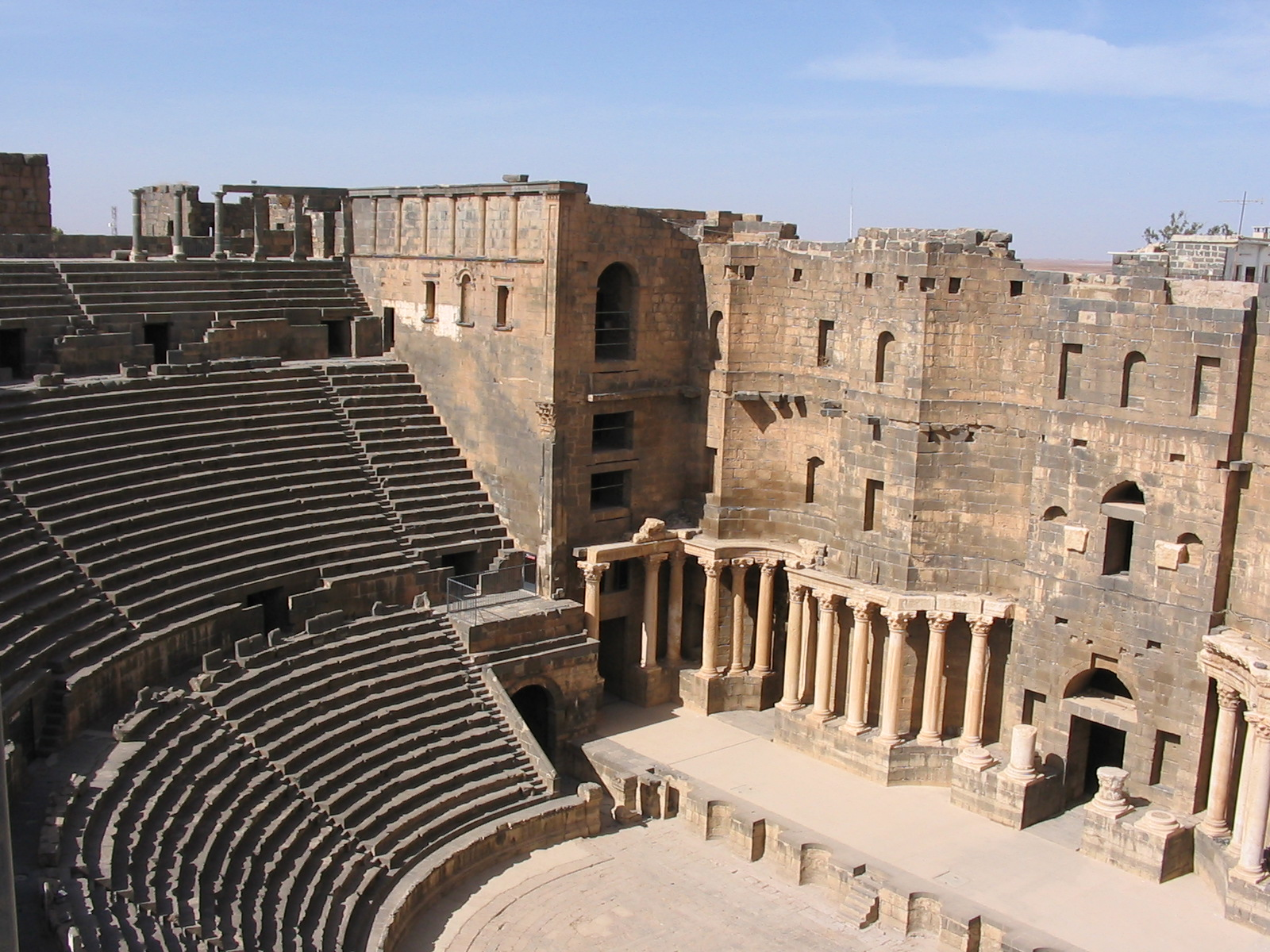
Roman theatre at Bosra, considered to be one of the World's best preserved Roman Theatres.

The Roman general Pompey the Great captured Antioch in 64 BCE, turning Syria into a Roman province and ended Armenian rule, establishing the city of Antioch as its capital.

Antioch was the third largest city in the Roman Empire, after Rome and Alexandria, with an estimated population of 500,000 at its zenith, and being a commercial and cultural hub at the region for many centuries later. The largely Aramaic-speaking population of Syria during the heyday of the empire was probably not exceeded again until the 19th century. Syria's large and prosperous population made it one of the most important Roman provinces, particularly during the 2nd and 3rd centuries CE. In the course of the second century AD, the cities of Palmyra and neighboring Emesa (modern-day Homs) rose to wealth and prominence and both would be notably active in the third century, both in resisting the Parthian Empire but also in raising up Roman usurpers.

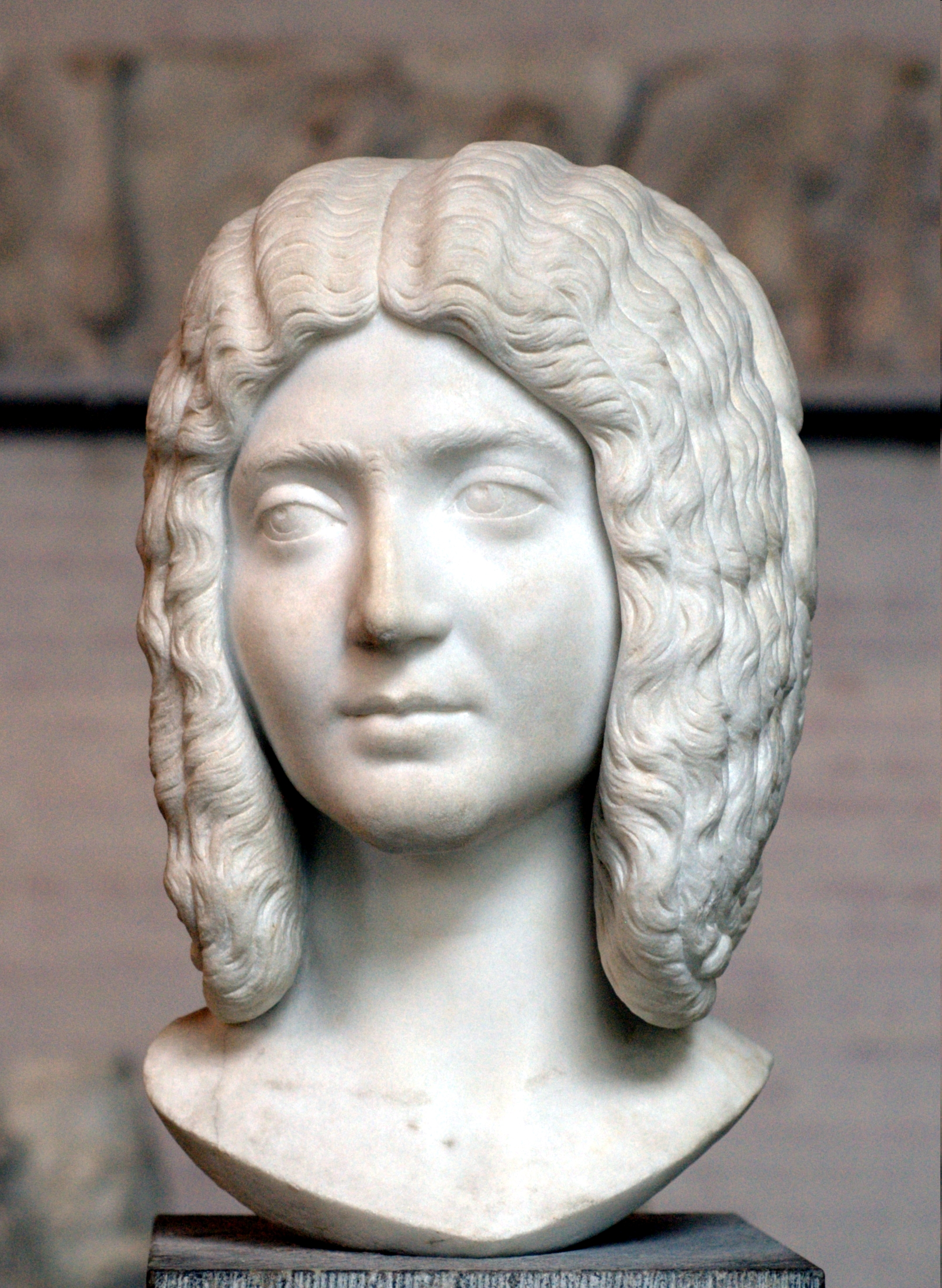
Empress Julia Domna

Under the Severan dynasty, Syrian nobles administered Rome and even rose to imperial title, such as the matriarch of the family, Julia Domna, who descended from the Emesan dynasty of priest-kings of Elagabalus and who married Septimius Severus in 187. After the ascension of Domna's two sons to the throne and their eventual death, the Severan dynasty was usurped by Macrinus, a prominent figure in Roman court and a Praetorian prefect. Domna's sister Julia Maesa returned to Emesa, taking her enormous wealth, and her two daughters and grandsons with her. Back in Emesa, her grandson, Elagabalus. Soldiers from Legio III Gallica who were stationed near Emesa would visit the city occasionally, and were persuaded to swear fealty to Elagabalus by Maesa who used her enormous wealth and claimed that he was Caracalla's bastard. Elagabalus later rode to battle against Marcinus, and entered the city of Antioch emerging as emperor, with Marcinus fleeing before being captured near Chalcedon and executed in Cappadocia. Whatsoever, his reign lasted only a short 4 years, filled with sex scandals, eccentricity, decadence, and zealotry. Realizing that the popular support for the emperor was fading, Julia Maesa decided to replace him with her younger grandson, his cousin Severus Alexander, and convinced Elagabalus to name him as his heir and give him the title of Caesar, but after revoking his far more popular cousin of his titles and ranks, and reversing his consulships, the Praetorian guard cheered on Alexander, naming him emperor and slaying Elagabalus and his mother. Severus Alexander's rule was longer, and unlike Elagabalus' disastrous rule, was filled with domestic achievements and he earned the popularity and respect of his people, something Elagabalus never had. He ruled for 13 years, before eventually losing the popularity he once had and being slain by the Legio XXII Primigenia.

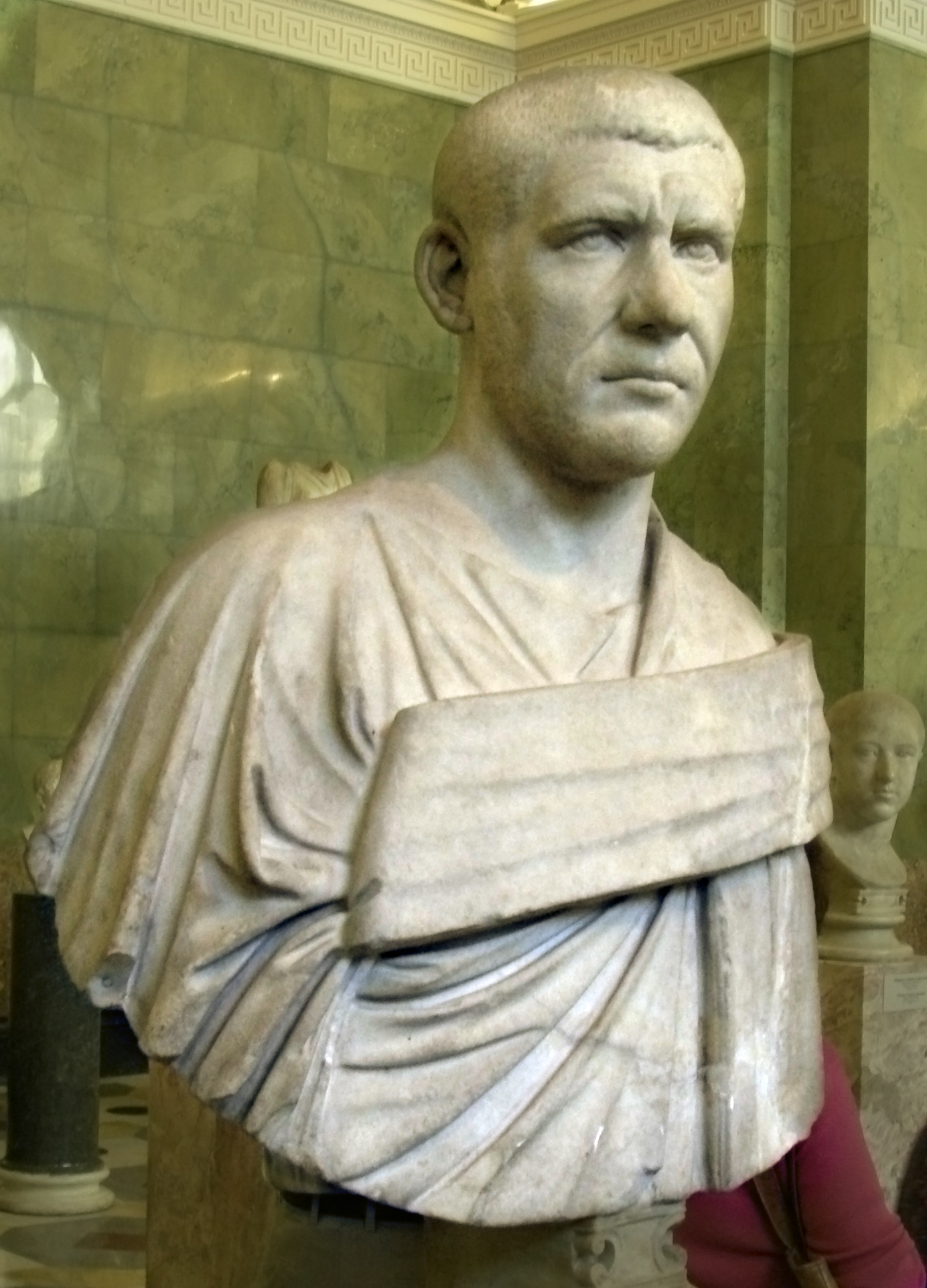
Philip the Arab, Roman Emperor

Another Emperor of Syrian origin was Philip the Arab, born in modern-day Shahba, he reigned from 244 to 249. His reign enjoyed relative stability, he maintained good relations with the senate, reaffirmed old Roman virtues and traditions, and started many building projects, most popularly in his hometown, renaming it Philippopolis, and raising it to civic status. Whatsoever, the creation of a new city, alongside the massive tribute to the Persians, he had to raise taxes to high levels and stop paying subsidies to the tribes north of the Danube, which were essential to keeping the peace with them. Nonetheless, his reign ended shortly after Decius usurped the throne, killing Philip and emerging as the new emperor.

During the Roman–Sasanian war of the 3rd century, the Romans, struggling in the early stages of the Crisis of the Third Century depended on Odaenathus, the King of the Syrian city-state of Palmyra to secure the Roman East from the Persian invaders and to regain lost Roman territories, so Odaenathus rode north leading the Palmyrene army, and regained Armenia, Northern Syria, parts of Asia Minor from the Persians, and even reached the Persian capital of Ctesiphon, thus weakening the Persians and securing the Roman East, before he was murdered by his own nephew, Maeonius.

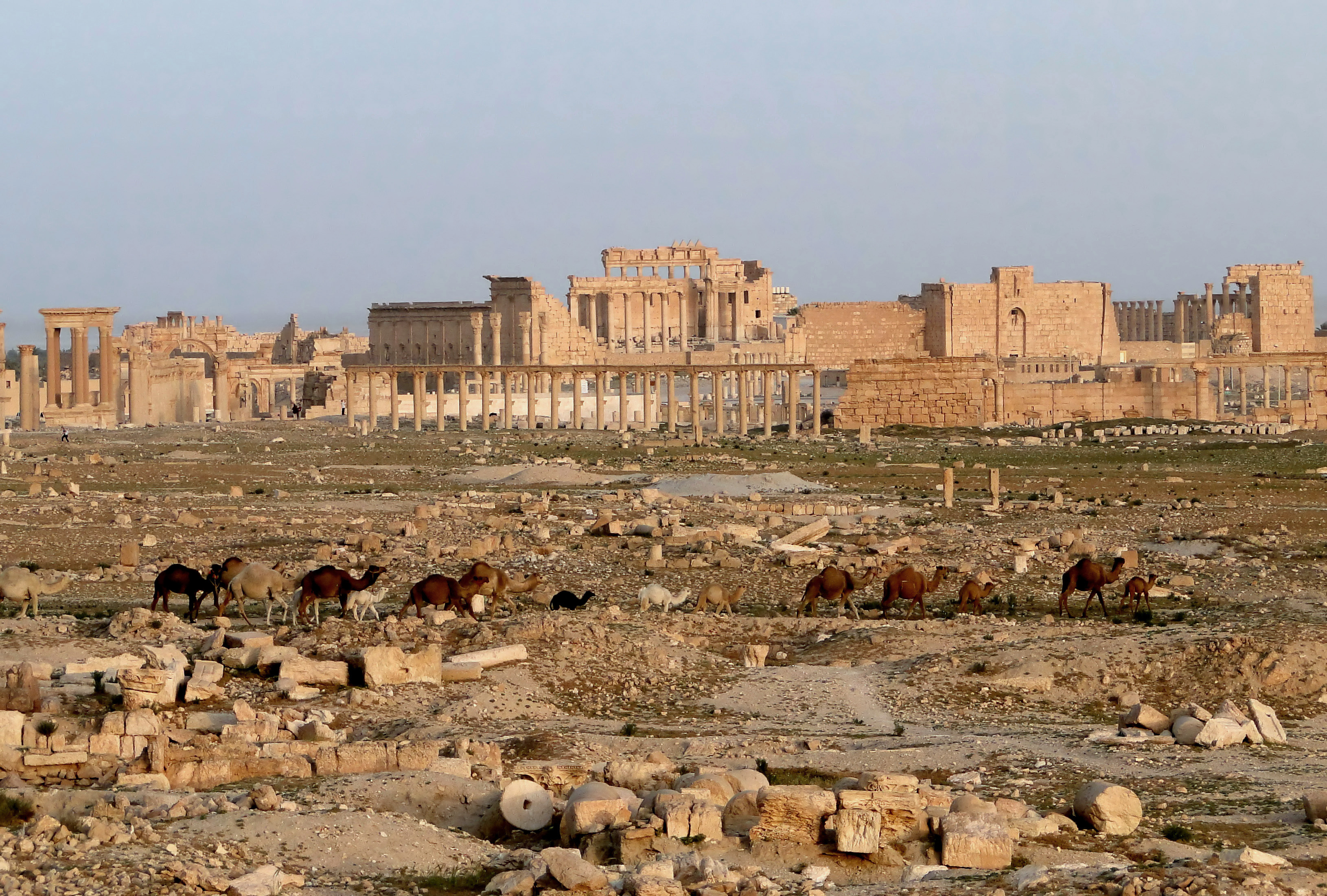
Palmyra, one of Roman Syria's most prospering cities

Years later, Palmyra rose in rebellion against the Roman Empire under the leadership of Zenobia, Odaenathus' widow and Queen Mother of Palmyra, who led her armies to conquer Syria, Asia Minor, Arabia and Lower Egypt in a series of campaigns in which she annexed almost the entire Roman east, all while the Roman Empire was struggling during the Crisis of the Third Century, ruled by incompetent emperors and torn apart by civil war. Whatsoever, the Palmyrene Empire was short lived; once the Roman general Aurelian rose to power, he rode east, defeated Queen Zenobia in battle twice, and rode to Palmyra to reconquer it and subsequently sacked it around 273 CE, which effectively put an end to Palmyrene civilization.

==== Byzantine period (395-636/37) ====
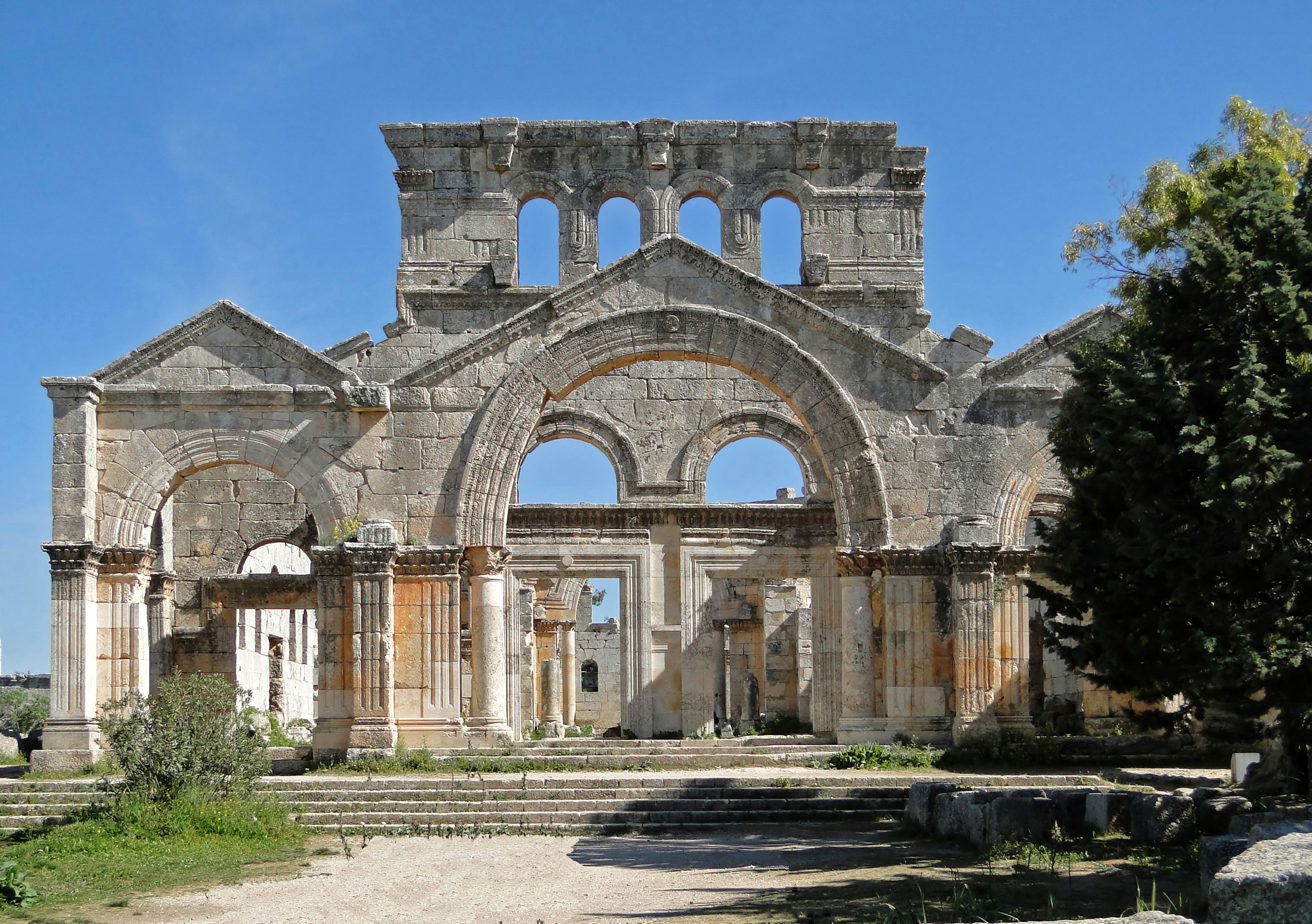
The Church of Saint Simeon Stylites near Aleppo

With the decline of the empire in the west, Syria became part of the Eastern Roman, or Byzantine, Empire in 395. The province was subsequently divided into three, smaller provinces. Syria Prima, with the capital remaining at Antioch, and Syria Secunda, with its capital moving to Apamea on the Orontes, and the new province of Theodorias, with Laodicea as its capital. By then the empire had converted to Christianity, in the history of which Syria had played a significant role; Paul the Apostle had converted on the Road to Damascus and emerged as a significant figure in the Church of Antioch.

Syria remained one of the most important regions of the Byzantine Empire, and was of strategic importance, being occupied by the Sasanians between 609 and 628, then recovered by the emperor Heraclius. Byzantine rule in the region was lost to the Muslims after the Battle of Yarmouk and the fall of Antioch.

== Medieval era ==
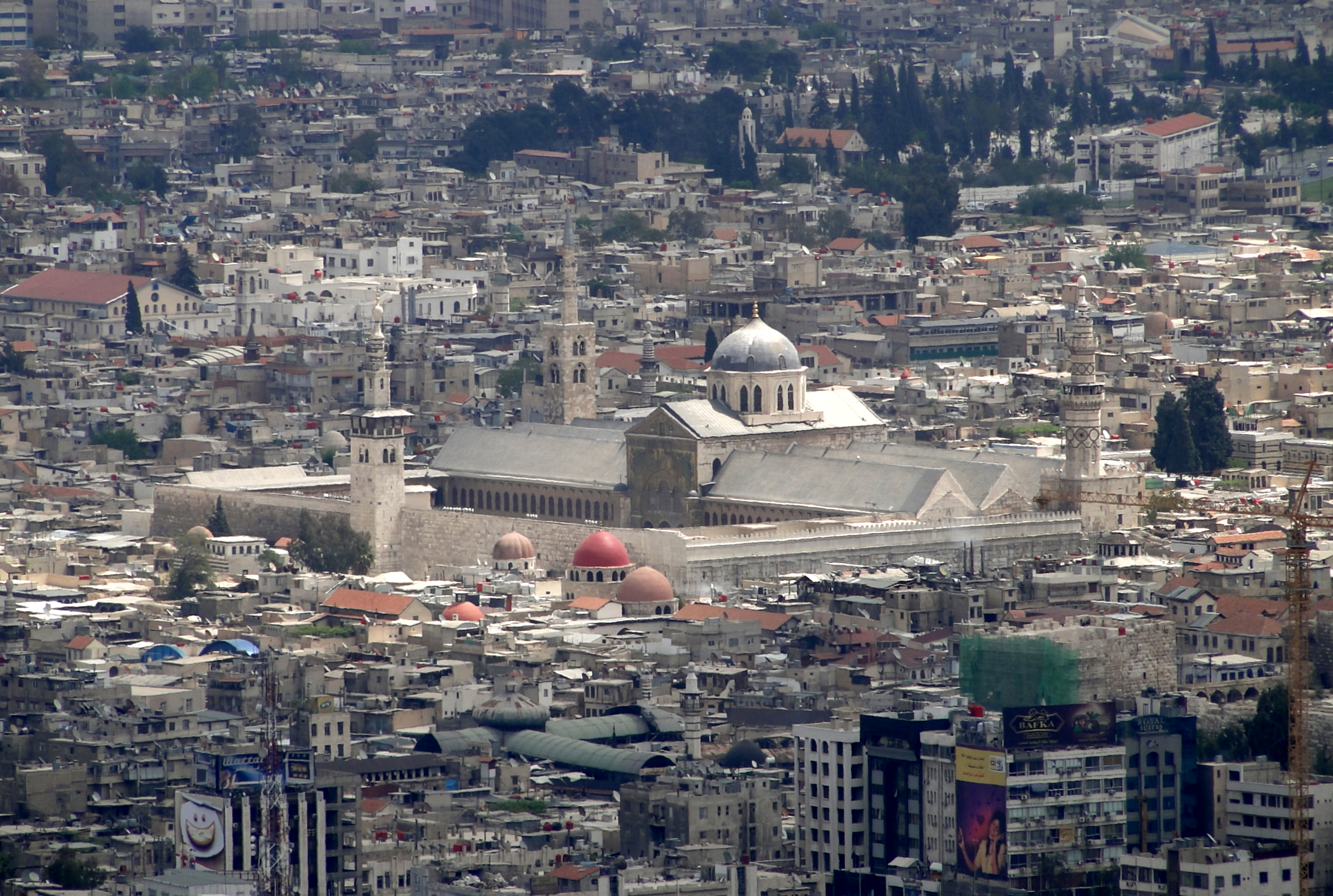
Umayyad Mosque

In 634–640, Syria was conquered by the Muslim Arabs in the form of the Rashidun army led by Khalid ibn al-Walid, resulting in the region becoming part of the Islamic empire. In the mid-7th century, the Umayyad dynasty, then rulers of the empire, placed the capital of the empire in Damascus. Syria was divided into four districts: Damascus, Homs, Palestine and Jordan. The Islamic empire expanded rapidly and at its height stretched from Spain to India and parts of Central Asia; thus Syria prospered economically, being the centre of the empire. Early Umayyad rulers such as Abd al-Malik and Al-Walid I constructed several splendid palaces and mosques throughout Syria, particularly in Damascus, Aleppo and Homs.

There were Christians (mostly ethnic Assyrians) in this era that held several governmental posts. In the mid-8th century, the Caliphate collapsed amid dynastic struggles, regional revolts and religious disputes. The Umayyad dynasty was overthrown by the Abbasid dynasty in 750, who moved the capital of empire to Baghdad. Arabic — made official under Umayyad rule – became the dominant language, replacing Greek and Aramaic in the Abbasid era. For periods, Syria was ruled from Egypt, under the Tulunids (887–905), and then, after a period of anarchy, the Ikhshidids (941–969). Northern Syria came under the Hamdanids of Aleppo.

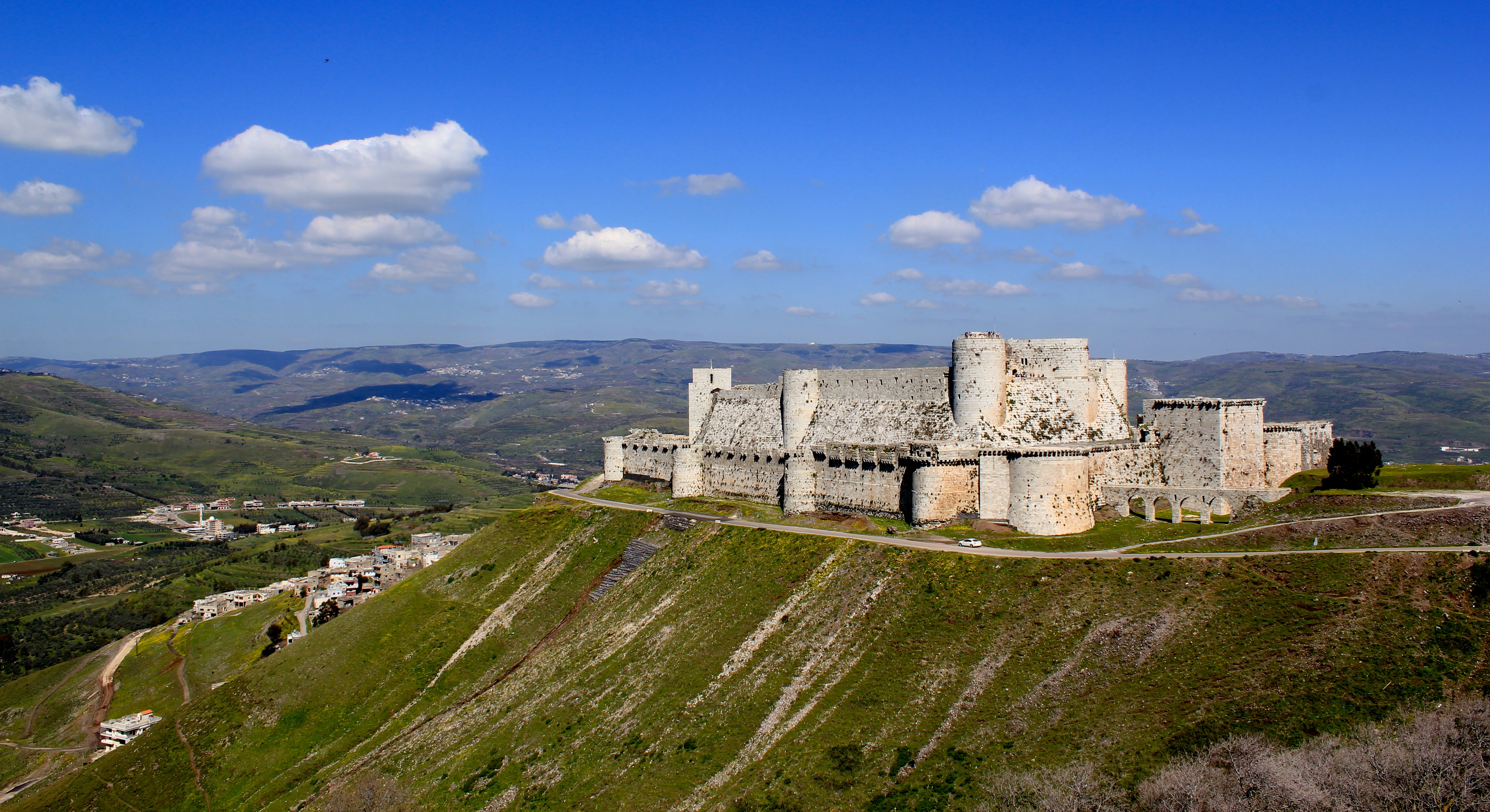
Krak des Chevaliers from the South-West

The court of Saif al-Daula (944–967) was a center of culture, thanks to its nurturing of Arabic literature. He resisted Byzantine efforts to reconquer Syria by skillful defensive tactics and counter-raids into Anatolia. After his death, the Byzantines captured Antioch and Aleppo (969). Syria was then in turmoil as a battleground between the Hamdanids, Byzantines and Damascus-based Fatimids. The Byzantines had conquered all of Syria by 996, but the chaos continued for much of the 11th century as the Byzantines, Fatimids and Buyids of Baghdad engaged in a struggle for supremacy. Syria was then conquered by the Seljuk Turks (1084–1086), during the reign of Malik-Shah I. Afterward, Nur ad-Din of the Zengid dynasty controlled the region between Aleppo and Damascus in 1154, taken from the Burid dynasty. Later on, Syria was conquered (1175–1185) by Saladin, founder of the Ayyubid dynasty of Egypt.

During the 12th–13th centuries, parts of Syria were held by Crusader states: the County of Edessa (1098–1149), the Principality of Antioch (1098–1268) and County of Tripoli (1109–1289). The area was also threatened by Shi'a extremists known as Assassins (Hassassin) and in 1260 the Mongols briefly swept through Syria. The withdrawal of the main Mongol army prompted the Mamluks of Egypt to invade and conquer Syria. In addition to the sultanate's capital in Cairo, the Mamluk leader, Baibars, made Damascus a provincial capital, with the cities linked by a mail service that traveled by both horses and carrier pigeons. The Mamluks eliminated the last of the Crusader footholds in Syria and repulsed several Mongol invasions.

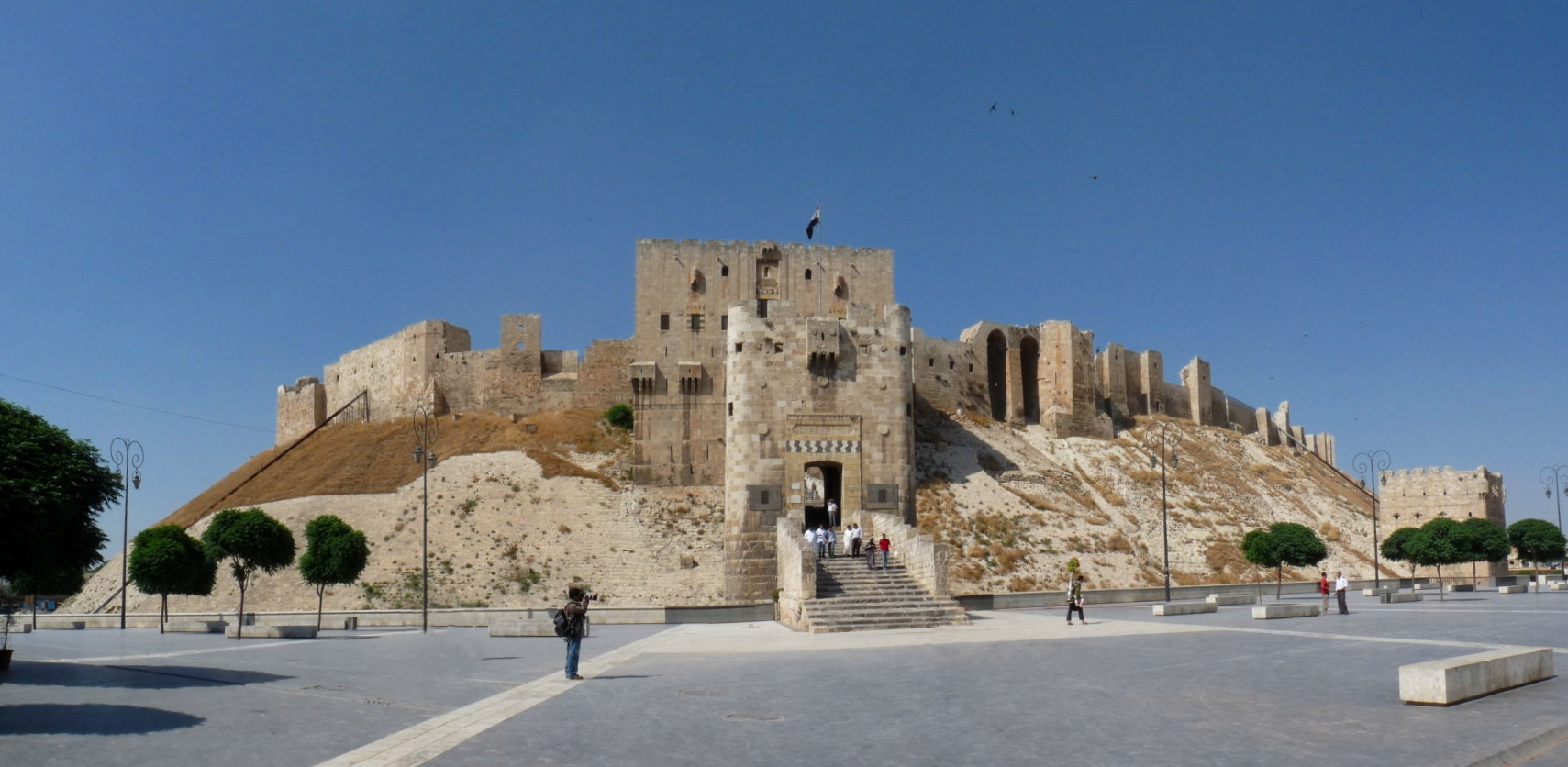
Citadel of Aleppo

In 1400, Timur Lenk, or Tamerlane, invaded Syria, defeated the Mamluk army at Aleppo and captured Damascus. Many of the city's inhabitants were massacred, except for the artisans, who were deported to Samarkand. At this time the Christian population of Syria suffered persecution.

By the end of the 15th century, the discovery of a sea route from Europe to the Far East ended the need for an overland trade route through Syria. In 1516, the Ottoman Empire conquered Syria.

== Ottoman era ==
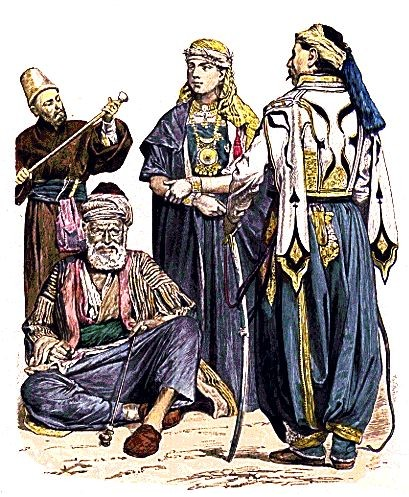
Ottoman-Syrian dress in the 19th century.

Ottoman Syria, circa 1683 (See: list of territories)

Ottoman Sultan Selim I conquered most of Syria in 1516 after defeating the Mamlukes at the Battle of Marj Dabiq near Aleppo. Syria was part of the Ottoman Empire from 1516 to 1918, although with 2 brief captures by the Iranian Safavids, notably under Shah Ismail I and Shah Abbas. Ottoman rule was not burdensome to the Syrians because the Turks, as Muslims, respected Arabic as the language of the Koran, and accepted the mantle of defenders of the faith. Damascus became the major entrepot for Mecca, and as such it acquired a holy character to Muslims, because of the barakah (spiritual force or blessing) of the countless pilgrims who passed through on the hadj, the pilgrimage to Mecca.

The Ottoman Turks reorganized Syria into one large province or eyalet. The eyalet was subdivided into several districts or sanjaks. In 1549, Syria was reorganized into two eyalets; the Eyalet of Damascus and the new Eyalet of Aleppo. In 1579, the Eyalet of Tripoli which included Latakia, Hama and Homs was established. In 1586, the Eyalet of Raqqa was established in eastern Syria. Ottoman administration did not foster a peaceful co-existence amongst the different sections of Syrian society but Each religious minority – Shia Muslim, Greek Orthodox, Maronite, Armenian, and Jewish – constituted a millet. The religious heads of each community administered all personal status law and performed certain civil functions as well.

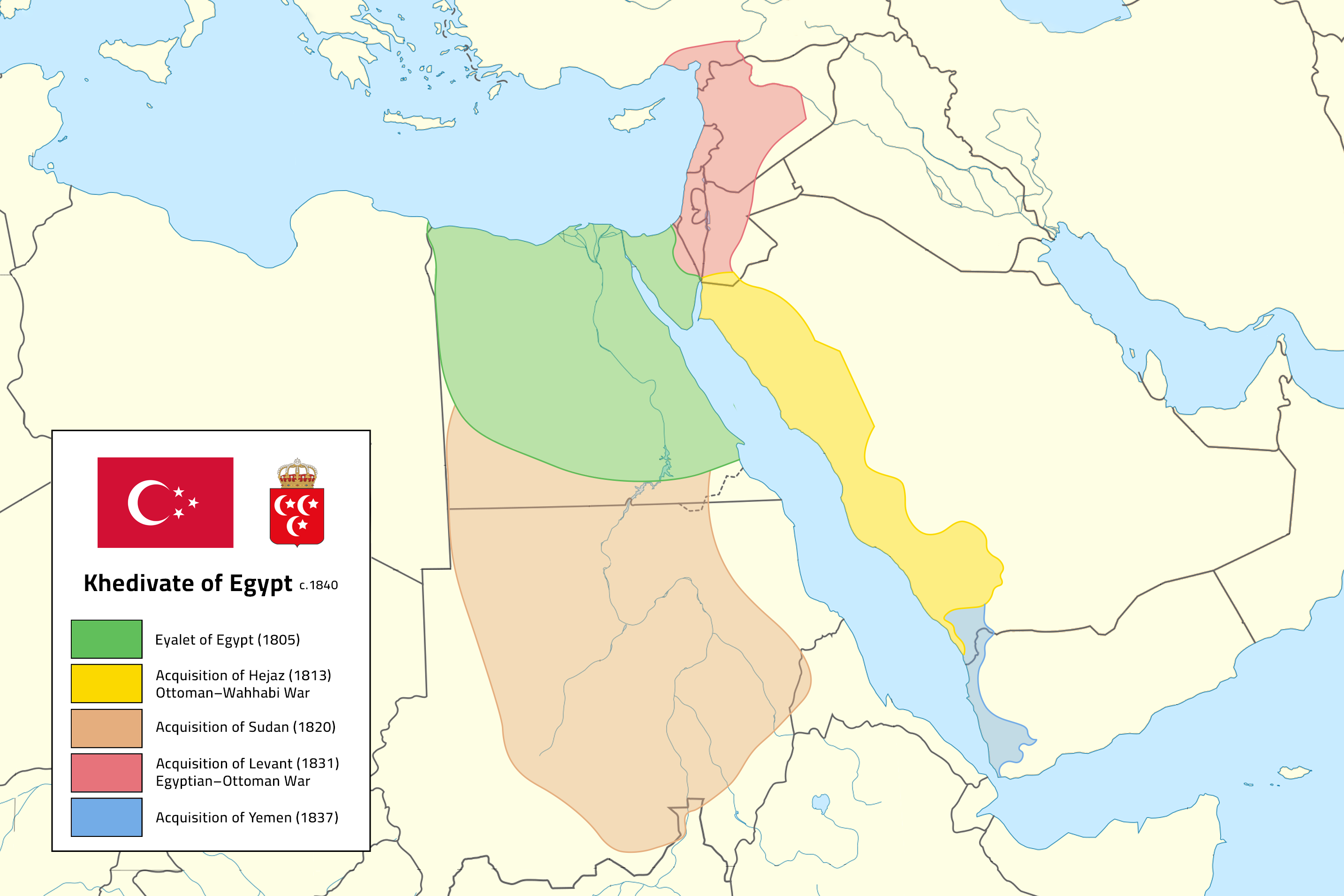
From 1831 until 1841, Syria was governed by Egypt under Muhammad Ali

As part of the Tanzimat reforms, an Ottoman law passed in 1864 provided for a standard provincial administration throughout the empire with the Eyalets becoming smaller Vilayets governed by a Wali, or governor, still appointed by the Sultan but with new provincial assemblies participating in administration. The territory of Greater Syria in the final period of Ottoman rule included modern Syria, Lebanon, Israel, Jordan, Palestine, and parts of Turkey and Iraq.

During World War I, French diplomat François Georges-Picot and British diplomat Mark Sykes secretly agreed on the post war division of the Ottoman Empire into respective zones of influence in the Sykes-Picot Agreement of 1916. In October 1918, Arab and British troops advanced into Syria and captured Damascus and Aleppo. In line with the Sykes-Picot agreement, Syria became a League of Nations mandate under French control in 1920.

The demographics of this area underwent a huge shift in the early part of the 20th century when Ottoman troops along with Kurdish detachments conducted ethnic cleansing of its Christian populations. Some Circassian, Kurdish and Chechens tribes cooperated with the Ottoman authorities in the massacres of Armenian and Assyrian Christians in Upper Mesopotamia, in southeastern Turkey, between 1914 and 1920, with further attacks on unarmed fleeing civilians conducted by local Arab militias. Many Assyrians fled to northeastern Syria during the Simele massacre in the early 1930s in Iraq and settled mainly in the Al-Hasakah Governorate governate in the Jazira Region. and burned the town. The town was destroyed and the Christian population, about 300 families, fled to the towns of Qamishli and Hasakah. During the great war, Kurdish tribes attacked and sacked and villages in Albaq District immediately to the north of Hakkari mountains. According to lieutenant Ronald Sempill Stafford, a large numbers of Assyrians and Armenians were killed.

In 1941, the Assyrian community of al-Malikiyah was subjected to a vicious assault. Even though the assault failed, Assyrians were terrorized and left in large numbers, and the immigration of Kurds from Turkey to the area have resulted in a Kurdish majority in Amuda, al-Malikiyah, and al-Darbasiyah. The historically important Christian city of Nusaybin had a similar fate when its Christian population left after it was ceded to Turkey through the Franco-Turkish Agreement of Ankara in October 1921. The Christian population of the city crossed the border into Syria and settled in Qamishli, which was separated by the railway (new border) from Nusaybin. Nusaybin became Kurdish and Qamishli became a Syriac Christian city. While many Kurds have lineage in Syria for centuries, things soon changed, with the immigration of Kurds beginning in 1926 following the failure of the rebellion of Saeed Ali Naqshbandi against the Turkish authorities. During the 1920s, waves of Kurds fled their homes in Turkey and settled in northeastern Syria where they were granted citizenship by the French mandate authorities.

== Modern history ==
=== French Mandate ===
The States of the French Mandate

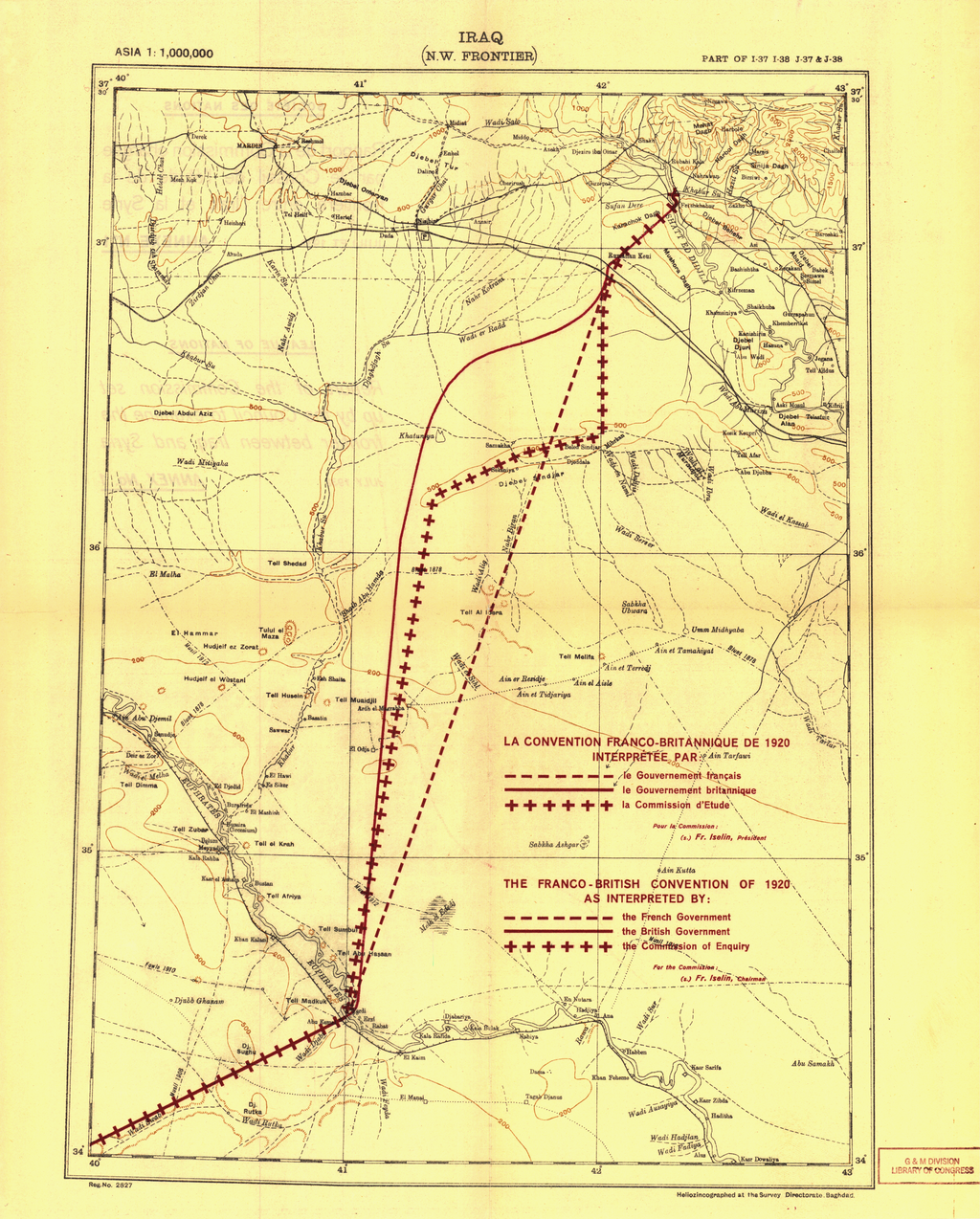
Map marking boundary between British and French territory

In 1919, a short-lived dependent Kingdom of Syria was established under Emir Faisal I of the Hashemite dynasty, who later became the king of Iraq. In March 1920, the Syrian National Congress proclaimed Faisal as king of Syria "in its natural boundaries" from the Taurus mountains in Turkey to the Sinai desert in Egypt. However, his rule in Syria ended after only a few months following a clash between his Syrian Arab forces and French forces at the Battle of Maysalun. French troops took control of Syria and forced Faisal to flee. Later that year the San Remo conference split up Faisal's kingdom by placing Syria-Lebanon under a French mandate, and Palestine under British control. Syria was divided into three autonomous regions by the French, with separate areas for the Alawis on the coast and the Druze in the south.

Nationalist agitation against French rule led to Sultan al-Atrash leading a revolt that broke out in the Druze Mountain in 1925 and spread across the whole of Syria and parts of Lebanon. The revolt saw fierce battles between rebel and French forces in Damascus, Homs and Hama before it was suppressed in 1927.

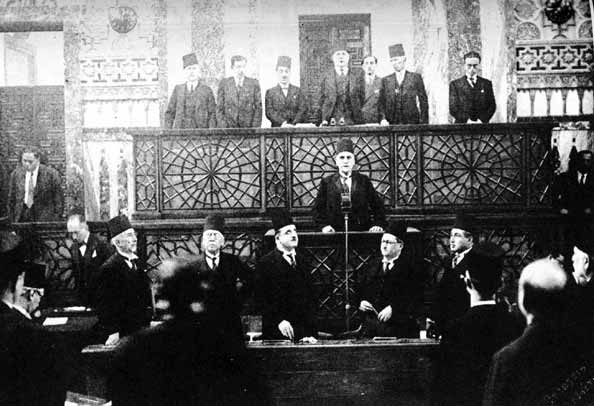
The inauguration of President Hashim al-Atassi in 1936

The French sentenced Sultan al-Atrash to death, but he had escaped with the rebels to Transjordan and was eventually pardoned. He returned to Syria in 1937 and was met with a huge public reception. Elections were held in 1928 for a constituent assembly, which drafted a constitution for Syria. However, the French High Commissioner rejected the proposals, sparking nationalist protests.

On 14 May 1930, the French high commissioner promulgated a constitution for the Syrian State. On 22 May 1930, the State of Syria was declared the Republic of Syria and a new Syrian Constitution was promulgated by the French High Commissioner.

Syria and France negotiated a treaty of independence in September 1936. France agreed to Syrian independence in principle although maintained French military and economic dominance. Hashim al-Atassi, who had been Prime Minister under King Faisal's brief reign, was the first president to be elected under a new constitution, effectively the first incarnation of the modern republic of Syria. However, the treaty never came into force because the French Legislature refused to ratify it. With the fall of France in 1940 during World War II, Syria came under the control of Vichy France until the British and Free French occupied the country in the Syria-Lebanon campaign in July 1941. Syria proclaimed its independence again in 1941, but it was not until 1 January 1944 that it was recognised as an independent republic. There were protests in 1945 over the slow pace of French withdrawal. The French responded to these protests with artillery. In an effort to stop the movement toward independence, French troops occupied the Syrian parliament in May 1945 and cut off Damascus's electricity. Training their guns on Damascus's old city, the French killed 400 Syrians and destroyed hundreds of homes. With casualties mounting Winston Churchill ordered British troops to invade Syria where they escorted French troops to their barracks on 1 June. With continuing pressure from the British and Syrian nationalist groups the French were forced to evacuate the last of their troops in April 1946, leaving the country in the hands of a republican government that had been formed during the mandate.

=== Independence, war and instability ===
Syria became independent on 17 April 1946. Syrian politics from independence through the late 1960s were marked by upheaval. Between 1946 and 1956, Syria had 20 different cabinets and drafted four separate constitutions.

In 1948, Syria was involved in the Arab–Israeli War, aligning with the other local Arab states who wanted to prevent the emergence of the new state of Israel. The Syrian army entered northern Israel but, after bitter fighting, was gradually driven back to the Golan Heights by the Israelis. An armistice was agreed in July 1949. A demilitarized zone under UN supervision was established; the status of these territories proved a stumbling-block for all future Syrian-Israeli negotiations. It was during this period that many Syrian Jews, who faced discriminations, fled Syria as part of Jewish exodus from Arab countries.

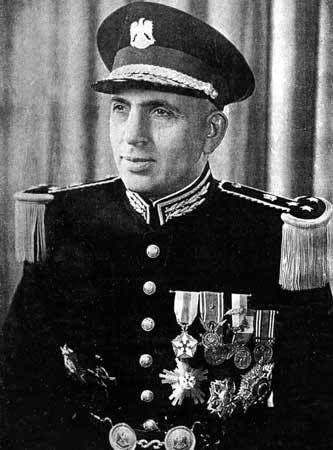
President Adib Shishakli

The outcome of the war was one of factors behind the March 1949 Syrian coup d'état by Col. Husni al-Za'im, in what has been described as the first military overthrow of the Arab World since the Second World War. The coup was caused due to the disgrace the army faced in the 1948 Arab-Israeli War, and thus, sought to relieve itself of that shame. This was soon followed by another coup by Col. Sami al-Hinnawi. Army officer, which was caused by the alienation of Za'im's allies. Adib Shishakli seized power in the third military coup of 1949, in an attempt to prevent a union with Iraq. A Jabal al-Druze uprising was suppressed after extensive fighting (1953–54). Growing discontent eventually led to another coup, in which Shishakli was overthrown in February 1954. The Arab Socialist Ba'ath Party, founded in 1947, played a part in the overthrow of Shishakli. Veteran nationalist Shukri al-Quwatli was president from 1955 until 1958, but by then his post was largely ceremonial.

Power was increasingly concentrated in the military and security establishment, which had proved itself to be the only force capable of seizing and, perhaps, keeping power. Parliamentary institutions remained weak, dominated by competing parties representing the landowning elites and various Sunni urban notables, whilst the economy was mismanaged and little was done to better the role of Syria's peasant majority. In November 1956, as a direct result of the Suez Crisis, Syria signed a pact with the Soviet Union, providing a foothold for Communist influence within the government in exchange for planes, tanks, and other military equipment being sent to Syria. This increase in Syrian military strength worried Turkey, as it seemed feasible that Syria might attempt to retake İskenderun, a matter of dispute between Syria and Turkey. On the other hand, Syria and the Soviet Union accused Turkey of massing its troops on the Syrian border. Only heated debates in the United Nations (of which Syria was an original member) lessened the threat of war.

In this context, the influence of Nasserism, Pan-Arab and anti-imperial ideologies created fertile ground for the idea of closer ties with Egypt. The appeal of Egyptian President Gamal Abdal Nasser's leadership in the wake of the Suez Crisis created support in Syria for union with Egypt. On 1 February 1958, Syrian President al-Quwatli and Nasser announced the merging of the two states, creating the United Arab Republic. The union was not a success, however. Discontent with Egyptian dominance of the UAR, led elements opposed to the union under Abd al-Karim al-Nahlawi, to seize power on 28 September 1961. Two days later, Syria re-established itself as the Syrian Arab Republic. Frequent coups, military revolts, civil disorders and bloody riots characterized the 1960s.

=== Ba'athist Syria (1963–2024) ===
==== Intra-Ba'ath power struggles (1963–1970) ====
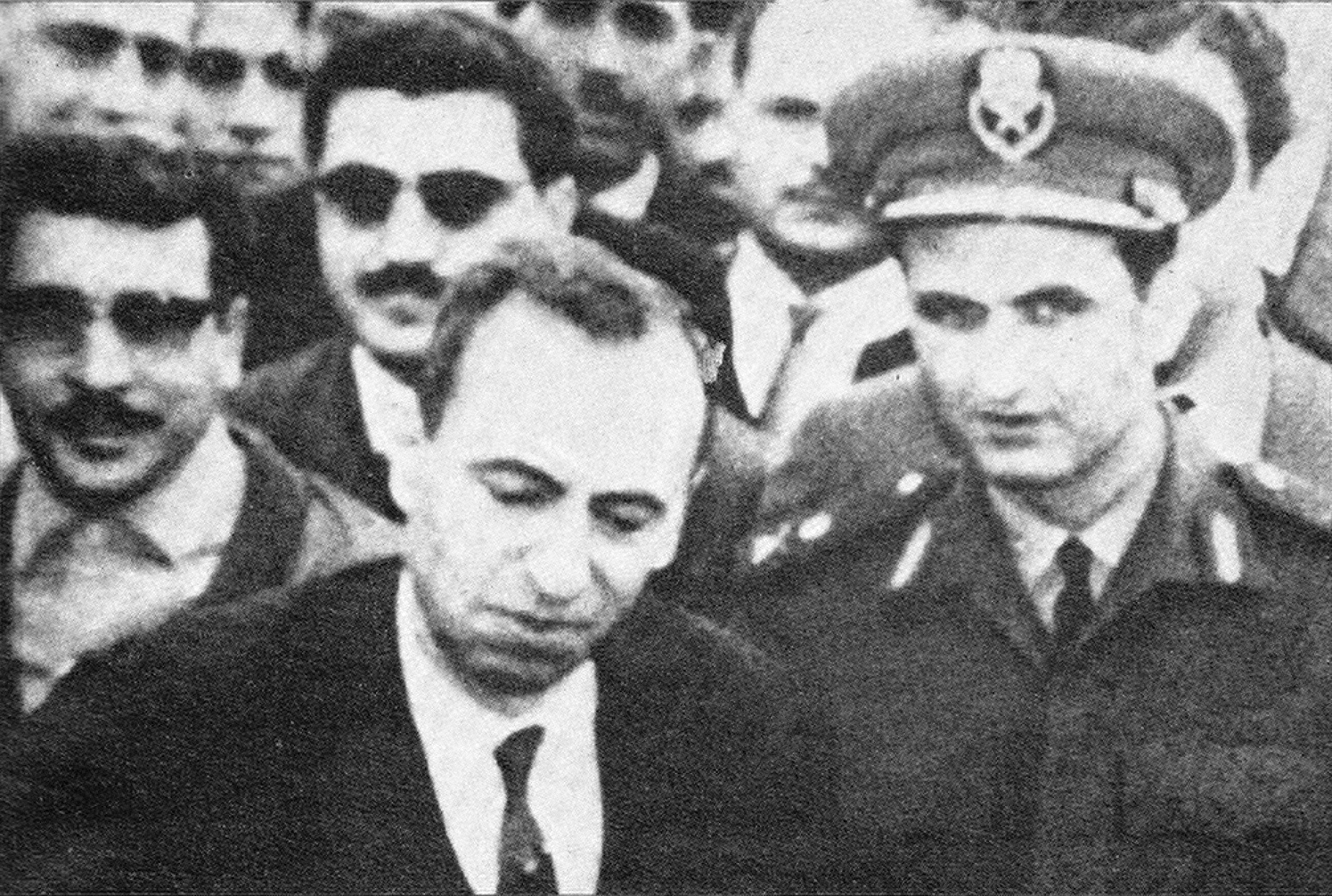
Salah Jadid (right) alongside Ba'ath party founder Michel Aflaq (left) shortly after the 1963 coup. Neo-Ba'athist Military Committee led by Jadid and Hafez al-Assad later overthrew the National Command in another coup in 1966, leading to a schism within Baathist movement

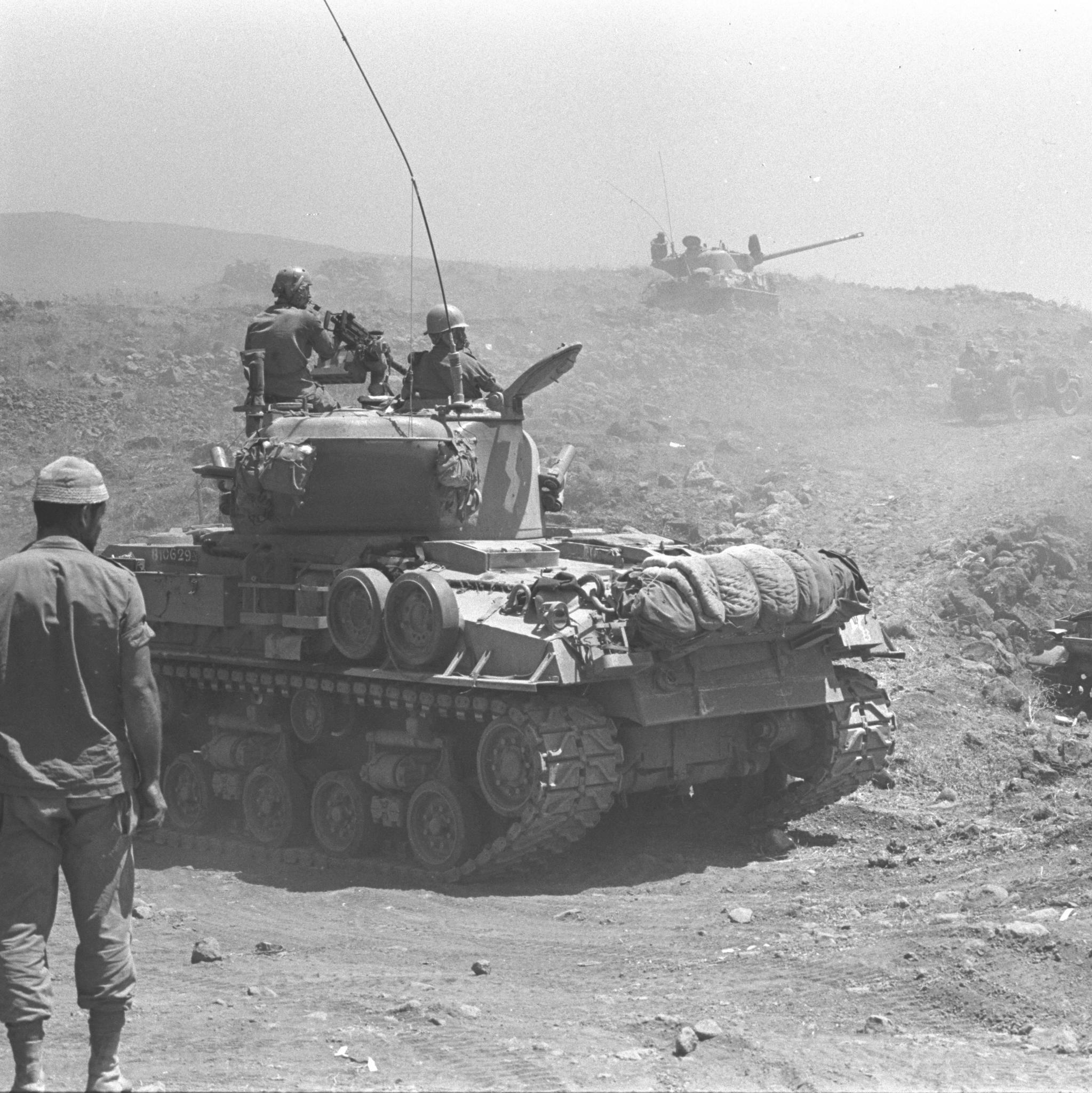
Israeli tanks advancing on Golan Heights during the 1967 Six-Day War. Then Defence Minister Hafez al-Assad was widely blamed for the failure of Syrian military, intensifying his rivalry with Jadid

The 8 March 1963 coup, resulted in installation of the National Council of the Revolutionary Command (NCRC), a group of military and civilian officials who assumed control of all executive and legislative authority. The takeover was engineered by members of the Ba'ath Party led by Michel Aflaq and Salah al-Din al-Bitar. The new cabinet was dominated by Ba'ath members; and Salah al-Din al-Bitar became the Syrian premier.

The 1963 Ba'athist coup marked a "radical break" in modern Syrian history, after which Ba'ath party monopolised power to establish a one-party state and shaped a new socio-political order in Syria by enforcing its state ideology. Since the establishment of Ba'athist state, Syria has been ruled as a totalitarian system marked by the pervasive grip of Ba'ath party over all aspects of daily life. Civil society, political activities, economy, religious life, culture, social activities, etc. have been monitored, controlled and repressed by the state through Ba'athist organizations and the dreaded secret police.

Ba'ath party's National Command was overthrown early in 1966 by ultra-leftist military dissidents of the party led by General Salah Jadid. Under Jadid's rule, Syria aligned itself with the Soviet bloc and pursued hardline policies towards Israel and "reactionary" Arab states especially Saudi Arabia, calling for the mobilization of a "people's war" against Zionism rather than inter-Arab military alliances. Domestically, Jadid attempted a socialist transformation of Syrian society at forced pace, creating unrest and economical difficulties. Opponents of the government were harshly suppressed, while the Ba'ath Party replaced parliament as law-making body and other parties were banned. Public support for his government, such as it was, declined sharply following Syria's defeat in the 1967 Six-Day War, when Israel destroyed much of Syria's air force and captured the Golan Heights.

Conflicts also arose over different interpretations of the legal status of the Demilitarized Zone. Israel maintained that it had sovereign rights over the zone, allowing the civilian use of farmland. Syria and the UN maintained that no party had sovereign rights over the zone. Israel was accused by Syria of cultivating lands in the Demilitarized Zone, using armored tractors backed by Israel forces. Syria claimed that the situation was the result of an Israeli aim to increase tension so as to justify large-scale aggression, and to expand its occupation of the Demilitarized Zone by liquidating the rights of Arab cultivators. The Israeli defense minister Moshe Dayan said in a 1976 interview that Israel provoked more than 80% of the clashes with Syria.

Conflict developed between right-wing army officers and the more moderate civilian wing of the Ba'ath Party. The 1970 retreat of Syrian forces sent to aid the PLO during the "Black September" hostilities with Jordan reflected this political disagreement within the ruling Ba'ath leadership. On 13 November 1970, Minister of Defense Hafez al-Assad seized power in a bloodless military overthrow ("The Corrective Movement").

==== Syria under Hafez al-Assad (1970–2000) ====
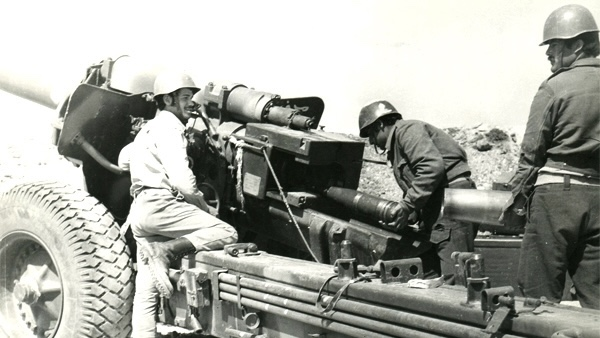
Syrian artillery crew during Yom Kippur War against Israel

Upon assuming power, Hafez al-Assad moved quickly to create an organizational infrastructure for his government and to consolidate control. The Provisional Regional Command of Assad's Arab Socialist Ba'ath Party nominated a 173-member legislature, the People's Council, in which the Ba'ath Party took 87 seats. The remaining seats were divided among "popular organizations" and other minor parties. In March 1971, the party held its regional congress and elected a new 21-member Regional Command headed by Assad.

In the same month, a national referendum was held to confirm Assad as president for a 7-year term. In March 1972, to broaden the base of his government, Assad formed the National Progressive Front, a coalition of parties led by the Ba'ath Party, and elections were held to establish local councils in each of Syria's 14 governorates. In March 1973, a new Syrian constitution went into effect followed shortly thereafter by parliamentary elections for the People's Council, the first such elections since 1962. The 1973 Constitution defined Syria as a secular socialist state with Islam recognised as the majority religion.

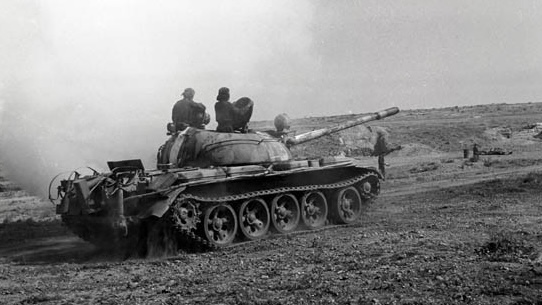
Syrian tank during October war, 1973

On 6 October 1973, Syria and Egypt initiated the Yom Kippur War by launching a surprise attack on Israel. After intense fighting, the Syrians were repulsed in the Golan Heights. The Israelis pushed deeper into Syrian territory, beyond the 1967 boundary. As a result, Israel continues to occupy the Golan Heights as part of the Israeli-occupied territories. In 1975, Assad said he would be prepared to make peace with Israel in return for an Israeli withdrawal from "all occupied Arab land".

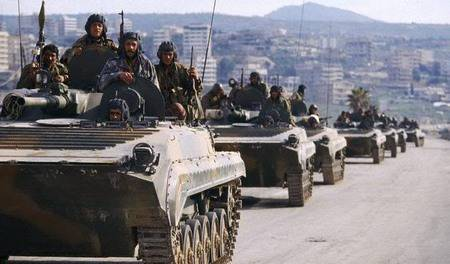
Syrian army column in Lebanon

In 1976, the Syrian army intervened in the Lebanese civil war to ensure that the status quo was maintained, and the Maronite Christian Lebanese Front remained in power. This was the beginning of what turned out to be a thirty-year Syrian military occupation. Many crimes in Lebanon, including the accused assassinations of Rafik Hariri, Kamal Jumblat and Bachir Gemayel were attributed to the Syrian forces and intelligence services although were not proven to this day. In 1981, Israel declared its annexation of the Golan Heights. The following year, Israel invaded Lebanon and attacked the Syrian army, forcing it to withdraw from several areas. When Lebanon and Israel announced the end of hostilities in 1983, Syrian forces remained in Lebanon. Syria also switched side and began to oppose the Lebanese Front. Through extensive use of proxy militias, Syria attempted to stop Israel from taking over southern Lebanon. Assad sent troops into Lebanon for a second time in 1987 to enforce a ceasefire in Beirut.

The Syrian-sponsored Taif Agreement brought the Lebanese civil war to an end in 1990. The Syrian Army's presence in Lebanon continued until 2005, exerting a strong influence over Lebanese politics. The assassination of the popular former Lebanese Prime Minister Rafik Hariri, was blamed on Syria, and pressure was put on Syria to withdraw their forces from Lebanon. On 26 April 2005 the bulk of the Syrian forces withdrew from Lebanon although some of its intelligence operatives remained, drawing further international rebuke.

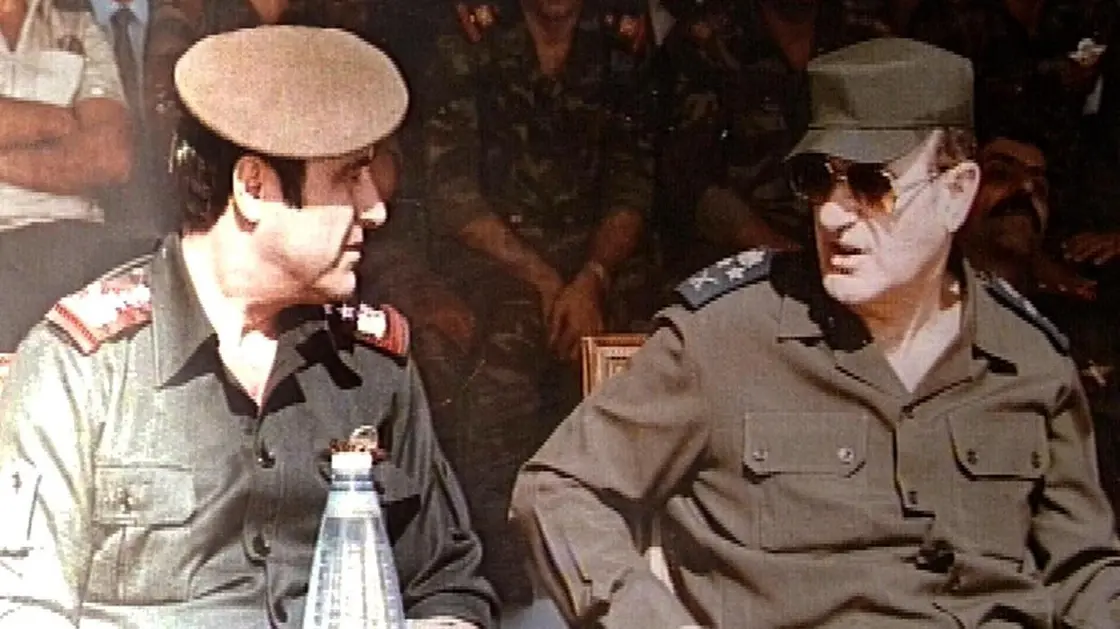
Hafez al-Assad (right) alongside his brother Rifaat al-Assad (left) in 1984

About one million Syrian workers went to Lebanon after the war to find jobs in the reconstruction of the country. In 1994 the Lebanese government controversially granted citizenship to over 200,000 Syrian residents in the country. (For more on these issues, see Demographics of Lebanon)

The government was not without its critics, though open dissent was repressed. A serious challenge arose in the late 1970s, however, from traditional Sunni Muslims, who rejected the Ba'athist program. Repulsed by the sectarian minority rule by the Alawites, Muslim groups launched popular uprisings across Syria, seeking the overthrow of Hafez al-Assad and establishment of an Islamic government. In response, Assad began to stress Syria's adherence to Islam. At the start of Iran–Iraq War, in September 1980, Syria supported Iran, in keeping with the traditional rivalry between Ba'athist leaderships in Iraq and Syria. The arch-conservative Muslim Brotherhood, centered in the city of Hama, was finally crushed in February 1982 when parts of the city were hit by artillery fire and leaving between 10,000 and 25,000 people, mostly civilians, dead or wounded (see Hama massacre). The government's actions at Hama have been described as possibly being "the single deadliest act by any Arab government against its own people in the modern Middle East". Since then, public manifestations of anti-government activity have been limited. Amidst the pressure of the time, Hafez al-Assad also cracked down on secular and liberal dissent, jailing and torturing prominent Syrian figures like lawyer and former judge Haitham al-Maleh, political leader Riad al-Turk, writer Akram al-Bunni, and poet Mohammed al-Maghout.

When Iraq invaded Kuwait in 1990, Syria joined the US-led coalition against Iraq in the Gulf War. This led to improved relations with the US and other Arab states. Syria participated in the multilateral Southwest Asia Peace Conference in Madrid in October 1991, and during the 1990s engaged in direct negotiations with Israel. These negotiations failed over the Golan Heights issue and there have been no further direct Syrian–Israeli talks since President Hafez al-Assad's meeting with then President Bill Clinton in Geneva in March 2000.

After securing his control over the Syrian government, Assad initially chose his brother, Rifaat al-Assad, as his successor, but Rifaat's attempted power grab while Hafez was in a coma in 1984 led to his exile in Europe. Following the incident, Bassel al-Assad was groomed to succeed his father. Hafez's efforts to make Bassel the next president of Syria intensified in the early 1990s; after Hafez's election victory in 1991 in an election where Hafez was the only candidate, the president was publicly referred to as "Abu Basil" (Father of Bassel). Shortly after Bassel died in a car accident in 1994, Bashar al-Assad was recalled to the Syrian Army. State propaganda soon began elevating Bashar's public image as "the hope of the masses" to prepare the public for a continuation of the rule of the Assad family. Soon after the death of Bassel, Hafez al-Assad decided to make Bashar the new heir apparent.

==== Syria under Bashar al-Assad (2000–2024) ====
Hafez al-Assad died on 10 June 2000, after 30 years in power. Immediately following al-Assad's death, the Syrian Parliament amended the constitution, reducing the mandatory minimum age of the President from 40 to 34. This allowed Bashar Assad to become eligible for nomination by the ruling Ba'ath party. On 10 July 2000, Bashar al-Assad was elected president by referendum in which he ran unopposed, garnering 97.29% of the vote, according to Syrian Government statistics. Bashar al-Assad's reign continued the totalitarian practices of his father, through brutal repression of political dissidents and clampdown on civil society movements. All political opposition is banned. Patronage networks of a few parties in the Ba'ath party-led National Progressive Front loyal to Assad regime are allowed to operate under the strict management of Ba'athist Political Security Directorate.

The period after Bashar al-Assad's election in the summer of 2000 saw new hopes of reform and was dubbed the Damascus Spring. The period was characterized by the emergence of numerous political forums or salons where groups of like-minded people met in private houses to debate political and social issues. The phenomenon of salons spread rapidly in Damascus and to a lesser extent in other cities. Political activists, such as Riad Seif, Haitham al-Maleh, Kamal al-Labwani, Riyad al-Turk, and Aref Dalila were important in mobilizing the movement. The most famous of the forums were the Riad Seif Forum and the Jamal al-Atassi Forum. Pro-democracy activists mobilized around a number of political demands, expressed in the "Manifesto of the 99". Assad ordered the release of some 600 political prisoners in November 2000. The outlawed Muslim Brotherhood resumed its political activity. In May 2001 Pope John Paul II paid a historic visit to Syria.

However, by the autumn of 2001, the authorities had suppressed the pro-reform movement, crushing hopes of a break with the authoritarian past of Hafez al-Assad. Arrests of leading intellectuals continued, punctuated by occasional amnesties, over the following decade. Although the Damascus Spring had lasted for a short period, its effects still echo during the political, cultural and intellectual debates in Syria today. While Bashar had pledged to undertake economic liberalization, in practice, the new policies exacerbated corruption and cronyism of Ba'ath party oligarchs loyal to the Assad family.

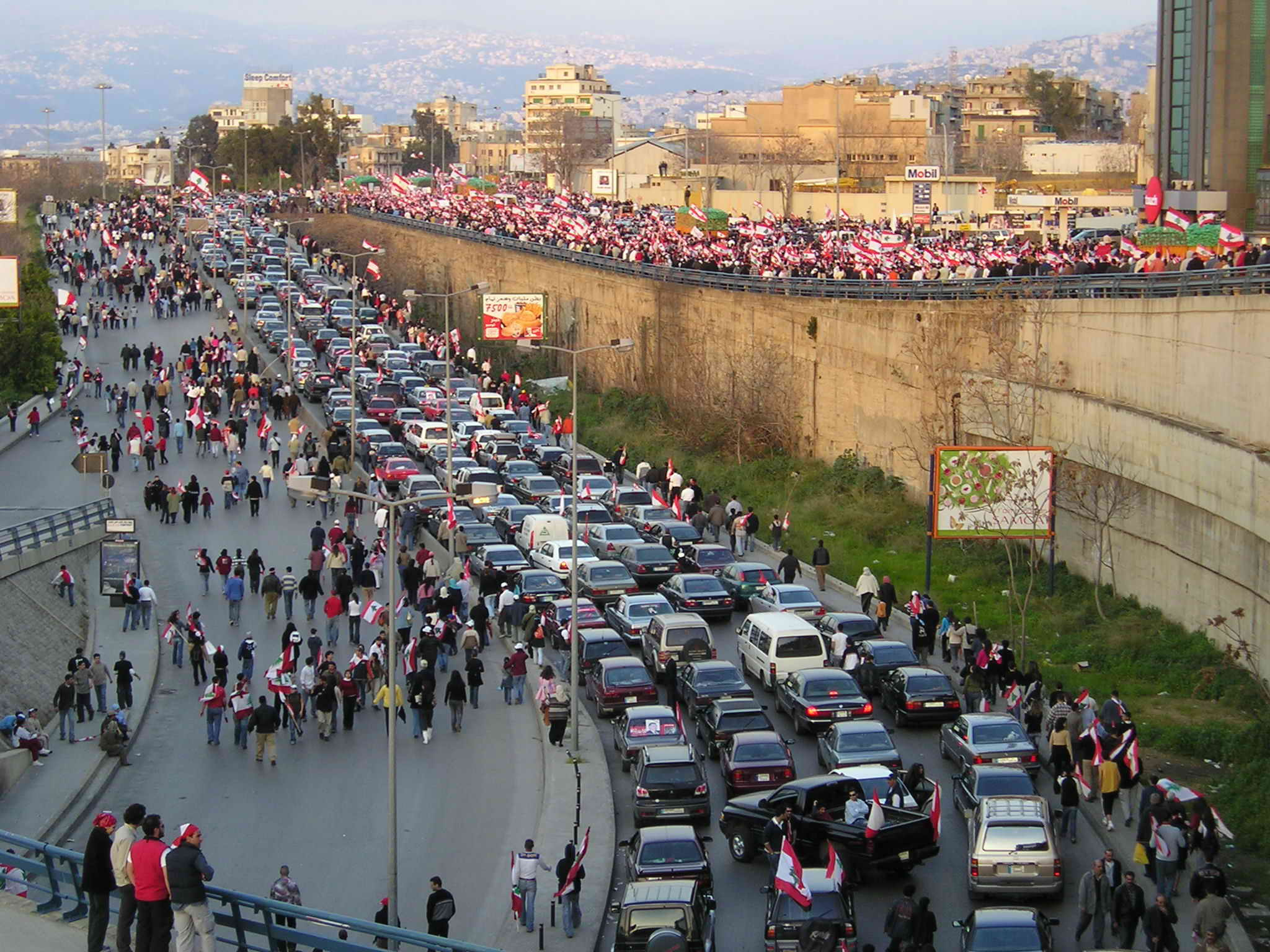
Killing of Rafic Hariri triggered a massive Intifada against Syrian occupation of Lebanon in 2005, which led to the withdrawal of Syrian military forces after global backlash

Tensions with the USA grew worse after 2002, when the US claimed Damascus was acquiring weapons of mass destruction and included Syria in a list of states that they said made-up an "axis of evil". The USA was critical of Syria because of its strong relationships with Hamas, the Islamic Jihad Movement in Palestine and Hezbollah, which the US, Israel and EU regard as terrorist groups. In 2003 the US threatened sanctions if Damascus failed to make what Washington called the "right decisions". Syria denied US allegations that it was developing chemical weapons and helping fugitive Iraqis. An Israeli air strike against a Palestinian militant camp near Damascus in October 2003 was described by Syria as "military aggression". President Assad visited Turkey in January 2004, the first Syrian leader to do so. The trip marked the end of decades of frosty relations, although ties were to sour again after 2011. In May 2004, the USA imposed economic sanctions on Syria over what it called its support for terrorism and failure to stop militants entering Iraq. Tensions with the US escalated in early 2005 after the killing of the former Lebanese PM Hariri in Beirut. Washington cited Syrian influence in Lebanon behind the assassination. Damascus was urged to withdraw its forces from Lebanon, which it did by April.

Following the Qamishli massacre in 2004, the Syrian Kurds protested in Brussels, in Geneva, in Germany, at the US and UK embassies, and in Turkey. The protesters pledged against violence in north-east Syria starting Friday, 12 March 2004, and reportedly extending over the weekend resulting in several deaths, according to reports. The Kurds allege the Syrian government encouraged and armed the attackers. Signs of rioting were seen in the towns of Qameshli and Hassakeh.

Renewed opposition activity occurred in October 2005 when activist Michel Kilo and other opposition figures launched the Damascus Declaration, which criticized the Syrian government as "authoritarian, totalitarian and cliquish" and called for democratic reform. Leading dissidents Kamal al-Labwani and Michel Kilo were sentenced to long jail terms in 2007, only weeks after human rights lawyer Anwar al-Bunni was jailed. Although Bashar al-Assad said he would reform, the reforms have been limited to some market reforms.

Over the years the authorities have tightened Internet censorship with laws such as forcing Internet cafes to record all the comments users post on chat forums. While the authorities have relaxed rules so that radio channels can now play Western pop music, websites such as Wikipedia, YouTube, Facebook and Amazon have been blocked, but were recently unblocked throughout the nation.

Syria's international relations improved for a period. Diplomatic relations with Iraq were restored in 2006, after nearly a quarter century. In March 2007, dialogue between Syria and the European Union was relaunched. The following month saw US House of Representatives Speaker Nancy Pelosi meet President Assad in Damascus, although President Bush objected. Secretary of State Condoleezza Rice then met with Syrian Foreign Minister Walid Muallem in Egypt, in the first contact at this level for two years.

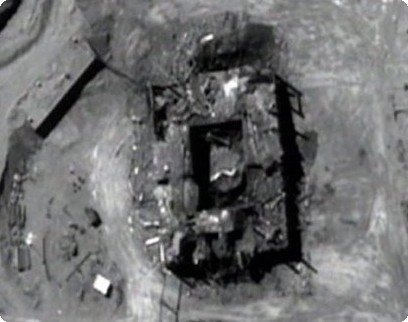
Alleged Syrian nuclear reactor site destroyed in air strikes by Israeli Air Force during Operation Outside the Box. (Photo from video released by the US government)

An Israeli air strike against a site in northern Syria in September 2007 was a setback to improving relations. The Israelis claimed the site was a nuclear facility under construction with North Korean help. 2008 March – When Syria hosted an Arab League summit in 2008, many Western states sent low-level delegations in protest at Syria's stance on Lebanon. However, the diplomatic thaw resumed when President Assad met the then French President Nicolas Sarkozy in Paris in July 2008. The visit signaled the end of Syria's diplomatic isolation by the West that followed the assassination of Hariri in 2005. While in Paris, President Assad also met the recently elected Lebanese president, Michel Suleiman. The two men laid the foundations for establishing full diplomatic relations between their countries. Later in the year, Damascus hosted a four-way summit between Syria, France, Turkey and Qatar, in a bid to boost efforts towards Middle East peace.

In April 2008, President Assad told a Qatari newspaper that Syria and Israel had been discussing a peace treaty for a year, with Turkey acting as a mediator. This was confirmed in May 2008 by a spokesman for Israeli Prime Minister Ehud Olmert. The status of the Golan Heights, a major obstacle to a peace treaty, was being discussed.

In 2008, an explosion killed 17 on the outskirts of Damascus, the most deadly attack in Syria in several years. The government blamed Islamist militants.

2009 saw a number of high level meetings between Syrian and US government diplomats and officials. US special envoy George J. Mitchell visited for talks with President Assad on Middle East peace. Trading launched on Syria's stock exchange in a gesture towards liberalising the state-controlled economy. The Syrian writer and pro-democracy campaigner Michel Kilo was released from prison after serving a three-year sentence. In 2010, the USA posted its first ambassador to Syria after a five-year break.

The thaw in diplomatic relations came to an abrupt end. In May 2010, the US renewed sanctions against Syria, saying that it supported terrorist groups, seeks weapons of mass destruction and has provided Lebanon's Hezbollah with Scud missiles in violation of UN resolutions. In 2011 the UN's IAEA nuclear watchdog reported Syria to the UN Security Council over its alleged covert nuclear programme.

=== Syrian Civil War (2011–2024) ===
Former flag of Syria (1932–58), now used by the Syrian opposition and Free Syrian militias

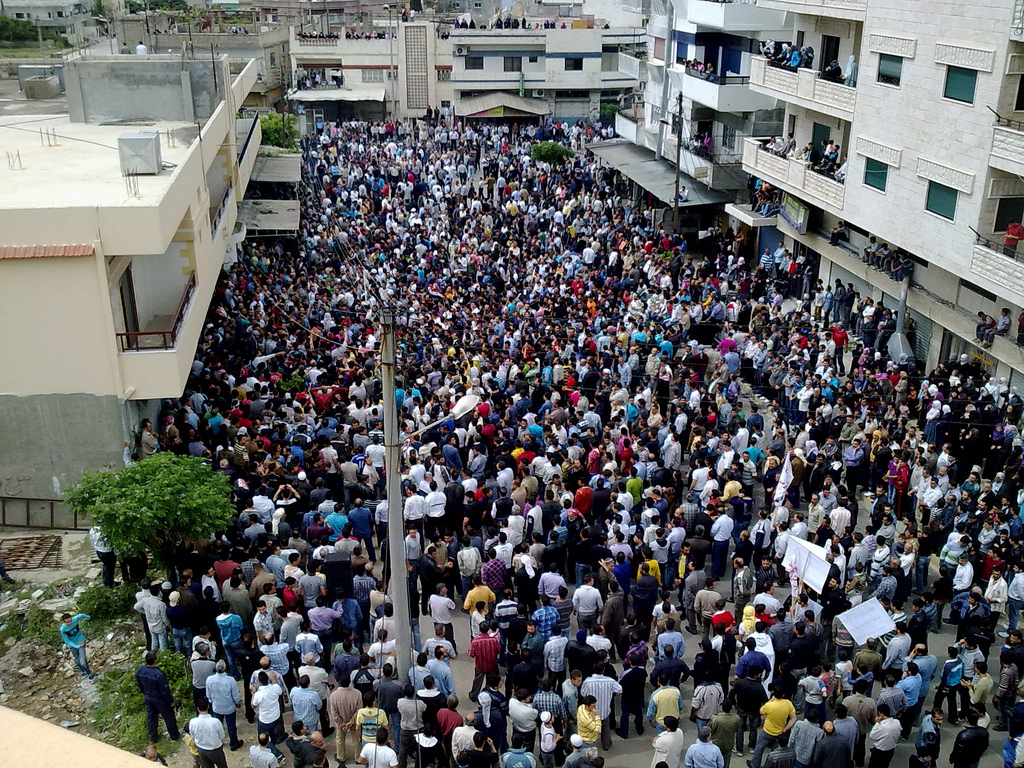
Opposition demonstration in Baniyas, 29 April 2011

Syrian Civil War is an ongoing internal conflict between the Syrian army and the Syrian opposition groups composed of different factions. Encouraged by the events of Arab Spring, there were massive anti-government protests in Damascus and the southern city of Deraa in March 2011. Protestors demanded political freedom and the release of political prisoners. This was immediately followed by a government crackdown whereby the Syrian Army was deployed to quell unrest and killed hundreds of civilians. This led to widespread outcry, fuelling further protests across all provinces in the country.

Security forces shot and killed a number of people in Deraa, triggering days of violent unrest that steadily spread nationwide over the following months. There were unconfirmed reports that soldiers who refused to open fire on civilians were summarily executed. The Syrian government denied reports of executions and defections, and blamed armed militias for causing trouble. What started as peaceful protests would eventually evolve into armed resistance following months of deadly crackdown launched across Syria by Bashar al-Assad's security apparatus. Tens of thousands of civilians got killed and displaced and by 2012, the situation had become a full-blown civil war.

Syrian military mass-shooting on unarmed civilians in Jisr ash-Shugur on 5 May 2011, as part of the brutal crackdown ordered by Bashar al-Assad

In July 2011, some of the anti-Assad groups met in Istanbul with the view of bringing together the many opposition groups, both internal and external to Syria. They agreed to form the Syrian National Council. Rebel fighters were joined by army defectors on the Turkish–Syrian border and declared the formation of the Free Syrian Army (FSA). They began forming fighting units to escalate the insurgency from September 2011. From the outset, the FSA was a big-tent coalition of organized and largely independent resistance militias. All Free Syrian militias got unified under the Supreme Military Council in December 2012.

As the Syrian army recaptured the Homs district of Baba Amr in March 2012, the UN Security Council endorsed a non-binding peace plan drafted by UN envoy Kofi Annan. However, the violence continued unabated. A number of Western nations expelled senior Syrian diplomats in protest. In May, Assad regime's use of heavy weaponry and the massacre of over a hundred civilians in Houla, near Homs, led to widespread outcry and international condemnation.The fifteen nations of the U.N. Security Council unanimously denounced the Assad government for massacring civilians by firing heavy weapons. The U.S., U.K., and eleven other nations jointly expelled Syrian ambassadors and diplomats from their territories.

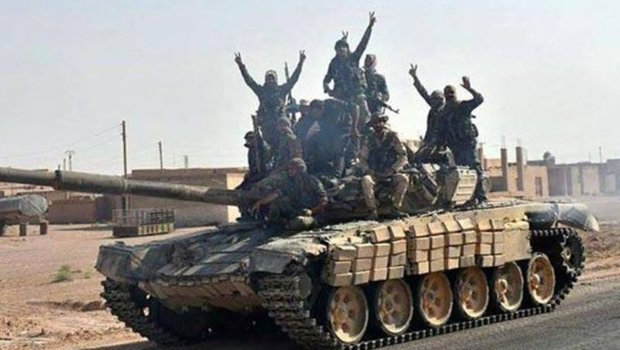
Syrian government forces tank.

The UN reported that, in the first six months, 9,100–11,000 people had been killed during the insurgency, of which 2,470–3,500 were actual combatants and rest were civilians. The Syrian government estimated that more than 3,000 civilians, 2,000–2,500 members of the security forces and over 800 rebels had been killed. UN observers estimated that the death toll in the first six months included over 400 children. Additionally, some media reported that over 600 political prisoners and detainees, some of them children, have died in custody. A prominent case was that of Hamza al-Khateeb. Syria's government has disputed Western and UN casualty estimates, accusing their claims as being based on false reports originating from opposition groups.

According to the UN, about 1.2 million Syrians had been internally displaced within the country and over 355,000 Syrian refugees had fled to the neighboring countries of Jordan, Iraq, Lebanon and Turkey during the first year of fighting.

Military situation in Syria as of February 2026: Controlled by Syrian transitional government (includes TAF) Controlled by Kurdish groups (SDF) Controlled by local Druze factions Controlled by Israeli Defense Forces Controlled by Assadist insurgents Controlled by the Islamic State (IS); (For a more detailed, interactive map, see Template:Syrian Civil War detailed map.)

Investigations by United Nations Human Rights Council and human rights organizations like the Amnesty International have found that vast majority incidents of mass-killings, torture, summary executions, war crimes, chemical attacks, attacks on cultural properties have been perpetrated by Syrian Arab Armed Forces and Ba'athist security apparatus. The conflict has the hallmarks of a sectarian civil war; the leading government figures are Shia Alawites, whilst the rebels are mainly Sunni Muslims, who form the majority of Syrian population. Although neither side in the conflict has described sectarianism as playing a major role, the UN Human Rights Council has warned that "entire communities are at risk of being forced out of the country or of being killed."

The Arab League, the Organisation of Islamic Cooperation, GCC states, the US and the European Union have condemned the use of violence by the Syrian government and applied sanctions against Syria. China and Russia have sought to avoid foreign intervention and called for a negotiated settlement. They have avoided condemning the Syrian government and disagree with sanctions. China has sought to engage with the Syrian opposition. The Arab League and Organisation of Islamic Cooperation have both suspended Syria's membership.

In June 2012 a number of high-ranking military and political personnel, such as Manaf Tlas and Nawaf al-Fares, fled the country. Nawaf al-Fares stated in a video that this was in response to crimes against humanity by the Assad government. In August 2012, the country's Deputy Prime Minister Qadri Jamil said President Assad's resignation could not be a condition for starting peace negotiations.

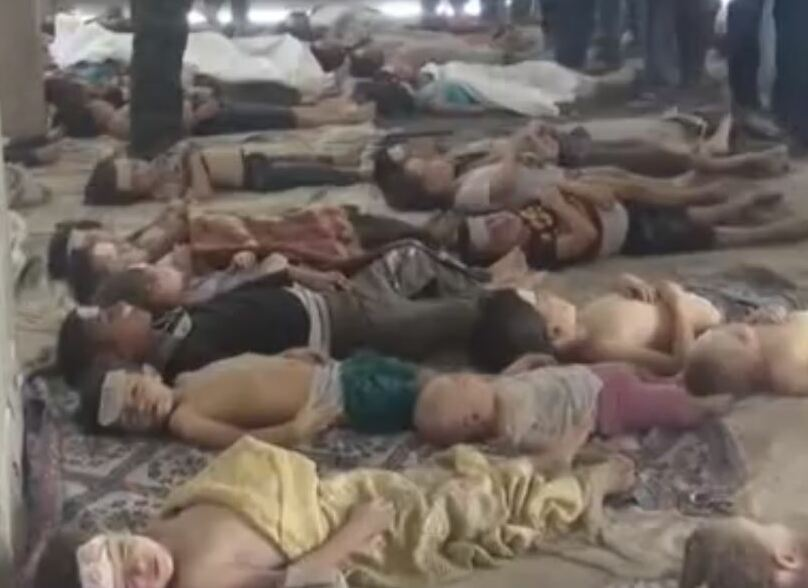
Children killed by the Assad regime in the Ghouta chemical attack, the deadliest chemical weapons attack in the 21st century

After heavy fighting, a fire destroyed much of the historic market of Aleppo in October. A UN-brokered ceasefire during the Islamic holiday of Eid al-Adha soon broke down as fighting and bomb attacks continued in several cities. By this time, the Syrian Arab Red Crescent estimated that 2.5 million people had been displaced within Syria, double the previous estimate. According to the anti-Assad Syrian Observatory for Human Rights, almost 44,000 people have died since the insurgency against began. According to a UN report, the humanitarian situation has been "aggravated by widespread destruction and razing of residential areas. ... Towns and villages across Latakia, Idlib, Hama and Dara'a governorates have been effectively emptied of their populations," the report said. "Entire neighborhoods in southern and eastern Damascus, Deir al-Zour and Aleppo have been razed. The downtown of Homs city has been devastated."

In November 2012, the National Coalition for Syrian Revolutionary and Opposition Forces, commonly named the 'Syrian National Revolutionary Coalition' was formed at a meeting hosted by Qatar. In December 2012, the US, EU members, Gulf Cooperation Council, Turkey and Arab League members moved quickly to recognise the coalition as the "sole legitimate representative of the Syrian people" rather than the former main rebel group, the Syrian National Council. The USA and Persian Gulf states wanted a reshaped opposition coalition to include more Syrians who were fighting on the ground—as opposed to those who had been in exile for decades—and one that was more broadly representative of all Syria's regions. At the same time, the U.S. added al-Nusra Front (now defunct)—one of the most successful rebel military groups—to its terrorist list, citing ties to al-Qaeda. On 20 December 2012, a UN Independent Commission of Inquiry stated that Islamist militias in Syria operate independently of the secular opposition's Supreme Military Command and that some are affiliated with al-Nusra. Many of the insurgents are foreign fighters; "Sunnis hailing from countries in the Middle East and North Africa," and participate in the revolution by fighting under the banners of Islamist militias. The inquiry also reported that Ba'athist regime and state-sponsored deathsquads like the Shabiha have been involved in the extensive mass-killings and sectarian attacks against Sunni families.

A sarin gas attack occurred in Syria, near Damascus, on 21 August 2013. The attack is alleged to have been carried out by the Syrian government of Bashar al-Assad according to French and United States' government's intelligence. The attack led to increased international pressure on the Assad government and demands by pro-democracy opposition activists and liberal internationalists for international military intervention in Syria led by United States and allies.

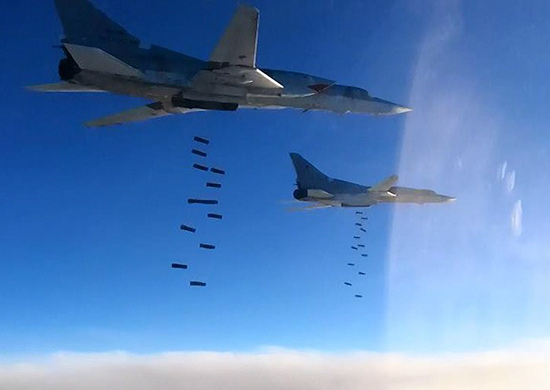
Russian planes bombing positions of the Assad's enemies.

Russian involvement in the Syrian civil war began in late 2015, turning the tide of the conflict in the government's favour. On 22 December 2016, the city of Aleppo was fully captured by the pro-government forces. As of 2022, more than half a million people have been killed in the civil war, with pro-Assad forces responsible for more than 90% of the civilian deaths. Around 14 million people have been forcibly displaced, of which around 6.8 million are externally displaced outside the country, resulting in the largest refugee crisis in the world.

==== Fall of the Assad regime (2024) ====
Syrian opposition offensives that overthrew Assad's regime in 11 days

The rebel offensive, which had begun on 27 November, continued its advance into Hama province following their capture of Aleppo. On 4 December, fierce clashes erupted in Hama province as the Syrian army engaged rebel forces in a bid to halt their advance on the key city of Hama. Government forces claimed to have launched a counteroffensive with air support, pushing back rebel factions, including HTS, around six miles from the city. However, despite reinforcements, the rebels captured the city on 5 December. The fighting led to widespread displacement, with nearly 50,000 people fleeing the area and over 600 casualties reported, including 104 civilians.

Rebel forces reached the outskirts of Homs on 5 December, beginning a three-day battle for the city. Simultaneously, an HTS-coordinated mass uprising led by a coalition of Druze tribes and opposition forces captured the southern cities of Suwayda and Daraa by 6 December, and rapidly advanced northwards to encircle Damascus over the following day. Homs was captured by rebel forces by the early morning of 8 December, leaving no major regime strongholds between the rebel advance and Damascus itself.

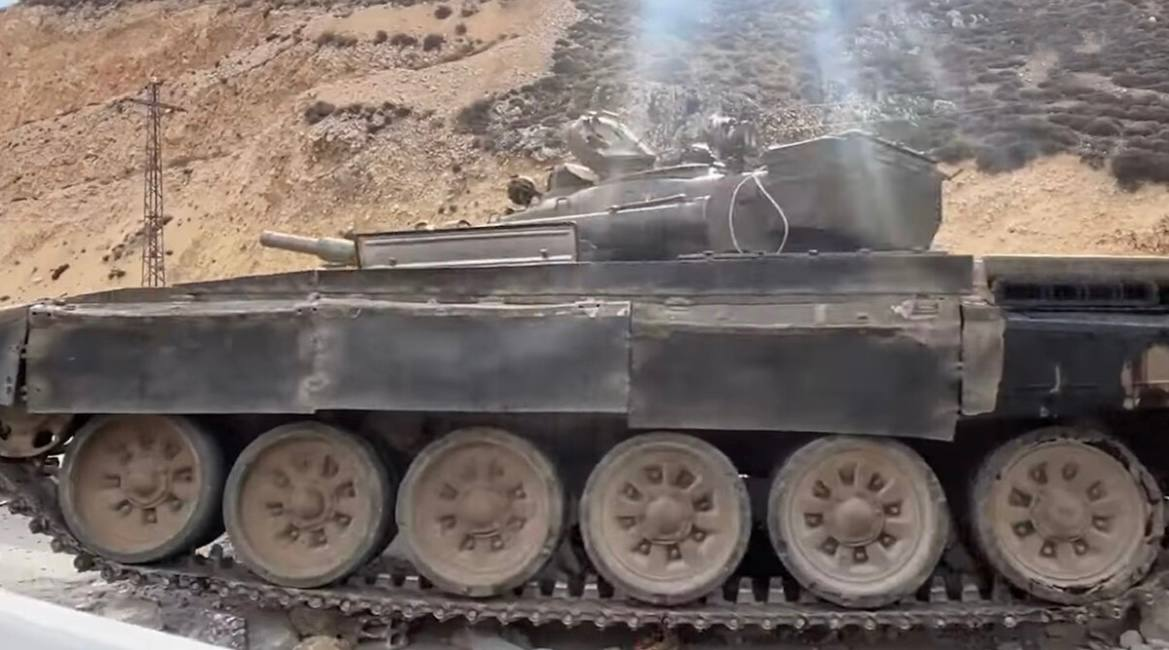
An abandoned tank of Assad's forces on the road to Damascus, December 2024.

Cut off from the Alawite heartland of Tartus and Latakia governorates, faced with a rebel pincer from both north and south bearing down on Damascus, and with no hope of foreign intervention from the regime's Russian and Iranian benefactors, Assadist authority over remaining regime-held territories rapidly disintegrated. The Syrian Arab Armed Forces melted away as its soldiers abandoned their weapons and uniforms, many deserting across the border to Iraq and Lebanon. Opposition forces captured the capital Damascus on 8 December, toppling Bashar al-Assad's government and ending the Assad family's 53-year-long rule over the country. Assad fled to Moscow with his family, where he was granted asylum.

=== Post-Ba'athist Syria (2024–present) ===
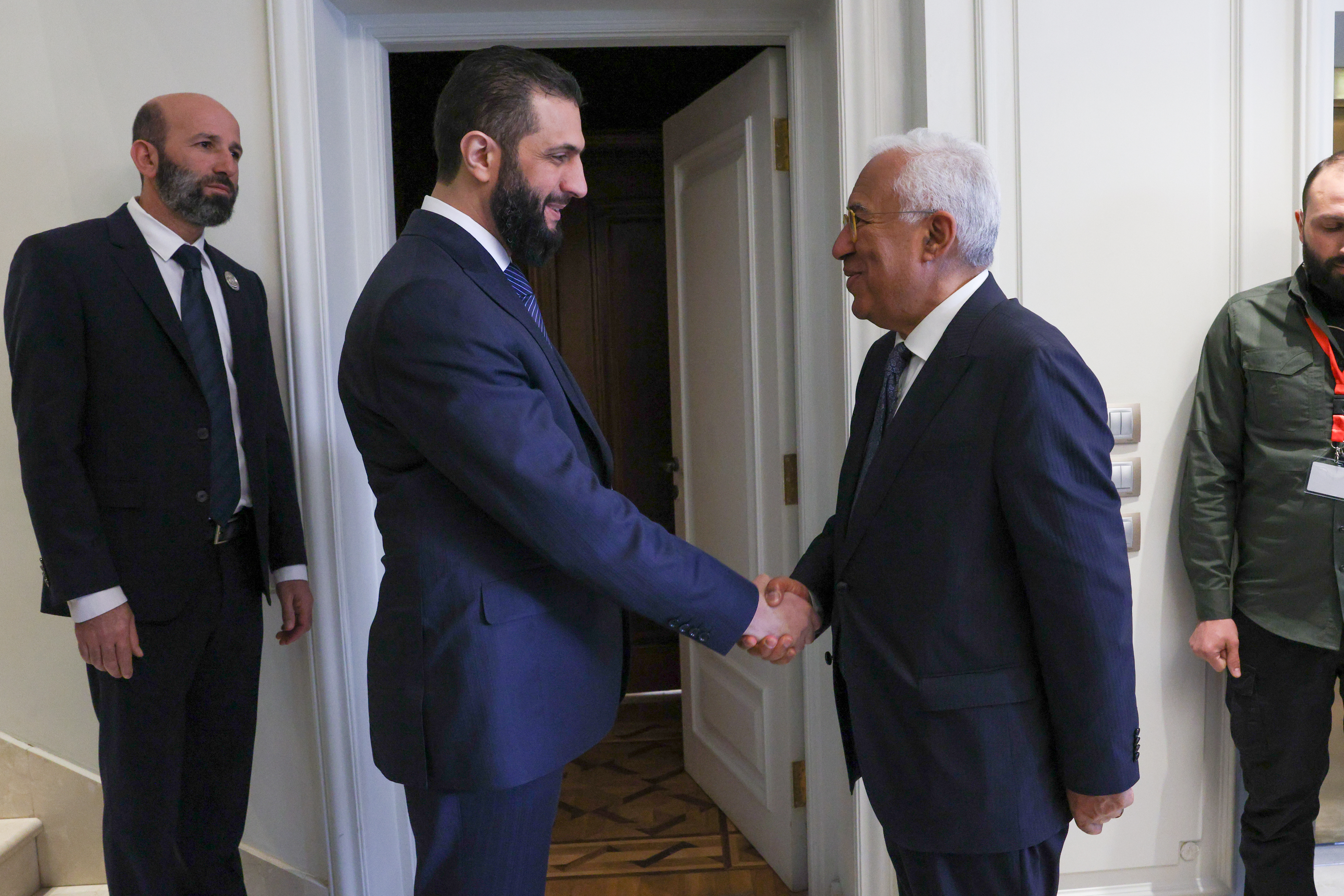
Syrian President Ahmed al-Sharaa (left) with European Council President António Costa at the Arab League summit on Gaza, in Cairo, 3 March 2025

On 8 December 2024, Syrian Prime Minister Mohammad Ghazi al-Jalali announced that the Syrian government would hand over power to a new elected government following the departure of Assad from Damascus, and Ahmed al-Sharaa announced further that al-Jalali will "supervise state institutions until they are handed over". Al-Jalali later noted to Al Arabiya that he and Ahmed al-Sharaa had been in contact prior to the announcement to discuss the handover.

Al-Sharaa subsequently became the country's de facto leader as head of the HTS. On 9 December, HTS released a video of al-Sharaa, al-Jalali and Mohammed al-Bashir, the head of the de facto government in Idlib. On the same day, following the fall of the Assad regime, the Prime Minister of the Syrian Salvation Government, al-Bashir, was tasked with forming a transitional government after meeting with al-Sharaa and outgoing Syrian Prime Minister al-Jalali to coordinate the transfer of power. The next day, he was officially appointed by the Syrian General Command as the prime minister of the transitional government.

Shortly after the fall of the Assad regime, Israel commenced a ground invasion of the Purple Line buffer zone near the Golan Heights, as well as commencing a series of airstrikes against Syrian military depots and naval bases. The Israeli Defense Forces claims that it is destroying Ba'athist military infrastructure, including chemical weapons plants, so that the rebels cannot use them. Despite the collapse of the Assad regime, Turkish-backed Syrian National Army fighters in northern Syria continued their offensive against U.S.-backed Syrian Democratic Forces (SDF) forces until a ceasefire was reached on 11 December.

After the regime change, al-Sharaa was formally appointed as the President of Syria by the Syrian General Command for the transitional period during the Syrian Revolution Victory Conference in Damascus on 29 January 2025. On 8 March 2025, the UK-based SOHR reported that Syrian security forces and pro-government fighters had committed a massacre of more than 700 Alawite civilians during clashes in western Syria. On 10 March 2025, the SDF agreed to merge with the Syrian Armed Forces after SDF leader Mazloum Abdi met with al-Sharaa. Three days later al-Sharaa signed an interim constitution covering a five-year transitional period.

On 29 March 2025, the Syrian transitional government was announced by al-Sharaa at a ceremony at the Presidential Palace, Damascus, in which the new ministers were sworn in and delivered speeches outlining their agendas. The government replaced the Syrian caretaker government, which was formed following the fall of the Assad regime.

== See also ==
- Franco-Syrian Treaty of Independence (1936)
- History of the Levant
- History of Asia
- History of Damascus
- History of the Middle East
- List of presidents of Syria
- List of prime ministers of Syria
- Ottoman Syria
- Rulers of Damascus
- Politics of Syria
- Syria
- Syrian Social Nationalist Party
- Timeline of Syrian history

== Bibliography ==
- (See pp. 308–309.)
- Fedden, Robin (1955). Syria: an historical appreciation. London: Readers Union — Robert Hale.
- Hinnebusch, Raymond (2002). Syria: Revolution from Above. Routledge. ISBN 0-415-28568-2.
- Zisser, Eyal (2007). Commanding Syria: Bashar Al-Asad And the First Years in Power. I.B. Tauris. ISBN 978-1-84511-153-3.
