= 1991 Syrian presidential election =

- 2 December 1991
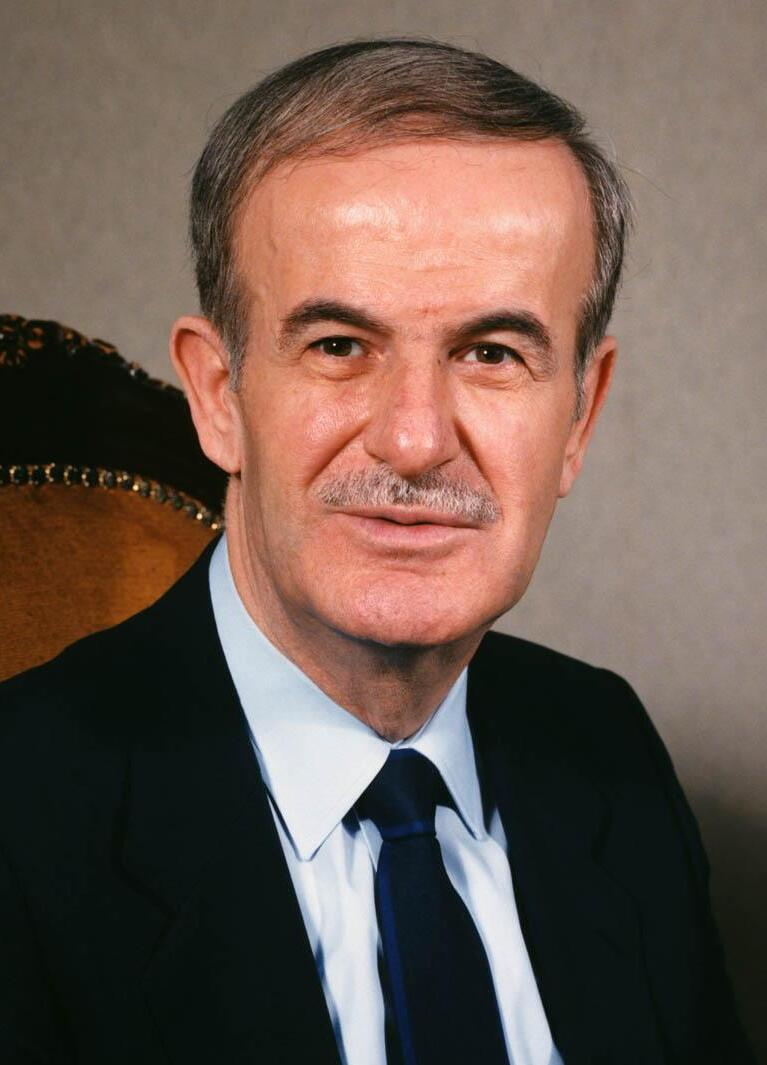
Nominee	Hafez al-Assad
Party	Ba'ath Party
Alliance	NPF
Popular vote	6,726,843
Percentage	99.99%
- Results by governorate Assad: 90–100% Election not held

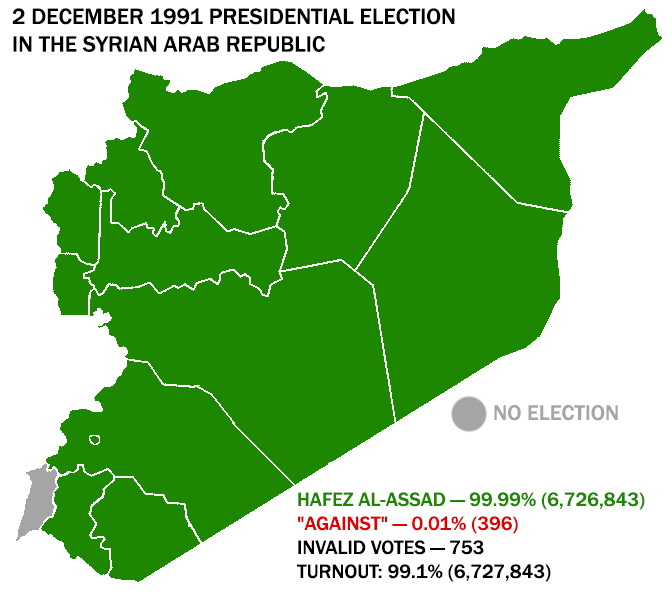
- Another variant of the presidential election 1985 results, which includes "against" and "invalid votes".
President before election
Hafez al-Assad
Ba'ath Party
Elected President
Hafez al-Assad
Ba'ath Party

Presidential elections were held in Syria on 2 December 1991. There was only one candidate, Hafez al-Assad, with voters asked to approve or reject his candidacy. A reported 99.99% of voters voted in favour, with a turnout of 99.1%.

== Results ==
Candidate	Party	Votes	%
Hafez al-Assad	Ba'ath Party	6,726,843	99.99
Against		396	0.01
Total		6,727,239	100.00
Valid votes		6,727,239	99.99
Invalid/blank votes		753	0.01
Total votes		6,727,992	100.00
Registered voters/turnout		6,786,193	99.14
Source: Nohlen et al.
