= 5th Chamber of Deputies of Syria =

Legislative term of Syria's parliament from 1950 to 1951, and 1954

5th Chamber of Deputies
←	Const.	6th (1953–1954); 6th (1954–1958)	→

Overview
- Legislative body: Chamber of Deputies
- Jurisdiction: Syria
- Meeting place: Chamber of Deputies Building, Damascus
- Term: 5 September 1950 – 2 December 1951; 15 March – 28 July 1954
- Election: –
- Government: al-Qudsi III (until 27 March 1951); K. al-Azm IV (27 March – 9 August 1951); al-Hakim II (9 August – 28 November 1951); al-Dawalibi I (28 November – 1 December 1951); al-Asali I (15 March – 19 June 1954); al-Ghazzi I (from 19 June 1954)
- Members: 114
- Speaker: Rushdi al-Kikhya (People's Party) (until 24 March 1951); Maarouf al-Dawalibi (People's Party) (23 June – 30 September 1951); Nazim al-Qudsi (People's Party) (1 October – 2 December 1951, from 15 March 1954)

Sessions
- 1st: 1 October – 30 December 1950
- 2nd: 1–29 March 1951
- 3rd: 21 May – 28 June 1951
- 4th: 1 October – 2 December 1951; 15 March – 28 July 1954

Special sessions
- 1st: 5–11 September 1950
- 2nd: 3–31 January 1951
- 3rd: 14 July – 27 September 1951

The Fifth Chamber of Deputies (Arabic: مجلس النواب للدور الاشتراعي الخامس, romanized: Majlis al-Nuwwāb lil-dawr al-ishtirāʻī al-khāmis) was the first parliament of the Second Syrian Republic. It emerged from the conversion of the Constituent Assembly following the adoption of the 1950 constitution.

The Chamber of Deputies continued to exercise its legislative duties until its dissolution in 1951 after Shishakli's coup in November. Following the overthrow of Adib Shishakli in 1954 and the reintroduction of the 1950 Constitution, this legislature returned to exercising its legislative duties until the end of its term and the holding of new parliamentary elections.

== Bureau ==
Position	Name	Party	Tenure
Speaker	Rushdi al-Kikhya	People's Party	5 September 1950 – 24 March 1951
Speaker	Maarouf al-Dawalibi	People's Party	23 June – 30 September 1951
Speaker	Nazim al-Qudsi	People's Party	1 October – 2 December 1951; 15 March – 28 July 1954
Deputy Speaker	Zaki al-Khatib	People's Party	5–30 September 1950
Deputy Speaker	Raif al-Malqi	Independent	5–30 September 1950
Deputy Speaker	Said Haydar		1 October 1950 – 30 September 1951
Deputy Speaker	Mustafa al-Siba'i	Muslim Brotherhood	1 October 1950 – 2 December 1951; 15 March – 28 July 1954
Deputy Speaker	Said Ishaq		30 September – 2 December 1951; 15 March – 28 July 1954
Secretary	Esber al-Yaziji		5 September 1950 – 30 September 1951
Secretary	Abd al-Salam Haydar		5 September 1950 – 30 September 1951
Secretary	Muhammad al-Shawwaf	People's Party	1 October – 2 December 1951; 15 March – 28 July 1954
Secretary	Muhammad Ashuri		1 October – 2 December 1951; 15 March – 28 July 1954
Overseer	Said Ishaq		5–30 September 1950
Overseer	Ahmad Qanbar	People's Party	5–30 September 1950
Overseer	Abd al-Qadir Rahmu		5 September 1950 – 2 December 1951; 15 March – 28 July 1954
Overseer	Muhammad Jamil al-Abdullah		1 October 1950 – 30 September 1951
Overseer	Abd al-Latif al-Sibahi	People's Party	1 October 1950 – 30 September 1951
Overseer	Abdullah al-Tamer	People's Party	1 October – 2 December 1951; 15 March – 28 July 1954
Overseer	Hamid Naji		1 October – 2 December 1951; 15 March – 28 July 1954

== Elections of the Bureau ==
=== 1 October 1950 ===
The Chamber of Deputies elected its bureau on the first sitting of the 1st ordinary session on 1 October 1950.

Election of the Speaker
Candidate	Party	Votes	%
Rushdi al-Kikhya	People's Party	66	94.29
Ahmad Qanbar	People's Party	2	2.86
Fares al-Khoury	People's Party	1	1.43
Jalal al-Sayyid	Arab Ba'ath Movement	1	1.43
Total		70	100.00
Valid votes		70	79.55
Invalid/blank votes		18	20.45
Total votes		88	100.00
Registered voters/turnout		114	77.19

Election of the Deputy Speakers
Candidate	Party	First round		Second round	
Candidate	Party	Votes	%	Votes	%
Said Haydar		42	48.28	45	43.27
Mustafa al-Siba'i	Muslim Brotherhood	40	45.98	44	42.31
Muhammad al-Mubarak	Muslim Brotherhood	11	12.64	5	4.81
Hamid Naji		7	8.05	10	9.62
Abd al-Baqi Nizam ad-Din	People's Party	6	6.90		
Faiq Manan Ismail Zadeh		2	2.30		
Qasim al-Ayish		2	2.30		
Jalal al-Sayyid	Arab Ba'ath Movement	1	1.15		
Faydi al-Atassi	People's Party	1	1.15		
Abd al-Qadir Rahmu	People's Party	1	1.15		
Raif al-Malqi	Independent	1	1.15		
Abdul-Wahab Hawmad	People's Party	1	1.15		
Total		115	100.00	104	100.00
Valid votes		60	68.97	63	74.12
Invalid/blank votes		27	31.03	22	25.88
Total votes		87	100.00	85	100.00
Registered voters/turnout		114	76.32	114	74.56

Election of the Secretaries
Candidate	Party	Votes	%
Esber al-Yaziji		58	67.44
Abd al-Salam Haydar		54	62.79
Hamid al-Khoja	Independent	4	4.65
Hamid Naji		3	3.49
Khalil Bashur		3	3.49
Ratib al-Husami	People's Party	2	2.33
Faydi al-Atassi	People's Party	2	2.33
Ismat Bozan Shahin		2	2.33
Muhammad al-Ashuri		1	1.16
Hayil al-Surur		1	1.16
Abd al-Latif al-Miqdad	Independent	1	1.16
Muhammad Junayd		1	1.16
Muhammad al-Mubarak	Muslim Brotherhood	1	1.16
Abd al-Qadir Rahmu	People's Party	1	1.16
Issam al-Mahayiri	SSNP	1	1.16
Total		135	100.00
Valid votes		86	100.00
Invalid/blank votes		0	0.00
Total votes		86	100.00
Registered voters/turnout		114	75.44

Election of the Overseers
Candidate	Party	Votes	%
Abd al-Qadir Rahmu	People's Party	59	71.08
Muhammad Jamil al-Abdullah		50	60.24
Abd al-Latif al-Sibahi	People's Party	46	55.42
Total		155	100.00
Valid votes		73	87.95
Invalid/blank votes		10	12.05
Total votes		83	100.00
Registered voters/turnout		114	72.81

=== 23 June 1951 ===
Following the resignation of Rushdi al-Kikhya from the speakership, the Chamber of Deputies elected a new speaker on 23 June 1951.

Election of the Speaker
Candidate	Party	First round		Second round	
Candidate	Party	Votes	%	Votes	%
Maarouf al-Dawalibi	People's Party	55	48.25	57	50.00
Abd al-Baqi Nizam ad-Din	People's Party	38	33.33	37	32.46
Husni al-Barazi	Independent	1	0.88		
Total		94	100.00	94	100.00
Valid votes		94	95.92	94	94.95
Invalid/blank votes		4	4.08	5	5.05
Total votes		98	100.00	99	100.00
Registered voters/turnout		114	85.96	114	86.84

=== 1 October 1951 ===
The Chamber of Deputies reelected its bureau on the first sitting of the 3rd ordinary session on 1 October 1951.

Election of the Speaker
Candidate	Party	Votes	%
Nazim al-Qudsi	People's Party	75	65.79
Maarouf al-Dawalibi	People's Party	1	0.88
Namiq Mustafa		1	0.88
Total		77	100.00
Valid votes		77	92.77
Invalid/blank votes		6	7.23
Total votes		83	100.00
Registered voters/turnout		114	72.81

Election of the Deputy Speakers
Candidate	Party	First round		Second round	
Candidate	Party	Votes	%	Votes	%
Said Ishaq		64	56.14		
Mustafa al-Siba'i	Muslim Brotherhood	55	48.25	55	48.25
Said Haydar		13	11.40	23	20.18
Munir al-Ajlani	Independent	5	4.39		
Husni al-Barazi	Independent	3	2.63		
Saleh Ramadan		3	2.63		
Latif Ghanima	People's Party	3	2.63		
Total		146	100.00	78	100.00
Valid votes		82	94.25	88	100.00
Invalid/blank votes		5	5.75	0	0.00
Total votes		87	100.00	88	100.00
Registered voters/turnout		114	76.32	114	77.19

Election of the Secretaries
Candidate	Party	First round		Second round	
Candidate	Party	Votes	%	Votes	%
Muhammad al-Shawwaf	People's Party	59	51.75		
Muhammad al-Ashuri		55	48.25	56	49.12
Ahmad Ali Kamil	Independent			4	3.51
Total		114	100.00	60	100.00
Valid votes		71	81.61	73	84.88
Invalid/blank votes		16	18.39	13	15.12
Total votes		87	100.00	86	100.00
Registered voters/turnout		114	76.32	114	75.44

Election of the Overseers
Candidate	Party	First round		Second round	
Candidate	Party	Votes	%	Votes	%
Abd al-Qadir Rahmu		65	57.02		
Abdullah al-Tamer	People's Party	58	50.88		
Hamid Naji		46	40.35	58	50.88
Abd al-Latif al-Yunis	National Party	20	17.54		
Total		189	100.00	58	100.00
Valid votes		76	90.48	66	82.50
Invalid/blank votes		8	9.52	14	17.50
Total votes		84	100.00	80	100.00
Registered voters/turnout		114	73.68	114	70.18

== Committees ==
=== 1st Ordinary Session ===
The Chamber's committees were elected for the first ordinary session on 3 October 1950. Deputies were divided into three parliamentary sections to elect the committee members. On 8 and 9 October, these committees elected their Bureaux as follows:

Committees	Burea		Party
Agriculture Committee	Chair	Abd al-Aziz al-Hallaj	People's Party
Agriculture Committee	Vice-Chair	Muhammad al-Ashuri	
Agriculture Committee	Rapporteur	Jadallah Izz al-Din	
Budget Committee	Chair	Qasim al-Hunaydi	
Budget Committee	Vice-Chair	Mustafa al-Siba'i	Muslim Brotherhood
Budget Committee	Rapporteur	Rizqallah Antaki	People's Party
Constitution Committee	Chair	Said Haydar	
Constitution Committee	Vice-Chair	Hamid Naji	
Constitution Committee	Rapporteur	Abdul-Wahab Hawmad	People's Party
Education Committee	Chair	Muhammad al-Mubarak	Muslim Brotherhood
Education Committee	Vice-Chair	Abd al-Latif al-Miqdad	Independent
Education Committee	Rapporteur	Ratib al-Husami	People's Party
Financial Laws Committee	Chair	Raif al-Malqi	Independent
Financial Laws Committee	Vice-Chair	Muhammad al-Shawwaf	People's Party
Financial Laws Committee	Rapporteur	Rizqallah Salem	
Foreign Affairs Committee	Chair	Jalal al-Sayyid (until 16 Oct 1950)	Arab Ba'ath Movement
Foreign Affairs Committee	Chair	Faydi al-Atassi (from 17 Oct 1950)	People's Party
Foreign Affairs Committee	Vice-Chair	Mustafa al-Siba'i (until 16 Oct 1950)	Muslim Brotherhood
Foreign Affairs Committee	Vice-Chair	Jalal al-Sayyid (from 17 Oct 1950)	Arab Ba'ath Movement
Foreign Affairs Committee	Rapporteur	Abdul-Wahab Hawmad	People's Party
Health and Ambulance Committee	Chair	Dikran Jerejian	People's Party
Health and Ambulance Committee	Vice-Chair	Aref al-Turuqji	
Health and Ambulance Committee	Rapporteur	Muhammad al-Ashuri	
Interior Committee	Chair	Hikmat al-Hiraki	Independent
Interior Committee	Vice-Chair	Dikran Jerejian	People's Party
Interior Committee	Rapporteur	Adil al-Kikhya	
Judicial Committee	Chair	Faydi al-Atassi	People's Party
Judicial Committee	Vice-Chair	Raif al-Malqi	Independent
Judicial Committee	Rapporteur	Muhammad Ata al-Jirudi	
National Defense Committee	Chair	Subhi al-Umari	
National Defense Committee	Vice-Chair	Farid Marhaj	
National Defense Committee	Rapporteur	Abdullah al-Tamer	People's Party
National Economy Committee	Chair	Maarouf al-Dawalibi	People's Party
National Economy Committee	Vice-Chair	Hanna Sawaya	
National Economy Committee	Rapporteur	Abd al-Hasib Raslan	Independent
Petitions Committee	Chair	Abd al-Hasib Raslan	Independent
Petitions Committee	Vice-Chair	Qasim al-Ayish	
Petitions Committee	Rapporteur	Ratib al-Husami	People's Party
Public Works and Transportation Committee	Chair	Abd al-Latif al-Yunis	National Party
Public Works and Transportation Committee	Vice-Chair	Nazim al-Kayyali	National Party
Public Works and Transportation Committee	Rapporteur	Abd al-Latif al-Sibahi	People's Party

=== 3rd Ordinary Session ===
The Chamber's committees were elected for the third ordinary session on 2 and 3 October 1951.

Committees	Burea		Party
Agriculture Committee	Chair		
Agriculture Committee	Vice-Chair		
Agriculture Committee	Rapporteur		
Budget Committee	Chair		
Budget Committee	Vice-Chair		
Budget Committee	Rapporteur		
Constitution Committee	Chair	Said Haydar	
Constitution Committee	Vice-Chair		
Constitution Committee	Rapporteur	Issam al-Mahayiri	SSNP
Education Committee	Chair		
Education Committee	Vice-Chair		
Education Committee	Rapporteur		
Financial Laws Committee	Chair		
Financial Laws Committee	Vice-Chair		
Financial Laws Committee	Rapporteur		
Foreign Affairs Committee	Chair	Maarouf al-Dawalibi	People's Party
Foreign Affairs Committee	Vice-Chair		
Foreign Affairs Committee	Rapporteur	Munir al-Ajlani	Independent
Health and Ambulance Committee (Bureau elected on 6 Oct)	Chair	Dikran Jerejian	People's Party
Health and Ambulance Committee (Bureau elected on 6 Oct)	Vice-Chair	Muhammad al-Ashuri	
Health and Ambulance Committee (Bureau elected on 6 Oct)	Rapporteur	Aref al-Turuqji	
Interior Committee	Chair		
Interior Committee	Vice-Chair		
Interior Committee	Rapporteur		
Judicial Committee (Bureau elected on 6 Oct)	Chair	Hamid Naji	
Judicial Committee (Bureau elected on 6 Oct)	Vice-Chair	Latif Ghanima	People's Party
Judicial Committee (Bureau elected on 6 Oct)	Rapporteur	Muhammad Ata al-Jirudi	
National Defense Committee	Chair		
National Defense Committee	Vice-Chair		
National Defense Committee	Rapporteur		
National Economy Committee (Bureau elected on 23 Oct)	Chair	Abd al-Rahman al-Azm	
National Economy Committee (Bureau elected on 23 Oct)	Vice-Chair	Hanna Sawaya	
National Economy Committee (Bureau elected on 23 Oct)	Rapporteur	Abd al-Hasib Raslan	Independent
Petitions Committee (Bureau elected on 23 Oct)	Chair	Abd al-Hasib Raslan	Independent
Petitions Committee (Bureau elected on 23 Oct)	Vice-Chair	Ibrahim Tayfur	
Petitions Committee (Bureau elected on 23 Oct)	Rapporteur	Muhammad Nadim al-Mallah	
Public Works and Transportation Committee	Chair		
Public Works and Transportation Committee	Vice-Chair		
Public Works and Transportation Committee	Rapporteur		

== Political crisis and dissolution ==
Political tensions escalated due to rivalry between political parties, particularly the People's Party and its opponents, and increasing dissatisfaction within the military.

On 29 November 1951, Adib Shishakli carried out a military coup, consolidating power and targeting civilian political leadership. A few days later, on 2 December 1951, Shishakli suspended the constitution, dissolved parliament, banned political parties.

President Hashim al-Atassi subsequently resigned, marking the end of parliamentary rule during this period.
