= Fawzi Selu government =

1952–1953 Syrian government

- 49th government of the Syrian Republic

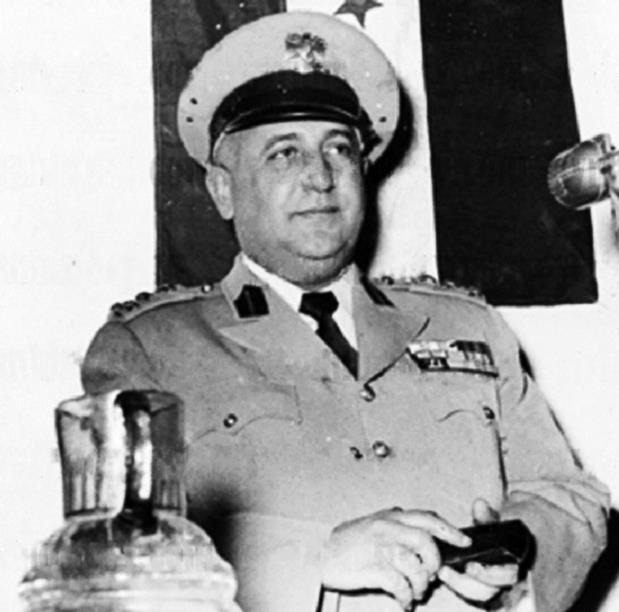
- Date formed: 9 June 1952
- Date dissolved: 11 July 1953

People and organisations
- Head of State: Fawzi Selu
- Prime Minister: Fawzi Selu
- No. of ministers: 9 (until Aug 1952); 10 (from Aug 1953)
- Member parties: ▌Arab Liberation Movement; ▌Independent

History
- Outgoing formation: 1953 presidential election
- Legislature term: None
- Predecessor: al-Dawalibi I (1951); Rule by decree (1951–1952)
- Successor: Shishakli

The Fawzi Selu government was the forty-ninth government in the history of modern Syria and the fifth administration of the Second Syrian Republic. Formed on 9 June 1952, it was the first government established after nearly seven months of direct rule by Fawzi Selu during the period following the second coup of Adib Shishakli, when the country had been governed without a formal cabinet.

The government was primarily tasked with overseeing Syria's political transition under the new constitutional order promoted by Shishakli. During its tenure, it supervised the referendum on the new constitution, commonly known as the Shishakli Constitution, and organised the presidential election. The election resulted in the victory of Adib Shishakli, who became President of the Republic under the new constitutional framework.

Following the completion of the presidential election and the inauguration of Shishakli, the government resigned in accordance with the provisions of the new constitution. Its tenure marked the institutional consolidation of the political system established after Shishakli's seizure of power and the transition from military rule to a presidential regime centred on his leadership.

== Composition ==
Portfolio	Minister	Took office	Left office
Prime Minister	Fawzi Selu	9 June 1952	11 July 1952
Minister of Interior	Fawzi Selu	9 June 1952	11 July 1953
Minister of National Defense	Fawzi Selu	9 June 1952	11 July 1953
Minister of Education	Sami Tayyarah	9 June 1952	11 July 1953
Minister of Health and Ambulance	Murshid Khateri	9 June 1952	11 July 1953
Minister of Foreign Affairs	Zafir al-Rifa'i	9 June 1952	11 July 1953
Minister of Finance	Said al-Za'im	9 June 1952	11 July 1953
Minister of National Economy	Munir Diyab	9 June 1952	11 July 1953
Minister of Agriculture	Abd al-Rahman al-Hunaydi	9 June 1952	11 July 1953
Minister of Justice	Munir Ghannam	9 June 1952	11 July 1953
Minister of Public Works and Transport	Tawfiq Harun	9 June 1952	11 July 1953
Deputy Prime Minister	Adib Shishakli	2 August 1952	11 July 1953
Minister of State	Adib Shishakli	2 August 1952	11 July 1953

== See also ==
- Council of Ministers (Syria)
- List of Syrian governments
- Government ministries of Syria
- List of prime ministers of Syria
