= First Maarouf al-Dawalibi government =

1951 Syrian government

- 48th government of the Syrian Republic
- Date formed: 28 November 1951
- Date dissolved: 1 December 1951

People and organisations
- President: Hashim al-Atassi
- Prime Minister: Maarouf al-Dawalibi
- No. of ministers: 11
- Member parties: ▌People's Party; ▌Muslim Brotherhood; ▌Independent
- Opposition parties: ▌National Party; ▌Ba'ath Party; ▌Arab Socialist Movement; ▌SSNP

History
- Outgoing formation: 1951 coup d'état
- Legislature term: 5th Chamber of Deputies
- Predecessor: al-Hakim II
- Successor: Rule by decree (1951–52); Selu (1952)

The First Maarouf al-Dawalibi government was the forty-eighth government in the history of modern Syria and the fourth administration of the Second Syrian Republic. Formed on 13 November 1951, it was the seventh and final government to serve during the first period of the second presidency of Hashim al-Atassi.

The government was opposed by senior military leaders from the outset because its prime minister was a member of the People's Party and had strained relations with the army command. As a result of the growing conflict between the civilian leadership and the military, the cabinet resigned only two weeks after its formation.

Following the resignation, Maarouf al-Dawalibi was tasked with forming a new government. However, al-Dawalibi refused to appoint a military officer rather than a civilian as Minister of Defence, leading to his arrest. The incident became known as the second coup of Adib Shishakli. In the aftermath, President Hashim al-Atassi resigned, and Fawzi Selu was granted extensive legislative and executive powers in addition to serving as head of state. His rule lasted for seven months, from 3 December 1951 to 9 June 1952, marking the consolidation of military control over Syrian politics.

== Composition ==
Portfolio	Minister	Took office	Left office	Party
Prime Minister	Maarouf al-Dawalibi	28 November 1951	1 December 1951	People's Party
Minister of National Defense	Maarouf al-Dawalibi	28 November 1951	1 December 1951	People's Party
Minister of Justice	Munir al-Ajlani	28 November 1951	1 December 1951	Independent
Minister of Education	Hani al-Sibai	28 November 1951	1 December 1951	People's Party
Minister of Interior	Ahmad Qanbar	28 November 1951	1 December 1951	People's Party
Minister of Agriculture	Muhammad al-Mubarak	12 August 1951	1 December 1951	Muslim Brotherhood
Minister of Foreign Affairs	Shakir al-Aas	28 November 1951	1 December 1951	People's Party
Minister of Finance	Abd al-Rahman al-Azm	28 November 1951	1 December 1951	Independent
Minister of National Economy	Ali Bozo	28 November 1951	1 December 1951	People's Party
Minister of Health and Ambulance	Muhammad al-Shawwaf	28 November 1951	1 December 1951	People's Party
Minister of Public Works and Transport	George Shahin	28 November 1951	1 December 1951	People's Party

== See also ==
- Council of Ministers (Syria)
- List of Syrian governments
- Government ministries of Syria
- List of prime ministers of Syria
