= Adib Shishakli government =

1953–1954 Syrian government

- 50th government of the Syrian Republic

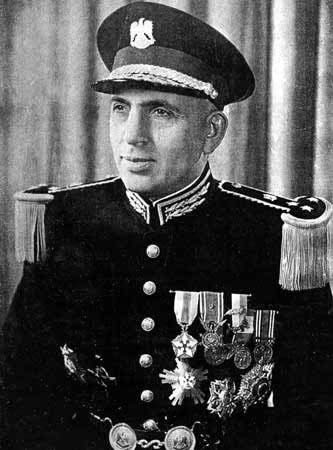
- Date formed: 19 July 1953
- Date dissolved: 1 March 1954

People and organisations
- President: Adib Shishakli
- No. of ministers: 10
- Member parties: ▌Arab Liberation Movement; ▌Independent

History
- Incoming formation: 1953 presidential election
- Outgoing formation: 1954 Syrian coup d'état
- Legislature term: 6th Chamber of Deputies
- Predecessor: Selu
- Successor: al-Asali I

The Adib Shishakli government was the fiftieth government in the history of modern Syria and the sixth administration of the Second Syrian Republic. Formed on 19 July 1953, it operated under the provisions of the 1953 Constitution, which vested executive authority in the President of the Republic and designated the president as head of government, drawing inspiration from the constitutional model of the United States.

The government represented the final phase of the political order established following the second coup of Adib Shishakli. During its tenure, the regime faced mounting opposition from a broad coalition of political parties, military officers, and regional leaders who objected to its increasingly authoritarian character. These tensions culminated in the 1954 coup, which was accompanied by widespread protests and political unrest across the country.

As opposition to the regime intensified, Shishakli relinquished power and departed Syria on 26 February 1954. The fall of his government brought an end to the Shishakli era and paved the way for the restoration of constitutional government and the return of civilian political institutions.

== Composition ==
Portfolio	Minister	Took office	Left office
Minister of Interior	Nuri al-Ibish	19 July 1953	1 March 1954
Minister of Agriculture	Abd al-Rahman al-Hunaydi	9 June 1952	1 March 1954
Minister of Health and Ambulance	Nazmi al-Qabbani	19 July 1953	1 March 1954
Minister of Justice	Asaad Mahasin	19 July 1953	1 March 1954
Minister of Foreign Affairs	Khalil Mardam Bey	19 July 1953	1 March 1954
Minister of Public Works and Transport	Fathallah Asyun	19 July 1953	1 March 1954
Minister of National Defense	Rifaat Khankan	19 July 1953	1 March 1954
Minister of Finance	George Shahin	19 July 1953	1 March 1954
Minister of National Economy	Awnallah al-Jabiri	19 July 1953	1 March 1954
Minister of Education	Anwar Ibrahim	19 July 1953	1 March 1954

== See also ==
- Council of Ministers (Syria)
- List of Syrian governments
- Government ministries of Syria
- List of prime ministers of Syria
