= First Sabri al-Asali government =

1954 Syrian government

- 51st government of the Syrian Republic

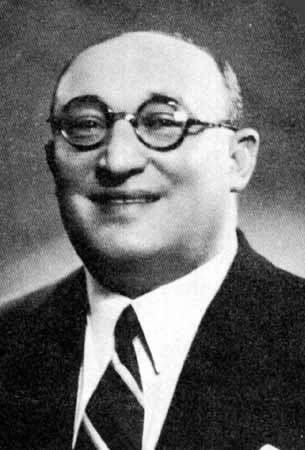
- Date formed: 1 March 1954
- Date dissolved: 19 June 1954

People and organisations
- President: Hashim al-Atassi
- Prime Minister: Sabri al-Asali
- No. of ministers: 12
- Member parties: ▌National Party; ▌People's Party; ▌Independent
- Opposition parties: ▌Muslim Brotherhood; ▌Ba'ath Party; ▌SSNP

History
- Incoming formation: 1954 Syrian coup d'état
- Legislature term: 5th Chamber of Deputies
- Predecessor: Shishakli
- Successor: al-Ghazzi I

The First Sabri al-Asali government was the fifty-first government in the history of modern Syria and the seventh administration of the Second Syrian Republic. Formed on 1 March 1954, it was the first government established following the overthrow of Adib Shishakli and the restoration of Hashim al-Atassi to complete his constitutional term as president. It was also the eighth government to serve during al-Atassi's second presidency.

== Composition ==
Portfolio	Minister	Took office	Left office	Party
Prime Minister	Sabri al-Asali	1 March 1954	19 June 1954	National Party
Minister of National Defense	Maarouf al-Dawalibi	1 March 1954	19 June 1954	People's Party
Minister of Foreign Affairs	Faydi al-Atassi	1 March 1954	19 June 1954	People's Party
Minister of Education	Munir al-Ajlani	1 March 1954	19 June 1954	Independent
Minister of Agriculture	Hasan al-Atrash	1 March 1954	19 June 1954	Independent
Minister of Finance	Abd al-Rahman al-Azm	1 March 1954	19 June 1954	Independent
Minister of Interior	Ali Bozo	1 March 1954	19 June 1954	People's Party
Minister of State	Afif al-Sulh	1 March 1954	19 June 1954	National Party
Minister of Health and Ambulance	Muhammad Sulayman al-Ahmad	1 March 1954	19 June 1954	National Party
Minister of Justice	Izzat al-Saqqal	1 March 1954	19 June 1954	National Party
Minister of National Economy	Fakhir al-Kayyali	1 March 1954	19 June 1954	National Party
Minister of Public Works and Transport	Rashad al-Jabiri	1 March 1954	19 June 1954	People's Party

== See also ==
- Council of Ministers (Syria)
- List of Syrian governments
- Government ministries of Syria
- List of prime ministers of Syria
