= Rashad Barmada =

Syrian Politician

- رشاد برمدا
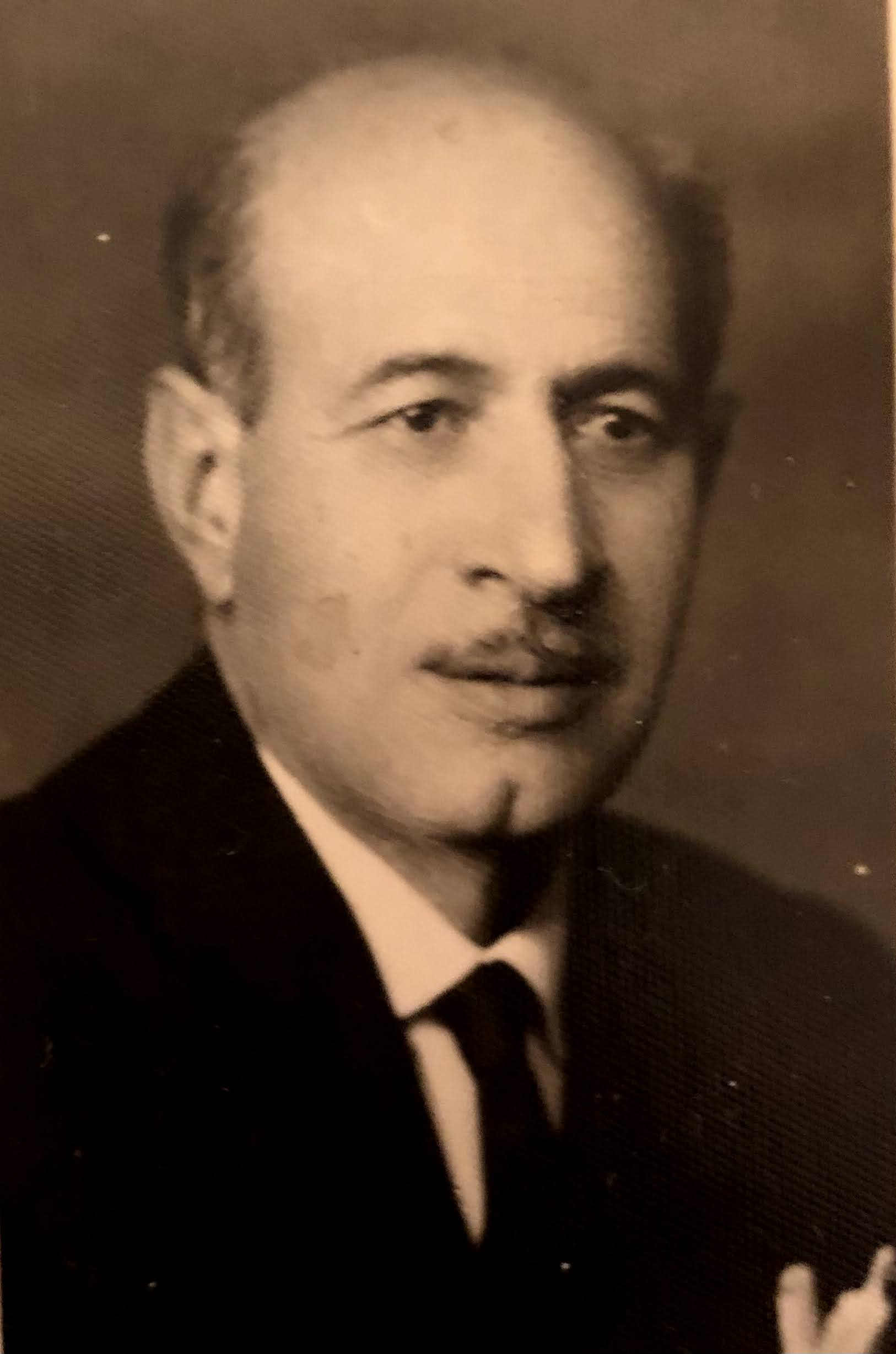

Deputy Prime Minister of Syria
- In office 16 April 1962 – 14 September 1962
- President: Nazim al-Kudsi
- Prime Minister: Bashir al-Azma
- Succeeded by: Bashir al-Azma

Minister of Defense
- In office 29 October 1954 – 13 February 1955
- President: Hashim al-Atassi
- Prime Minister: Fares al-Khoury
- Succeeded by: Khalid al-Azm
- In office 13 September 1955 – 14 June 1956
- President: Shukri al-Quwatli
- Prime Minister: Said al-Ghazzi
- In office 22 December 1961 – 27 March 1962
- President: Nazim al-Kudsi
- Prime Minister: Maarouf al-Dawalibi

Minister of Interior
- In office 4 June 1950 – 27 March 1951
- President: Hashim al-Atassi
- Prime Minister: Nazim al-Kudsi
- In office 9 August 1951 – 28 November 1951
- President: Hashim al-Atassi
- Prime Minister: Hassan al-Hakim

Minister of Education
- In office 22 December 1961 – 8 March 1963
- President: Nazim al-Kudsi

Personal details
- Born: 1913 Aleppo, Syria
- Died: August 16, 1988 (aged 74–75) Damascus, Syria
- Party: People's Party
- Spouse: Fatima Barmada
- Children: 6
- Relatives: Mustafa Bey Barmada (cousin); Riad Barmada (nephew)
- Education: Damascus University
- Occupation: Politician, lawyer

Rashad Barmada (Arabic: رشاد برمدا; 1913 – August 16, 1988) was a Syrian politician between the 1940s and early 1960s. Barmada served as a deputy prime minister, minister of defense for three terms, minister of interior for two terms, and minister of education for three terms, and was elected as a member of the Syrian Parliament for three terms (1947, 1954 and 1961). He was the President of the Aleppo Lawyers Syndicate in 1949.

== Early life and education ==
Rashad Barmada was born in 1913 and grew up in Aleppo. He was born to a notable Syrian family and the landlords of Harem. He studied law at Damascus University and graduated in 1937. He established a legal practice in Aleppo.

== Career ==
In 1947, he co-founded the People's Party, a political party that was created to counter and oppose the centralized regime of President Shukri al-Quawatli.

The People's Party accused Quwatli of nepotism, centralized administration, and favoritism toward the people of Damascus. The party was funded and supported by the commercial class in Aleppo and administered by Rushdi al-Kikhya and Nazim al-Qudsi. Its main objective was to create a healthy democracy in Syria and merge Syria and neighboring Iraq into one state.

In 1947, Barmada became a deputy for Aleppo in the Syrian Parliament. In 1949, he became the President of the Aleppo Lawyers Syndicate for less than one year; and in June 1950, Nazim al-Qudsi became prime minister and appointed him minister of interior. Barmada voiced his opposition to having a military officer serving in cabinet and called for the resignation of General Fawzi Selu, the minister of defense. He constantly clashed with Selu and tried to prevent him from controlling the gendarmerie, claiming that if he lost, the civilian government would lose all ability to enforce its will throughout the country. When Selu got his way and assumed control of the armed units, Barmada resigned from office in protest. He spoke out against the military regime of President Adib al Shishakli, who came to power in November 1951. Shishakli outlawed all political parties, including the People's Party. Barmada was arrested and incarcerated in the Mezzah prison in Damascus. When Shishakli was overthrown by a military coup in February 1954, Barmada was released from jail and appointed minister of defense in the cabinet of Prime minister Said al-Ghazzi.

In the second half of the 1950s, Barmada opposed the socialist policies of President Gamal Abdel al Nasser of Egypt and his meddling in the domestic affairs of Syria. In 1955, Shukri al-Quawatli was re-elected president and transformed Syria into an Egyptian satellite. He made friends with Nasser's allies in Eastern Europe and appointed socialist leaders to prominent positions in government. Barmada worked against him and called for a break from Egyptian influence.

In 1958, Syria and Egypt merged to form the United Arab Republic (UAR) and Barmada voiced his opposition to the new regime. Barmada was sidelined during the UAR era and supported the coup d'état that toppled it in September 1961. He joined a group of disgruntled politicians and drafted the 'secession' manifesto, declaring Syria's permanent break from the UAR and accusing Nasser of having established a dictatorship in Syria, but refused to form the first post-UAR government. He then allied himself with the post-union administration of his long-time friend and party comrade, Nazim al-Qudsi.

In December 1961, Barmada became minister of defense in the cabinet of Prime Minister Maarouf al-Dawalibi, and in March 1962, he became deputy to prime minister Bashir al-Azma. He also served as minister of education in the independent cabinet of Khalid al-Azm. From 1961 to 1963, Barmada served as a deputy for Aleppo in parliament.

In March 1963, Barmada's civil rights were terminated. He retired from political life and worked at his legal practice in Damascus.

In 1976, Barmada co-founded the human rights association in Syria. In 1980, he was arrested for 45 days by the Syrian authorities. Barmada suffered from poor health, apparently resulting from a chronic ailment he suffered following a previous spell of imprisonment in 1982 .

== Personal life ==
He married Fatima Barmada and had six children: Warka, Hassan, Jihad, Hala, Nour, and Assad.

== Death ==
He died on 16 August 1988 in Damascus, Syria.
