= 6th Chamber of Deputies of Syria (1953–1954) =

Legislative term of Syria's parliament from 1953 to 1954

6th Chamber of Deputies
←	5th	6th (1954–1958)	→

Overview
- Legislative body: Chamber of Deputies
- Jurisdiction: Syria
- Meeting place: Chamber of Deputies Building, Damascus
- Term: 24 October 1953 – 26 February 1954
- Election: 1953
- Government: Shishakli
- Members: 83
- Speaker: Maamun al-Kuzbari (Independent)

The Sixth Chamber of Deputies (Arabic: مجلس النواب للدور الاشتراعي السادس, romanized: Majlis al-Nuwwāb lil-dawr al-ishtirāʻī al-sādis) was the parliament of the Second Syrian Republic from October 1953 to February 1954. It was formed under the presidential regime of Adib Shishakli following the adoption of the 1953 constitution.

The chamber operated during a period of authoritarian rule and limited political participation, and was dissolved shortly after the 1954 coup.

== Background ==
On 10 July 1953, Adib Shishakli, acting in the name of the Supreme Military Council, promulgated a new constitution establishing a presidential system for the first time in Syria. This constitution, consisting of 129 articles, marked the first formal transition to a republic with strong executive powers vested in the president.

On 11 July 1953, Shishakli was elected President through a popular referendum as the sole candidate.

On 30 July 1953, a new electoral law was issued, reducing the number of parliamentary seats to 83 and regulating political activity. While some political participation was allowed, major opposition forces boycotted the process.

== Elections and formation ==
Parliamentary elections were held on 23 October 1953. The elections were largely boycotted by major political parties, resulting in a dominant victory for the Arab Liberation Movement (حركة التحرير العربي), the political party established by Shishakli.

The Chamber of Deputies in 1953.

== Bureau ==
Position	Name	Party	Tenure
Speaker	Maamun al-Kuzbari	Independent	24 October 1953 – 26 February 1954
Deputy Speaker	Said Ishaq		24 October 1953 – 26 February 1954
Secretary	Wajih al-Jabri		24 October 1953 – 26 February 1954
Secretary	Badr Marqabi		24 October 1953 – 26 February 1954
Secretary	Makram al-Jandali		24 October 1953 – 26 February 1954
Overseer	Jihad al-Hawwash		24 October 1953 – 26 February 1954
Overseer	Abd al-Latif al-Miqdad	Independent	24 October 1953 – 26 February 1954
Overseer	Muhammad Salih Abu Asali		24 October 1953 – 26 February 1954

== Dissolution ==
By early 1954, opposition to Shishakli intensified across Syria. Amid growing unrest and political pressure, Shishakli fled the country on 24 February 1954.

Shortly thereafter, on 26 February 1954, the Chamber of Deputies was dissolved, marking the end of the presidential system established in 1953 and paving the way for the restoration of parliamentary life.
