= Damascus (Chamber of Deputies electoral district) =

Former electoral district of Syria's national legislature

- Former electoral district for the Chamber of Deputies

Former electoral district
- Created: 1928
- Abolished: 1963
- Seats: List: 17 (1961–1963); 13 (1949–1953, 1954–1958); 9 (1953–1954); 18 (1947–1949); 16 (1943–1947); 14 (1928–1931, 1936–1943); 10 (1931–1936)
- Replaced by: Damascus

Damascus (Arabic: دمشق) was an electoral district used to elect members of the Syrian Chamber of Deputies between 1928 and 1963. The electoral district was first established as Damascus in 1928 for elections to the Constituent Assembly. In 1931, with the first elections to the newly-established Chamber of Deputies, it was renamed Damascus and its Suburbs. For the 1947 elections, it was renamed again Damascus – Centre and Suburbs, before being renamed one last time as Damascus in 1949. Beginning with the 1954 elections, the electoral district comprised only the city of Damascus, as a separate electoral district was created for Ghouta and the surrounding suburbs.

== Electoral system ==
Under the 1928 electoral system, Syria adopted its first formal electoral law after the Ottoman period and under the French Mandate. Promulgated by arrêté No. 1889 of High Commissioner Ponsot, the system created a two-tier indirect electoral system. Male citizens over the age of 21 would elect secondary electors, at a ratio of one elector per hundred first-tier voters, who would then elect members of parliament. The number of seats was determined before every election based on the proportional population size of each electoral district, with seats allocated across religious communities according to their numerical share. The system was criticised for entrenching the influence of local notables, elites, and landowners, with limited direct popular participation.

In 1947, the government of Jamil Mardam Bey introduced a new direct electoral system. The system was applied for the first time in the 1947 elections and was amended twice, in 1954 and 1961. It remained in force through the 1961 elections and until the fall of the Second Republic in 1963.

Until 1949, the electorate consisted of Syrian men aged 20 and over. Following Husni al-Za'im's seizure of power, the voting age was lowered to 18 and women were granted the right to vote. The subsequent Hashim al-Atassi government retained the lower voting age but restricted women's suffrage to literate women only, without the right to stand for election. It was not until the 1954 elections, held under the 1950 constitution, that women of all educational backgrounds were granted equal rights to vote and stand for office.

== Deputies ==
Elections	Deputy (Party)	Deputy (Party)	Deputy (Party)	Deputy (Party)	Deputy (Party)	Deputy (Party)	Deputy (Party)	Deputy (Party)	Deputy (Party)	Deputy (Party)	Deputy (Party)	Deputy (Party)	Deputy (Party)	Deputy (Party)	Deputy (Party)	Deputy (Party)	Deputy (Party)	Deputy (Party)
1928	Taj al-Din al-Hasani (Ind.)	Fawzi al-Ghazzi (NB)	Ihsan al-Sharif (NB)	Lutfi al-Haffar (Until 1947: NB; From 1948: NP)	Fakhri al-Baroudi (NB)	Nasib al-Bakri (Until 1947: NB; From 1948: PP)	Youssef Leniado (Ind.)	Zaki al-Khatib (NB)	Fayez al-Khoury (NB)	Said al-Ghazzi (NB)	Ahmad al-Lahham (NB)	Fawzi al-Bakri (NB)	Abd al-Qadir al-Khatib (N/A)	George Sahnawi (N/A)	14 seats			
1931–32	Haqqi al-Azm (Ind.)	Jamil Mardam Bey (Until 1947: NB; From 1947: Ind.)	Ihsan al-Sharif (NB)	Lutfi al-Haffar (Until 1947: NB; From 1948: NP)	Fakhri al-Baroudi (NB)	Nasib al-Bakri (Until 1947: NB; From 1948: PP)	Youssef Leniado (Ind.)	Zaki al-Khatib (NB)	Fayez al-Khoury (NB)	Muhammad Ali al-Abid (Ind.)	10 seats							
1933 by-election	Haqqi al-Azm (Ind.)	Jamil Mardam Bey (Until 1947: NB; From 1947: Ind.)	Ihsan al-Sharif (NB)	Lutfi al-Haffar (Until 1947: NB; From 1948: NP)	Fakhri al-Baroudi (NB)	Nasib al-Bakri (Until 1947: NB; From 1948: PP)	Youssef Leniado (Ind.)	Zaki al-Khatib (NB)	Fayez al-Khoury (NB)	N/A	10 seats							
1936	Shukri al-Quwatli (NB)	Jamil Mardam Bey (Until 1947: NB; From 1947: Ind.)	Ihsan al-Sharif (NB)	Lutfi al-Haffar (Until 1947: NB; From 1948: NP)	Fakhri al-Baroudi (NB)	Nasib al-Bakri (Until 1947: NB; From 1948: PP)	Youssef Leniado (Ind.)	Munir al-Ajlani (NB)	Fayez al-Khoury (NB)	Sabri al-Asali (Until 1947: NB; From 1948: NP)	Ahmad al-Lahham (NB)	Afif al-Sulh (NB)	Fares al-Khoury (Until 1947: NB; From 1948: PP)	George Sahnawi (N/A)	14 seats			
1943	Shukri al-Quwatli (NB)	Jamil Mardam Bey (Until 1947: NB; From 1947: Ind.)	Nasuhi al-Bukhari (Ind.)	Lutfi al-Haffar (Until 1947: NB; From 1948: NP)	Abd al-Hamid al-Tibba (N/A)	Nasib al-Bakri (Until 1947: NB; From 1948: PP)	Khalid al-Azm (Ind.)	Najib al-Rayyes (N/A)	Ahmad al-Sharabati (Until 1947: NB; From 1947: Ind.)	Sabri al-Asali (Until 1947: NB; From 1948: NP)	Nazrit Yaaqubian (N/A)	Afif al-Sulh (NB)	Fares al-Khoury (Until 1947: NB; From 1948: PP)	George Sahnawi (N/A)	Said al-Ghazzi (Until 1947: NB; From 1947: Ind.)	Na'im al-Antaki (NB)	16 seats	
1943 by-election	Fakhri al-Baroudi (NB)	Jamil Mardam Bey (Until 1947: NB; From 1947: Ind.)	Nasuhi al-Bukhari (Ind.)	Lutfi al-Haffar (Until 1947: NB; From 1948: NP)	Abd al-Hamid al-Tibba (N/A)	Nasib al-Bakri (Until 1947: NB; From 1948: PP)	Khalid al-Azm (Ind.)	Najib al-Rayyes (N/A)	Ahmad al-Sharabati (Until 1947: NB; From 1947: Ind.)	Sabri al-Asali (Until 1947: NB; From 1948: NP)	Nazrit Yaaqubian (N/A)	Afif al-Sulh (NB)	Fares al-Khoury (Until 1947: NB; From 1948: PP)	George Sahnawi (N/A)	Said al-Ghazzi (Until 1947: NB; From 1947: Ind.)	Na'im al-Antaki (NB)	16 seats	
1947	Sami Kabbarah (Ind.)	Jamil Mardam Bey (Until 1947: NB; From 1947: Ind.)	Muhammad al-Mubarak (MB)	Lutfi al-Haffar (Until 1947: NB; From 1948: NP)	Munir al-Ajlani (Ind.)	Nasib al-Bakri (Until 1947: NB; From 1948: PP)	Muhammad Aqbiq (N/A)	Zaki al-Khatib (Ind.)	Ahmad al-Sharabati (Until 1947: NB; From 1947: Ind.)	Sabri al-Asali (Until 1947: NB; From 1948: NP)	Nuri Ibbish (N/A)	Nuri al-Hakim (N/A)	Fares al-Khoury (Until 1947: NB; From 1948: PP)	George Sahnawi (N/A)	Said al-Ghazzi (Until 1947: NB; From 1947: Ind.)	Habib Kahala (NP)	Farid Arslanian (N/A)	Wahid Mizrahi (N/A)
1949	Sami Kabbarah (Ind.)	Mustafa al-Siba'i (MB)	Muhammad al-Mubarak (MB)	Hassan al-Hakim (Ind.)	Munir al-Ajlani (Ind.)	Aref al-Turuqji (N/A)	Ali Bozo (PP)	Zaki al-Khatib (Ind.)	Sa'id Haydar (N/A)	Issam al-Mahayiri (SSNP)	Subhi al-Umari (N/A)	Ilyas Dummar (N/A)	George Shalhub (PP)	13 seats				
1953	Munir Shura (ALM)	Maamun al-Kuzbari (Ind.)	Nuri al-Hakim (N/A)	Muhyi al-Din Baqla (N/A)	Hussein Hamza (N/A)	Munir al-Habl (N/A)	Fawzi al-Mufti (N/A)	Faiz al-Ustaz (N/A)	Yusuf Lous (N/A)	9 seats								
1954 (Mar) (Note: The parliament elected in 1949 was restored in March 1954 after the regime of Adib Shishakli was overthrown. Deputies resumed their seats until the end of the term in July.)	Sami Kabbarah (Ind.)	Mustafa al-Siba'i (MB)	Muhammad al-Mubarak (MB)	Hassan al-Hakim (Ind.)	Munir al-Ajlani (Ind.)	Aref al-Turuqji (N/A)	Ali Bozo (PP)	Zaki al-Khatib (Ind.)	Sa'id Haydar (N/A)	Issam al-Mahayiri (SSNP)	Subhi al-Umari (N/A)	Ilyas Dummar (N/A)	George Shalhub (PP)	13 seats				
1954 (Oct)	Khalid al-Azm (Ind.)	Maamun al-Kuzbari (Ind.)	Muhammad al-Mubarak (MB)	Khalid Bakdash (SCP)	Munir al-Ajlani (Ind.)	Sabri al-Asali (NP)	Ali Bozo (PP)	Said al-Ghazzi (Ind.)	Rashad Jabri (PP)	Suhail al-Khuri (NP)	Faisal al-Asali (SocCP)	Salah al-Din al-Bitar (Ba’ath)	George Shalhub (PP)	13 seats				
1957 by-election	Khalid al-Azm (Ind.)	Maamun al-Kuzbari (Ind.)	Muhammad al-Mubarak (MB)	Khalid Bakdash (SCP)	Riyad al-Malki (Ba'ath)	Sabri al-Asali (NP)	Ali Bozo (PP)	Said al-Ghazzi (Ind.)	Rashad Jabri (PP)	Suhail al-Khuri (NP)	Faisal al-Asali (SocCP)	Salah al-Din al-Bitar (Ba’ath)	George Shalhub (PP)	13 seats				
1961	Khalid al-Azm (Ind.)	Maamun al-Kuzbari (Ind.)	Issam al-Attar (MB)	Muhammad Abdin (Ind.)	Hussein Khattab (MB)	Sabri al-Asali (NP)	Fouad al-Adil (Ind.)	Said al-Ghazzi (Ind.)	Rashad Jabri (PP)	Suhail al-Khuri (NP)	Adnan al-Quwatli (NP)	Rashid ad-Duqr (Ind.)	Omar Awda al-Khatib (MB)	Zuhayr ash-Shawish (MB)	Bashir Ramadan (Ind.)	Awad Barakat (Ind.)	Hanin Sahnawi (Ind.)	17 seats
