= 1951 Syrian coup d'état =

Bloodless coup that overthrew Hashim al-Atassi

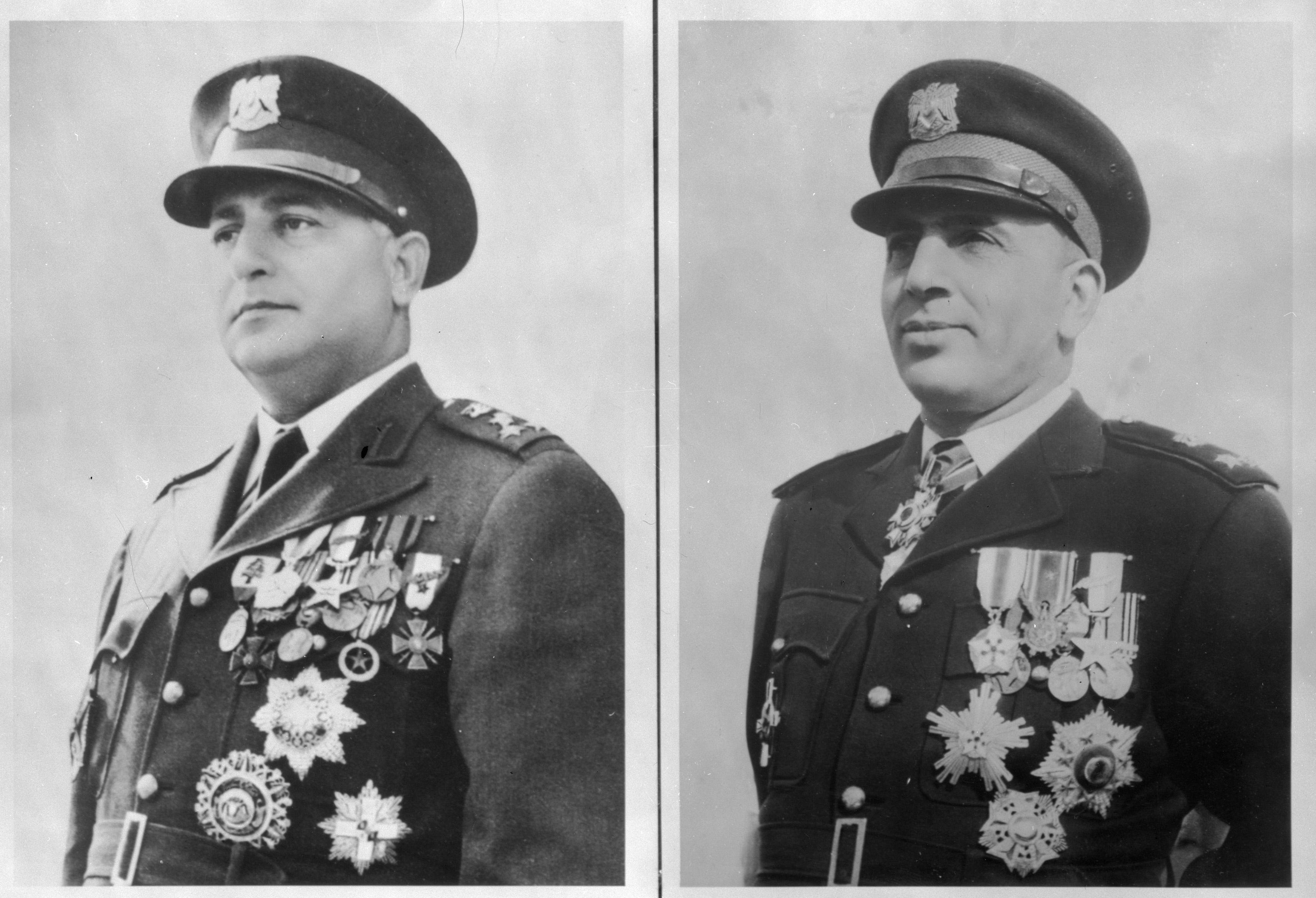
- Photos of Fawzi Selu and Adib Shishakli, 1951.
Date	29 November, 1951
Location	Syria
Result	President Hashim al-Atassi and his cabinet resign; Adib Shishakli still de facto governs

Belligerents
Syrian government	Syrian Armed Forces coup plotters Syrian Social Nationalist Party

Commanders and leaders
Hashim al-Atassi (President of Syria); Maarouf al-Dawalibi (Prime Minister of Syria); Nazim al-Qudsi	Adib Shishakli; Fawzi Selu

The 1951 Syrian coup d'état (Arabic: انقلاب 1951 في سوريا) was the fourth coup d'état in Syria following independence. The coup was led by Adib Shishakli, who forced the existing government, led by President Hashim al-Atassi and Prime Minister Maarouf al-Dawalibi to resign.

== Background ==
Following the December 1949 coup, Adib Shishakli wielded significant power in the country's governance. The People's Party, the largest party following the 1949 parliamentary election, could not govern due to military pressure. In 1950, the country saw experienced political instability due to weak governmental coalitions. President Hashim al-Atassi entrusted Nazim al-Qudsi, the leader of People's Party, with government formation against the military's wishes. Atassi successfully passed this coalition to govern. During the government's tenure, it signed a joint cooperation agreement with the Kingdom of Iraq, which the Prime Minister claimed was "a first step toward a federal union with Iraq."

== Process ==
Shishakli, who received support from Saudi Arabia, was displeased with this agreement. On November 29, 1951, Shishakli order the arrest of Prime Minister Maarouf al-Dawalibi due to his refusal to appoint Fawzi Selu, Shishakli's confidant, as defense secretary. Other government officials then announced their resignation. After failed negotiations for power sharing, president Hashim al-Atassi also resigned and returned to Homs. Following the resignation, the Syrian military's Command Council announced its assumption of power, who then dissolved the Syrian parliament and appointed Fawzi Selu with all executive and legislative powers.

== Aftermath ==
=== Domestic policies ===
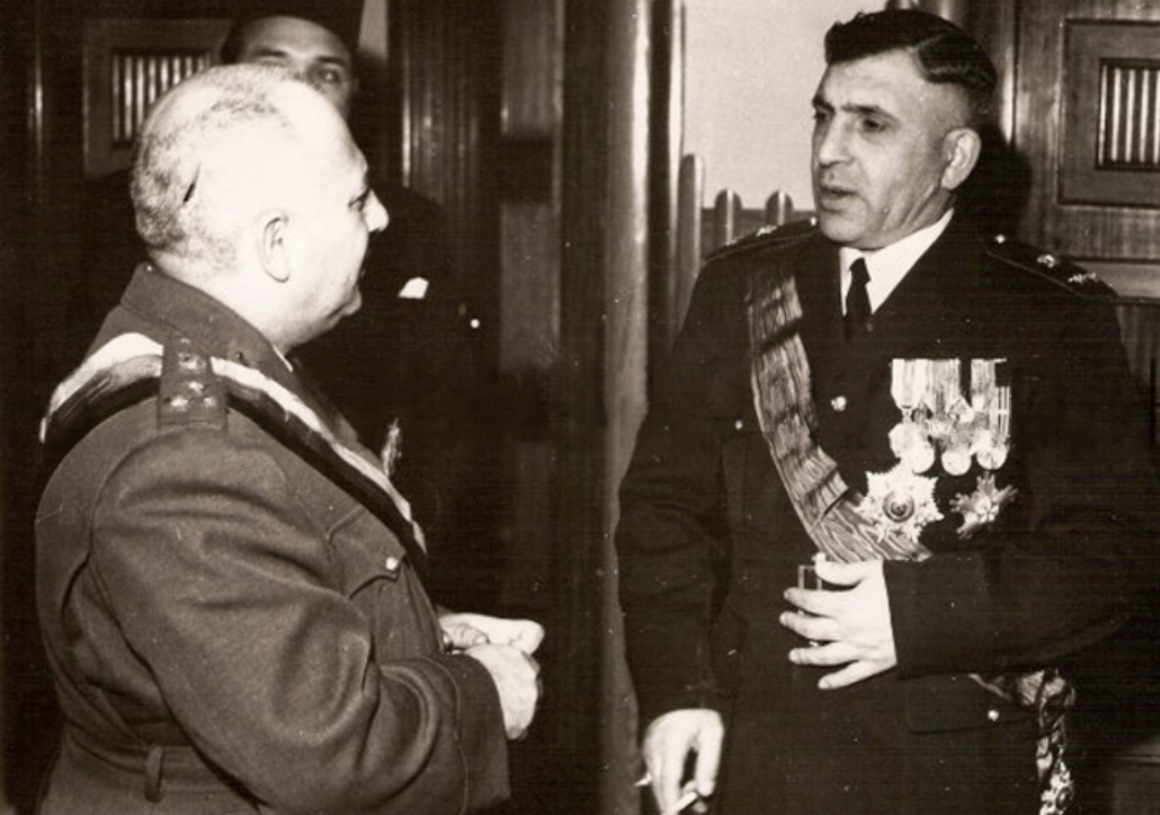
Selu and Shishakli in 1951

After the 1951 coup, Adib Shishakli focused on power consolidation. This included promulgating the Syrian Constitution of 1953 and organizing the 1953 presidential election, successfully establishing one-party rule for about two years. According to a Syrian activist, “Syrians no longer care about the army or who rules the country. All they care about now is the return of the stability that was absent before".

By 1953, Akram al-Hourani expanded his influence and even wanted to become president himself. As a result, Shishakli dismissed many officers who were loyal to Hourani, and refused to establish a socialist government as Hourani has hoped. Then, Hourani fled to Lebanon, where he merged his Arab Socialist Movement with the Ba'ath Party. The next year, Hourani supported the 1954 coup against Shishakli.

=== Foreign affairs ===
During his rule, Shishakli sought military aid from Western countries. He offered to renew the Trans-Arabian Pipeline and provide asylum for Palestinian refugees. However, the United States feared that Syrian rearmament would threaten Israel, and therefore refused. On the other hand, the U.S. delegation in Damascus was upgraded to embassy status on September 30, 1952 as a sign of improving relations.

== Bibliography ==
- Torrey, Gordon H. (1964). Syrian Politics and the Military 1945-1958. Columbus: Ohio State University Press. doi:10.2307/2146901.
