= First Said al-Ghazzi government =

1954 Syrian government

- 52nd government of the Syrian Republic

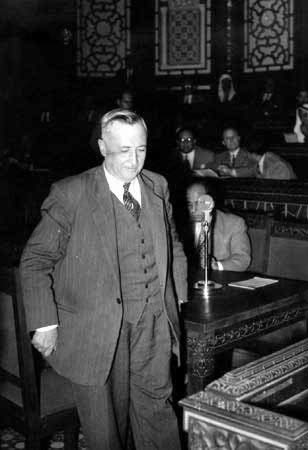
- Date formed: 19 June 1954
- Date dissolved: 29 October 1954

People and organisations
- President: Hashim al-Atassi
- Prime Minister: Said al-Ghazzi
- No. of ministers: 11
- Member parties: ▌National Party; ▌Independent

History
- Outgoing formation: 1954 parliamentary election
- Legislature term: None
- Predecessor: al-Asali I
- Successor: al-Khoury IV

The First Said al-Ghazzi government was the fifty-second government in the history of modern Syria and the eight administration of the Second Syrian Republic. Formed on 19 June 1954, it was the ninth government to serve during the second presidency of Hashim al-Atassi and the first government headed by Said al-Ghazzi.

The government was established as a transitional administration following the restoration of constitutional rule after the fall of the Adib Shishakli regime. Its principal responsibility was to organise and supervise the 1954 Syrian parliamentary election, which was intended to re-establish representative government and restore the country's parliamentary institutions.

Having fulfilled its mandate by overseeing the elections, the government resigned shortly thereafter in accordance with established constitutional practice. Its tenure marked an important stage in Syria's return to parliamentary politics following a period of military rule.

== Composition ==
Portfolio	Minister	Took office	Left office	Party
Prime Minister	Said al-Ghazzi	19 June 1954	29 October 1954	Independent
Minister of National Defense	Said al-Ghazzi	19 June 1954	29 October 1954	Independent
Minister of Foreign Affairs	Izzat al-Saqqal	19 June 1954	29 October 1954	National Party
Minister of Finance	Izzat al-Saqqal	19 June 1954	29 October 1954	National Party
Minister of Justice	Asaad al-Kurani	19 June 1954	29 October 1954	National Party
Minister of National Economy	Asaad al-Kurani	19 June 1954	29 October 1954	National Party
Minister of Education	Nihad al-Qasim	19 June 1954	29 October 1954	Independent
Minister of Agriculture	Nihad al-Qasim	19 June 1954	29 October 1954	Independent
Minister of Interior	Ismail Quli	19 June 1954	29 October 1954	Independent
Minister of Public Works and Transport	Nabih al-Ghazzi	19 June 1954	29 October 1954	Independent
Minister of Health and Ambulance	Nabih al-Ghazzi	19 June 1954	29 October 1954	Independent

== See also ==
- Council of Ministers (Syria)
- List of Syrian governments
- Government ministries of Syria
- List of prime ministers of Syria
