= Bahij al-Khatib =

Syrian politician

- بهيج الخطيب
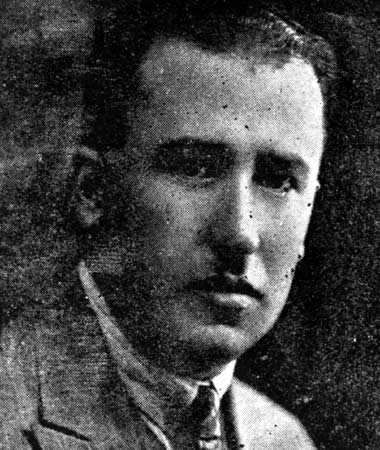

Head of State of Syria
- In office 8 July 1939 – 4 April 1941
- Preceded by: Hashim al-Atassi
- Succeeded by: Khalid al-Azm

Governor of Damascus
- In office 6 February 1936 – 2 March 1936
- Preceded by: Aref al-Khatib
- Succeeded by: Tawfiq al-Hayani

Personal details
- Born: 1895 Shheem, Beirut Vilayet, Ottoman Empire
- Died: 1981 (aged 85–86) Lebanon

Bahij al-Khatib (Arabic: بهيج الخطيب, romanized: Bahīj al-Khaṭīb; 1895–1981) was a French-appointed Syrian Head of State from July 8, 1939 to April 4, 1941.

== Early life ==
Bahji Al-Khatib was born in 1895 in Shheem, Chouf District his native village in present-day Lebanon, then part of the Ottoman Empire. He came from a well-off family engaged in agriculture and trade. He was educated at the School of Souk El-Gharb and the Syrian Protestant College, (modern-day American University of Beirut) and later worked in agriculture and the olive-oil trade. In 1918, he moved to Damascus at the age of 23, seeking employment in government institutions.

== Career ==
Al-Khatib was staunchly loyal to the continued French administration of Syria and opposed all aspirations for independence. He began his political career when he joined the civil service in Damascus after France imposed its League of Nations mandate over Syria and Lebanon in July 1920. Due to his loyalty to the French administration, he rose to be Director of Police and Public Security, and lead a campaign of intimidation and harassment of nationalist leaders and organizations. When the Nationalist Hashim al-Atassi, the first president of the newly declared Syrian Republic, resigned in protest over continued French prevarication against full independence, al-Khatib was appointed in his stead by the French authorities.

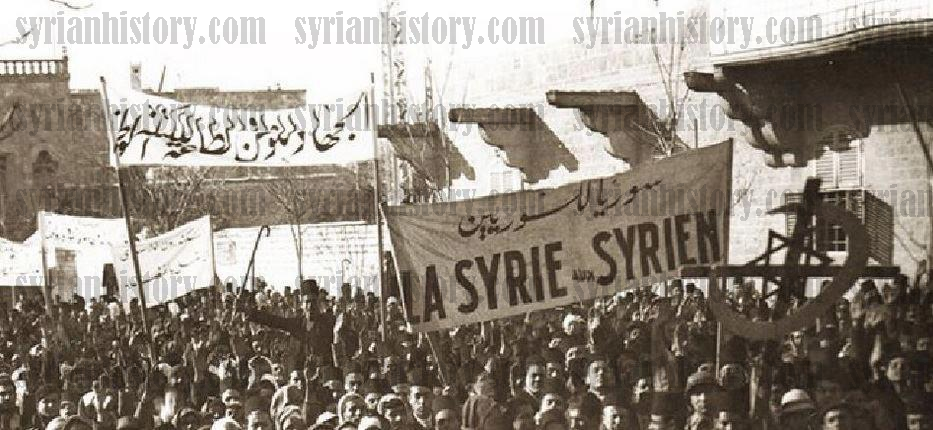
Syrian Demonstration against French Mandate in 1941, caused by economic hardships.

Al-Khatib remained in office after the fall of France in June 1940, serving under the Vichy French-controlled mandate administration. Facing mounting nationalist unrest, including protests in Damascus in early 1941, the French administration dismissed him on 4 April 1941 and appointed Khalid al-Azm as acting head of state in an effort to conciliate nationalist opinion.

Later on, Al-Khatib served as the Minister of Interior twice, and as the Governor of Damascus in 1943. He left Syria back to Lebanon after the Ba'ath Party took power in Syria. He died in 1981.
