= Maarouf al-Dawalibi =

Syrian politician

- معروف الدواليبي
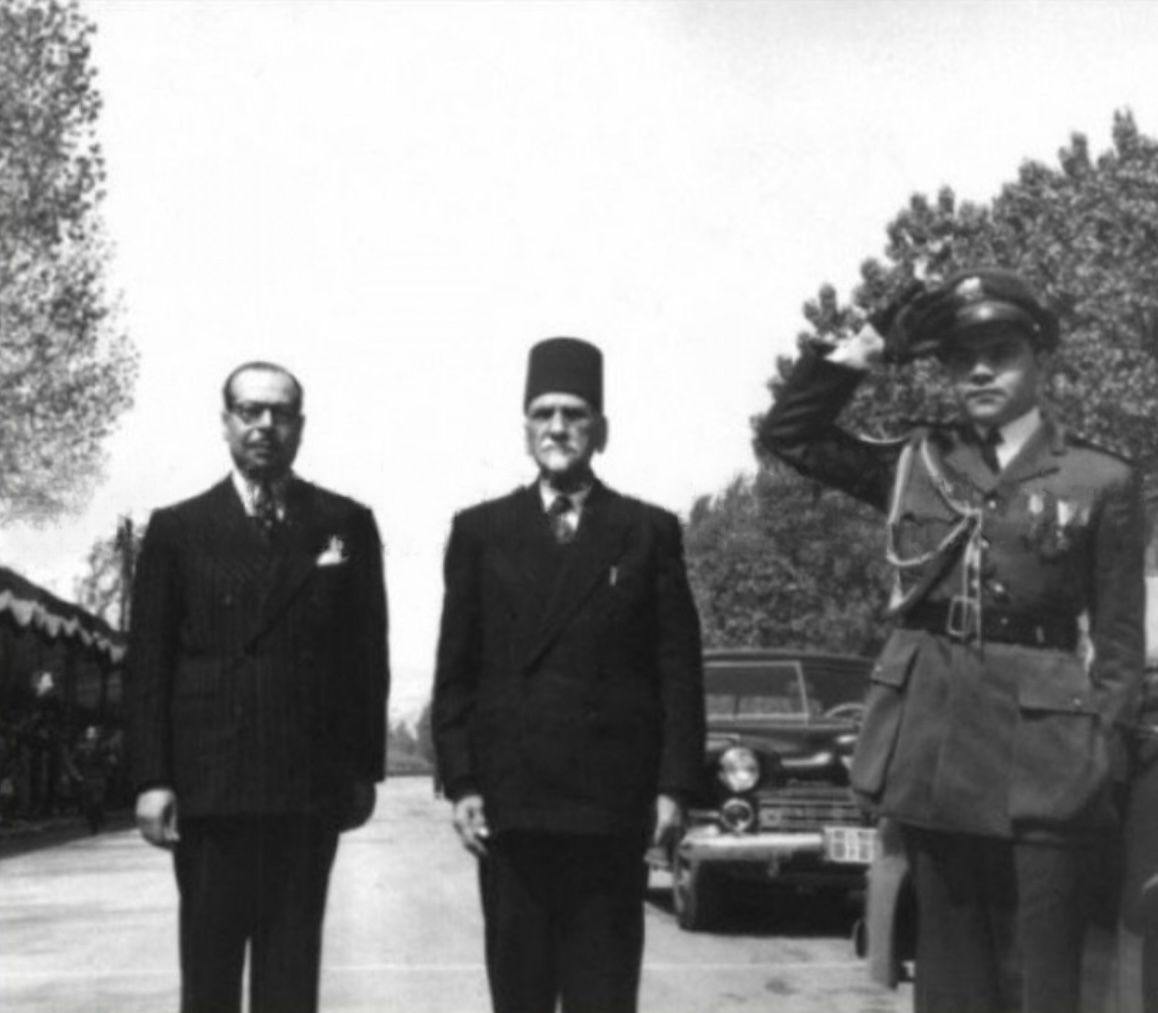
- 1951 photograph showing Maarouf al-Dawalibi, the Syrian Prime Minister, on the left, next to Hashim al-Atassi, the Syrian President.

21st Prime Minister of Syria
- In office 28 November 1951 – 29 November 1951
- President: Hashim al-Atassi
- Preceded by: Zaki al-Khatib
- Succeeded by: Fawzi al-Silu
- In office 22 December 1961 – 28 March 1962
- President: Nazim al-Qudsi
- Preceded by: Izzat al-Nuss
- Succeeded by: Bashir al-Azma

Speaker of the Parliament of Syria
- In office 23 June – 30 September 1951
- Preceded by: Nazim al-Kudsi
- Succeeded by: Rushdi al-Kikhya

Personal details
- Born: March 1909 Aleppo, Aleppo vilayet, Ottoman Empire
- Died: 15 January 2004 (aged 94) Riyadh, Saudi Arabia
- Party: People's Party and the Muslim Brotherhood
- Spouse: Umm Muhammad
- Children: 1
- Education: University of Damascus, Sorbonne University

Maarouf al-Dawalibi (Arabic: معروف الدواليبي, romanized: Maʿrūf al-Dawālībī; March 1909 – 15 January 2004), was a Syrian politician and was twice the prime minister of Syria. He was born in Aleppo, and held a Ph.D. in Law. He served as a minister of economy between 1949 and 1950, and was elected speaker of the parliament in 1951. He also served as minister of defense in 1954. After the Ba'ath party came to power in 1963, he was imprisoned and later exiled, serving as an adviser to several Saudi kings, including King Khalid. His son, Nofal al-Dawalibi, is involved in the Syrian Opposition.

== Biography ==
Maarouf al-Dawalibi was born in Aleppo. He received his early education in Aleppo and graduated from the University of Damascus with a B.A. in Law. He did his doctoral studies at the Sorbonne University on the Roman Law.

Al-Dawalibi became a professor at the University of Damacus and authored al-Huqūq al-Rūmāniyah, which was later published by the university. When the university set up Faculty of the Shariah, he was appointed to teach the principles of Fiqh. He authored Madkhal ilā ʻilm uṣūl al-fiqh, a book that is taught in the seminaries affiliated with the Nadwatul Ulama.

Al-Dawalibi was married to Umm Muhammad, a French woman who converted to Islam after marrying him.

=== First government (1951) ===
Al-Dawalibi emerged as head of government following a cabinet crisis in November 1951; this crisis was precipitated by the resignation of Prime Minister Hassan al-Hakim, which resulted in a power vacuum in Syria. President Hashim al-Atassi tasked Maarouf al-Dawalibi with forming a new government, and he took office as prime minister on 28 November.

In an effort to oppose military intervention in government, al-Dawalibi retained the defense portfolio for himself, declining to appoint Colonel Fawzi Selu to the post. The tradition of appointing Selu as Minister of Defense had been established following Adib Shishakli's December 1949 coup and had been enforced in subsequent governments. Al-Dawalibi's assumption of the Ministry of Defense was soon challenged by Colonel Selu, who took his complaint to Adib Shishakli. On the same day as the government was formed, a meeting was held between Shishakli, al-Dawalibi and President Hashum Atassi, in which Shishakli demanded the dissolution of the government and the formation of a new one, aligned with the army's interests. Al-Dawalibi and Atassi refused to comply with his demands.

The al-Dawalibi cabinet was short-lived; it lasted only 12 hours after its formation before being overthrown by a Shishakli's coup d'état on 29 November. The coup resulted in the arrests of Premier al-Dawalibi and all of his ministers, who were placed in Mezzeh prison. After failed attempts to secure his resignation, al-Dawalibi finally submitted it on 1 December. President Hashim al-Atassi then tasked Hamid al-Khouja, an independent politician, with forming a new cabinet. However, growing opposition prevented the cabinet's formation, prompting Atassi to submit his resignation on 2 December to avoid a political impasse.

On 3 December, Shishakli delegated the roles of prime minister and president to Fawzi Selu. In fact, Selu acted as a mere figurehead, while Shishakli established his military dictatorship. Al-Dawalibi was released from prison in 1952. He was subsequently subjected to a brief 1953 arrest due to his criticism of the government, after which he left the country and went into exile in Iraq. He returned to Syria after the 1954 coup d'état, which led to the overthrow of the Shishakli regime. The presidency was once again occupied by Hashim al-Atassi, who promised to complete his constitutional term. President Atassi resolved to restore the political normality that existed before the 1951 coup, and al-Dawalibi had to resubmit his resignation in accordance with constitutional procedures. Maarouf al-Dawalibi was incorporated as defense minister into Sabri al-Asali's cabinet, which lasted from 1 March to 19 June 1954. In this position, he fought to reduce the army's influence in the government and advocated for a law that prohibited military officers from participating in political parties.

=== Second government (1961–1962) ===
Following Syria's secession from its union with Egypt in 1961, President Nazim al-Qudsi tasked al-Dawalibi to form a government. Maarouf al-Dawalibi took office as prime minister on 22 December, with a cabinet comprising 16 ministers. Besides leading the cabinet, al-Dawalibi also held the position of Minister of Foreign Affairs.

In January 1962, Maarouf al-Dawalibi offered the mediation of the Syrian government in the Iraq–Kuwait dispute, which was sparked by Iraq's claim of sovereignty over the territory following Kuwait's independence in 1961. Iraqi President Abdul-Karim Qasim ignored the offer.

On 28 March 1962, a coup attempt led by Abdul Karim al-Nahlawi culminated in the arrest of Prime Minister Maarouf al-Dawalibi and President Nazim al-Qudsi. A few days later, on 1 April, a counter-coup by loyalist officers freed the two leaders and restored them to their positions, but al-Dawalibi was forced to submit his resignation to avoid further conflict with the military.

=== Exile and death ===
Al-Dawalibi's political career ended with the Ba'athist coup of 1963. The new Syrian authorities, composed of officers with Ba'athist and Nasserist ideologies, launched a campaign to arrest politicians linked to the anti-Nasser movement in Syria. The Revolutionary Command Council ordered the arrest of Maarouf al-Dawalibi and Nazim al-Kudsi for the "crime of secession." Al-Dawalibi remained imprisoned until 1964, when he went into exile. His first exile destination was Lebanon; after a brief stay in Beirut, he settled permanently in Saudi Arabia.

In 1965, he was appointed by King Faisal of Saudi Arabia to serve as a political advisor in the royal court. During the subsequent reigns of Kings Khalid and Fahd, al-Dawalibi continued his advisory role, retaining the position until his death. In the late 1970s, al-Dawalibi was sent to Pakistan at the request of dictator Zia-ul-Haq, to assist the Council of Islamic Ideology in drafting new Islamic legislation for the country. He initially wrote the laws in Arabic, which were subsequently translated into Urdu and English by a team of fifteen scholars. One of al-Dawalibi's contributions to Pakistan was the formulation of the 1979 Hudud Ordinances.

Maarouf al-Dawalibi died on 15 January 2004 in Riyadh. Since 2004, his remains have been buried in Al-Baqi Cemetery in Medina.

Preceded by Zaki al-Khatib	Prime Minister of Syria; 28–29 November 1951	Succeeded by Fawzi al-Silu
Preceded by Izzat al-Nuss	Prime Minister of Syria; 22 December 1961 – 28 March 1962	Succeeded by Bashir al-Azma
