= Nazim al-Qudsi =

President of Syria (1961–1963)

- ناظم القدسي
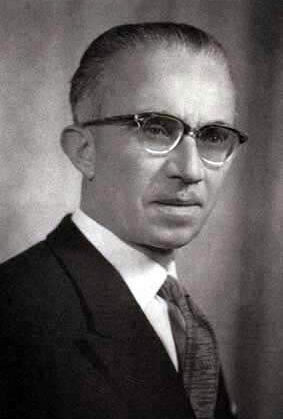

President of Syria
- In office 14 December 1961 – 8 March 1963
- Prime Minister: Izzat al-Nuss; Maarouf al-Dawalibi; Bashir al-Azma; Khalid al-Azm
- Preceded by: Gamal Abdel Nasser (United Arab Republic)
- Succeeded by: Lu'ay al-Atassi

Prime Minister of Syria
- In office 24 December 1949 – 27 December 1949
- Preceded by: Hashim al-Atassi
- Succeeded by: Khalid al-Azm
- In office 4 June 1950 – 27 March 1951
- Preceded by: Khalid al-Azm
- Succeeded by: Khalid al-Azm

1st Syrian Ambassador to the United States
- In office 19 March 1945 – 1947
- Succeeded by: Faris al-Khoury

Speaker of the Parliament of Syria
- In office 1 October 1951 – 2 December 1951
- Preceded by: Maarouf al-Dawalibi
- Succeeded by: Maamun al-Kuzbari
- In office 14 October 1954 – 1 October 1957
- Preceded by: Maamun al-Kuzbari
- Succeeded by: Akram al-Hawrani

Personal details
- Born: 14 February 1906 Aleppo, Aleppo Vilayet, Ottoman Empire
- Died: 6 February 1998 (aged 91) Amman, Jordan
- Party: National Bloc; People's Party

Nazim al-Qudsi (Arabic: ناظم القدسي, romanized: Nāẓim al-Qudsī or Nadhim Al-Kudisi; 14 February 1906 – 6 February 1998), was a Syrian politician who served as the president of Syria from 14 December 1961 to 8 March 1963. Qudsi was the last democratically elected President of Syria before the 1963 Syrian coup d'état.

== Early life and education ==
Al-Qudsi was born in Aleppo on 14 February 1906. After graduating from Aleppo College, he obtained his law degree from Damascus University. He later received a master's degree from the American University of Beirut (AUB), and PhD from the University of Geneva-affiliated Graduate Institute of International Studies.

== Early career ==
After his education, Qudsi returned to Syria in 1935 and joined the National Bloc, the leading anti-French independence movement, and became one of its prominent members in Aleppo. It was a political organization which sought to emancipate Syria from French control through diplomatic means rather than armed resistance. In 1936, he ran for parliament on a National Bloc ticket and won. He clashed with the Bloc leadership that failed to prevent the annexation of Alexandretta to Turkey in 1939. As a result, he resigned from the Bloc ranks. Qudsi created a coalition of Aleppine intellectuals around himself and Rushdi al-Kikhya, another lawyer who shared in his views, and the two men nominated themselves for Parliament in 1943, winning with ease. They lobbied against the election of Shukri al-Quwatli, a National Bloc leader, as president, but Quwatli was voted into office in August 1943. To appease the opposition, the new president appointed Qudsi as Syria's first Ambassador to the United States. Qudsi founded the Syrian Embassy in Washington, D.C. from scratch, and on 19 March 1945 presented his credentials to President Franklin D. Roosevelt. In 1947, he and Rushdi al-Kikhya founded the People's Party in Aleppo. It was inaugurated as an opposition movement to the Quwatli regime and created to counterbalance the political weight of the National Party, the successor to the National Bloc, loyal to Quwatli. The People's Party founders were mainly notables from Aleppo who aimed at creating union between Syria and Iraq, maintaining a democratic government, and advocating stronger ties with the West. The Hashemite royal family in Baghdad supported the party and funded many of its activities.

In 1947, Qudsi ran for Parliament on a party ticket and won. His election was repeated in 1949, 1954, and 1962. He voted against the re-election of Quwatli as president, but a parliamentary majority pushed through the election. On 29 March 1949, the Quwatli administration was toppled by a military coup d'état, launched by Chief of Staff Husni al-Za'im. Syria's new ruler asked Qudsi to form a government but he declined, claiming that the Za’im regime was unconstitutional and arguing that despite his faults, Quwatli was a constitutionally elected president while Za’im was an “illegal” one. As a result, Za’im had him arrested and the People's Party was shut down. He was released shortly afterwards and placed under house arrest in Aleppo. He became highly critical of Za’im when the latter closed Syria's border with Jordan and Iraq and threatened to go to war with both countries, accusing them of being agents of Great Britain in the Middle East. On 14 August 1949, he supported a coup that toppled and killed Za’im, launched by General Sami al-Hinnawi, an old friend of the People's Party and an ally of the Hashemite royals in Baghdad. Hinnawi created a political committee to run political affairs in the absence of an official government and appointed Qudsi to its top leadership. Qudsi also served on the Constitutional Assembly that drafted a new constitution for Syria and became Minister of Foreign Affairs in the first post-Za’im cabinet of Prime Minister Hashim al-Atassi (an ally of the People's Party as well as a founding member and former president of the National Bloc). His ally Kikhiya became Minister of Interior while other posts were distributed accordingly to members of the People's Party and independents who also opposed the old regime. Qudsi conducted talks with Crown Prince Abd al-Illah of Iraq for creating immediate union between Syria and Iraq and made numerous journeys to Baghdad for the purpose. He formulated an agreement that called for federal union, preserving independent governments in Damascus and Baghdad while coordinating military, economic, social, cultural, and political affairs between the two states. He then went to Cairo and proposed a similar program for all Arab states at the Arab League on 1 January 1951.

== Career before 1961 coup ==
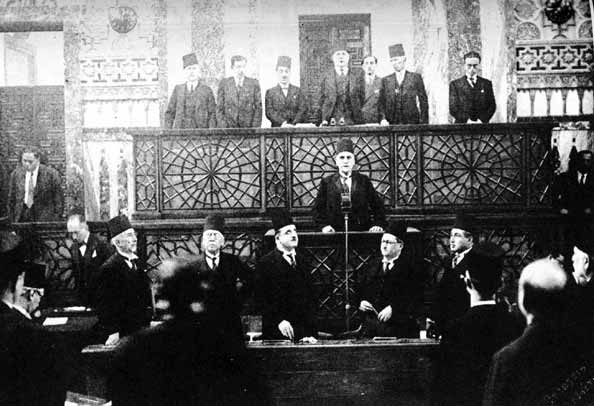
Nazim al-Qudsi (back row, far right) attending the inauguration of President Hashim al-Atassi in 1936.

To advance union talks, al-Atassi, who had recently been elected president of the republic, called on Qudsi to form a government on 24 December 1949. The latter complied, but military officers vetoed his cabinet and he resigned from office five days after coming to power. The officers argued that his government did not include an officer among its midst and that many of its members were declared opponents of officer meddling in political affairs. On 4 June 1950, Qudsi created a new government, less extremist than the first, and was able to secure its approval by appointing General Fawzi Selu as Minister of Defense. Selu was the right-hand-man of General Adib al-Shishakli, the military strongman of Syria. The cabinet lived for ten months, but was unable to take the union issue any further. Qudsi resigned on 27 March 1951. On 1 October 1951, he was elected Speaker of Parliament. Shortly afterwards, on 28 November, Adib al-Shishakli seized power in Damascus and arrested the entire People's Party leadership, accusing them of wanting to topple Syria's republican regime and replace it with a monarchical one that was loyal to Britain and Iraq. He appointed Selu as provisional head of state and arrested Qudsi, sending him to Mezzeh prison. He was released in January 1952 but placed under house arrest. He joined the underground and worked in secret against Shishakli, supporting a coup d'état that brought him down in February 1954.

In October 1954, Nazim al-Qudsi became a deputy in the first post-Shishakli Parliament and was elected speaker on 14 October 1954. He tried to regain some of his influence in political circles, but by that time, the People's Party had fallen from grace, and few Syrians advocated union with Iraq. Instead, they wanted union with Egypt, under the rising leadership of the young and charismatic President Gamal Abd al-Nasser. In vain, Qudsi tried challenging Nasser's authority. He advocated pro-British and pro-American views at a time when the majority of Syrians had become pro-Soviet Union. He called on Syria to join the Baghdad Pact, an Anglo-American treaty to contain Communism, and pro-Nasser newspapers accused him of working as an agent for the Hashemites. On 12 October 1957, Qudsi resigned from office and was replaced by the pro-Nasser socialist leader, Akram al-Hawrani. He voted against the Syrian-Egyptian union and when the two countries merged to form the United Arab Republic (UAR) in 1958, he resigned from public life altogether and retired to Aleppo.

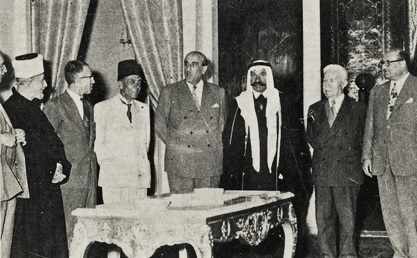
Syrian and Palestinian leaders meeting Syrian President Shukri al-Quwatli at the presidential palace, 1955. From right to left: Sabri al-Asali, Fares al-Khoury, Sultan Pasha al-Atrash, Quwatli, Mohamed Ali Eltaher, Nazim al-Qudsi, Amin al-Husayni and Muin al-Madi.

=== International relations after the UAR ===
On 28 September 1961, a new coup took place in Syria and toppled the UAR government. Qudsi rallied to its support and nominated himself for the first post-union Parliament, becoming a deputy for Aleppo in December 1961. He then ran for presidential office and won, becoming the first post-Nasser leader of Syria on 12 December 1961. As president, he worked to restore Syria's friendship with the anti-Nasser regimes in Jordan, Saudi Arabia, and Lebanon, and build bridges with the United States and Great Britain. The Hashemite family in Baghdad, which had supported his career for the past thirty years, had been toppled by a bloody military revolution in July 1958. He was never on good terms with the new leaders of Iraq, especially the revolt leader, General Abd al-Karim Qasim. The West, particularly President John F. Kennedy, welcomed Qudsi's ascent and labeled him a "friend" of the United States. To promote Syria's relations with Washington, Qudsi appointed Omar Abu-Riche, a renowned poet from Aleppo who like him, was an AUB graduate, as ambassador in the years 1961–1963. He began a massive economic reform program, restoring factories that had been nationalized by Nasser when he headed the UAR, and dismissing all pro-Nasser officials from office. All officers who were still loyal to the Egyptian President were discharged from the Syrian Army. Qudsi drafted a new constitution for Syria, restored the outlawed political parties, and received loans from the World Bank for rebuilding Syria's dislocated economy.

== Presidential term ==
President Qudsi clashed with the officers that had brought him to power and tried to marginalize their role in political affairs. He appointed Maarouf al-Dawalibi, a veteran of the People's Party with declared anti-officer views, as Prime Minister and Rashad Barmada from the same party as Minister of Defense. Bitter from his experience with the officers since the Shishakli era, Dawalibi began curbing their influence in all state affairs and centralizing matters in the hands of Qudsi and the government.

On 28 March 1962, a coup d'état took place in Syria, launched by Colonel Abd al-Karim al-Nahlawi. He arrested Qudsi and Dawalibi, accusing them of misusing their powers and persecuting the officers of the Syrian Army. A counter coup broke out on 2 April, headed by Chief of Staff Abd al-Karim Zahr al-Din, who ordered all troops to stand by President Qudsi. The army complied, releasing Qudsi from prison and restoring the dissolved Parliament. Qudsi refused to arrest or kill Nehlawi, but rather, curbed his power by appointing him military attaché to Indonesia—a purely ceremonial post. He then tried to appease the officers and the socialists by calling on Bashir al-Azma, a doctor who had been close to Nasser and who held office as Minister of Health under the UAR, to become Prime Minister in April 1962 and Rashad Barmada (Qudsi's long time friend) became the Deputy Prime minister. His cabinet included members of the socialist Ba'ath Party that was pro-Nasser. Qudsi and Azma dispatched Foreign Minister Adnan al-Azhari to Cairo to mend relations with the Egyptian President. When that failed, however, they filed a complaint to the Arab League, accusing him of wanting to destabilize Syria through interfering in its domestic affairs and calling on the army to rebel against the government.

On 8 March 1963, another coup d'état took place in Syria, launched by the Military Committee of the Ba'ath Party. The officers who came to power pledged to restore the UAR and had Qudsi arrested. He was released after a while. He moved to Lebanon, Europe, and finally to Jordan where he lived in exile. He died on February 6, 1998, a week before his 92nd birthday.
