= Syrian Constitution of 1953 =

Constitution of the Syrian Republic

Overview
- Original title: دستور الجمهورية السورية
- Jurisdiction: Second Syrian Republic
- Date effective: 15 July 1953
- System: Unitary presidential republic

Government structure
- Branches: Three (executive, legislative and judiciary)
- Head of state: President
- Chambers: Unicameral (Chamber of Deputies)
- Executive: President-led Council of Ministers responsible to the Chamber of Deputies; President as head of government
- Judiciary: The Supreme Court, the Court of Cassation and other courts
- Federalism: Unitary
- First legislature: October 24, 1953
- Repealed: 26 February 1954
- Supersedes: Constitution of 1950
- Superseded by: Constitution of 1950

Full text
- Constitution of Syria (1953) at Wikisource
- دستور الجمهورية السورية at Arabic Wikisource

The Syrian Constitution of July 10, 1953 was promulgated following a constitutional referendum under Adib al-Shishakli to replace the Syrian Constitution of September 5, 1950. This latter was later reinstated when Hashim al-Atassi returned to the presidency in 1954. The Constitution of July 10, 1953 is considered "the one under which the presidential system of government was introduced for the first time in an Arab country."

== History ==
The draft constitution, developed by the Council of Ministers, was made public on June 21, 1953. On the same day, Decree No. 151 was issued, announcing that the Syrian people, both men and women, would vote on this draft constitution by plebiscite on July 10, 1953. They would also directly and secretly elect the President of the Republic.

The constitution was adopted following a referendum under Adib al-Shishakli, replacing the 1950 constitution. Al-Shishakli was the only presidential candidate, and the constitution was approved by 99.9% of voters. It introduced Syria's first presidential system, similar to the United States, abolishing the prime minister's position and making ministers accountable to the president rather than the parliament. Civil rights, political and economic pluralism, and Syria's Arab identity from the 1950 constitution were preserved.

The constitution lasted only six months, from July 10, 1953, to February 26, 1954. It granted the president direct election by the people, making him the head of government with power to appoint ministers. In return, the constitution protected the legislative body from dissolution and balanced the executive-legislative powers. Though regarded as a solution to Syria's political instability, it was difficult for political forces to accept due to its implementation under a dictatorial regime. Following al-Shishakli's removal in February 1954, the 1950 constitution and parliament were reinstated, with Hashim al-Atassi returning as president.

== Sources ==
- Caldwell, J.A.M.; et al. (1966). Dustur: aperçu sur les constitutions des états arabes et islamiques (in French). Brill Archive.
- Galal, Ezz el Din (1963). Le système unicaméral: son application en Égypte, en Syrie et dans la République arabe unie (in French). Librairie Droz.
- Haddad, Ghassan Mohammed Rashad (2007). The Political History of Syria: The Making of the Syrian Constitution (in Arabic). Beirut: Dar Al-Nahar.
- Torrey, Gordon (1964). The Syrian Constitution of 1950: A Study in Constitutional Development. Oxford University Press.
- Vernier, Bernard (1964). "Le rôle politique de l'armée de Syrie". Politique étrangère (in French). 29 (5): 458–517. doi:10.3406/polit.1964.2260.
