= 1953 Syrian presidential election =

- 10 July 1953
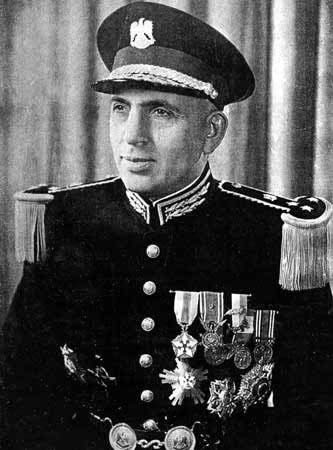
Nominee	Adib Shishakli
Party	Arab Liberation Movement
Popular vote	861,910
Percentage	99,77%
- Shishakli: 95–100%
President before election
Fawzi Selu
Elected President
Adib Shishakli
Arab Liberation Movement

Presidential elections were held in Syria on 10 July 1953. There was only one candidate, Adib Shishakli. According to the official results, of the 864,425 voters who cast votes, 861,910 voted for Shishakli while 2,515 cast invalid votes. The election took place on the same day as the 1953 Syrian constitutional referendum.

== Results ==
Candidate	Votes	%
Adib Shishakli	861,910	100.00
Total	861,910	100.00
Valid votes	861,910	99.71
Invalid/blank votes	2,515	0.29
Total votes	864,425	100.00
Registered voters/turnout	995,417	86.84
Source: Ezz el Din Galal
