= 1953 Syrian constitutional referendum =

- 10 July 1953

Results
| Choice | Votes | % |
|---|---|---|
| Yes | 861,152 | 99.69% |
| No | 2,713 | 0.31% |
| Valid votes | 863,865 | 99.94% |
| Invalid or blank votes | 560 | 0.06% |
| Total votes | 864,425 | 100.00% |

A constitutional referendum was held in Syria on 10 July 1953. The changes to the constitution were approved by 99.7% of voters, with turnout reported to be 86.8%.

== Results ==
| Choice | Votes | % |
|---|---|---|
| For | 861,152 | 99.7 |
| Against | 2,713 | 0.3 |
| Invalid/blank votes | 560 | – |
| Total | 864,425 | 100 |
Source: Nohlen et al.
