= Fawzi Selu =

Syrian military leader and politician

- فوزي سلو
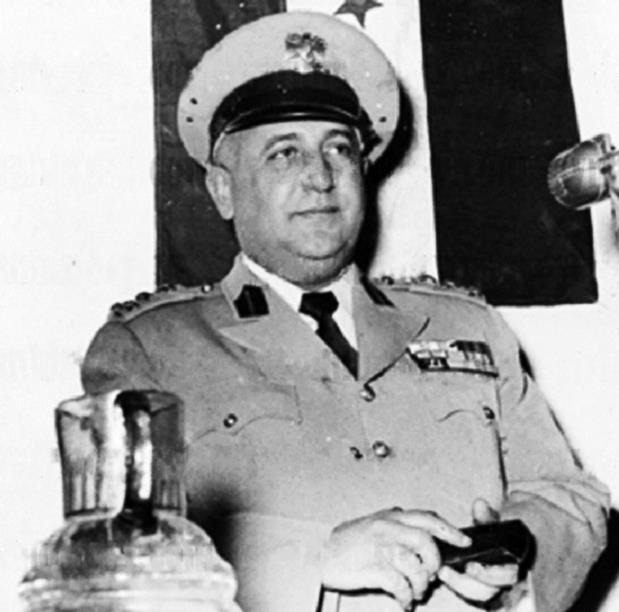

President of Syria (military rule)
- In office December 3, 1951 – July 11, 1953
- Prime Minister: Himself
- Leader: Adib Shishakli
- Preceded by: Hashim al-Atassi; Adib Shishakli (acting)
- Succeeded by: Adib Shishakli (Military Rule)

Prime Minister of Syria
- In office December 3, 1951 – July 19, 1953
- President: Himself; Adib Shishakli (military rule)
- Leader: Adib Shishakli
- Preceded by: Maaruf al-Dawalibi
- Succeeded by: Adib Shishakli

Head of the Army Command Council
- In office November 29, 1953 – July 11, 1954
- Preceded by: Office established
- Succeeded by: Office abolished

Defense Minister
- In office 2 December 2, 1951–July 19, 1953; Preceded by Maarouf al-Dawalibi; Succeeded by Raf'at Khankan
- In office June 4, 1950 – November 13, 1951
- Preceded by: Akram al-Hourani
- Succeeded by: Zaki al-Khatib

Chief of the General Staff
- In office April 23, 1951 – 1953
- Preceded by: Anwar Bannud
- Succeeded by: Shawkat Shuqayr

Personal details
- Born: 1905 Damascus, Syria Vilayet, Ottoman Syria, Ottoman Empire
- Died: April 29, 1972 (aged 67) Harasta, Syrian Arab Republic
- Party: Independent politician Arab Liberation Movement (affiliated, due close relation with Shishakli)

Fawzi Selu (1905–April 29, 1972) (Arabic: فوزي السلو, romanized: Fawzī al-Salū) was a Syrian military leader, politician and the President of Syria from December 3, 1951, to July 11, 1953.

== Career ==
He studied at the Homs Military Academy and joined the French-sponsored Troupe Speciales that was created when France imposed its League of Nations mandate on Syria in July 1920. He had a successful military career, and when Syria became fully independent in 1946, he became the director of the academy. He was given a command in the 1948 Arab-Israeli War where he became close to chief of staff Husni al-Za'im. When Za'im came to power in a coup in March 1949, he appointed Selu military attaché to the Syrian-Israeli armistice talks, and he became the principal architect of the cease-fire that was signed in July of that year. Selu, supported by Za'im, demonstrated a willingness to pursue a comprehensive peace settlement with Israel, including a final border agreement, Palestinian refugees, and the establishment of a Syrian embassy in Tel Aviv. However Za'im was overthrown and killed, and civilian rule was restored with the administration of the nationalist Hashim al-Atassi. Atassi upheld the armistice agreement, but refused to consider peace with Israel. Selu then allied himself with military strongman general Adib al-Shishakli, who contrived to have Selu appointed minister of defense in three cabinets under president Atassi. Shishakli finally launched a coup in November 1951, but could not persuade the popular Atassi to stay on as president, who resigned in protest. As a result, Shishakli appointed Selu as president, prime minister and chief of staff, while retaining real power for himself with the less public role of deputy chief of staff. The two men ran a police state and suppressed virtually all opposition. Under the direction of Shishakli, Selu improved relations with Jordan, opening the first Syrian embassy in Amman and befriending King Talal. He also sought better relations with Lebanon, Egypt and Saudi Arabia.

On July 11, 1953, Shishakli finally dispensed Selu and appointed himself as president. When Shishakli was overthrown in February 1954, a military court in Damascus charged Selu with corruption, misuse of office, and unlawful amendment of the constitution. Selu fled to Saudi Arabia and became an advisor to King Saud and then his brother King Faisal. He was sentenced to death in absentia. After the overthrowing of the government that sentenced him to death, he was later pardoned by the new government and returned to Damascus. Retiring from politics, he later died in the Harasta Military Hospital at the age of 67 years old, on April 29, 1972.

Preceded by Hashim al-Atassi	President of Syria; 1951–1953 (military rule)	Succeeded by Adib al-Shishakli (military rule)
