= Rushdi al-Kikhya =

Syrian politician

- رشدي الكيخيا
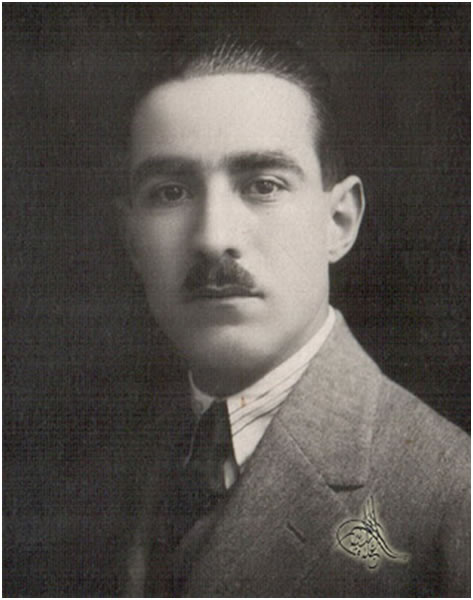
- Rushdi al-Kikhya in 1932

Speaker of the Parliament of Syria
- In office December 12, 1949 – June 23, 1951

Minister of Interior
- In office August 14, 1949 – December 12, 1949

Personal details
- Born: 1899 Aleppo, Syria
- Died: 14 March 1987 (aged 87–88) Nicosia, Cyprus
- Party: People's Party, National Bloc
- Education: Sorbonne University
- Occupation: Politician

Rushdi al-Kikhya (Arabic: رشدي الكيخيا; 1899 – 14 March 1987) was a Syrian political leader who founded the People's party in 1948. Kikhya was elected as a Speaker of the Parliament of Syria between 1949 and 1951, and he was elected five terms as a member of the Syrian Parliament (MP) (1936, 1943, 1947, 1949 and 1954). Kikhiya also served as minister of interior in 1949.

== Career ==
Rushdi al-Kikhya was born and raised in Aleppo. His grandfather, Ahmed, was a member in the Chamber of Deputies. He was educated at the Islamic College in Beirut, followed by studying law at the Sorbonne in Paris, before his return to Syria in 1922.

He later became a member in the National Bloc, and was elected to the Syrian Parliament in 1936. In 1939, Kikhya clashed with the Bloc leadership, however, over their failure to prevent Turkey's annexation of the Sanjak of Alexandretta.

Kikhya joined Nazem al-Qudsi, also from Aleppo, and campaigned against the election of Shukri al-Quwatli, the National Bloc candidate for the presidency in 1943. In 1948, Kikhiya founded the People's party with Nazem al-Qudsi and Mustafa Bey Barmada.

Kikhya supported the coup that ousted Husni al-Za'im in August 1949 and allied himself with Syria's new leader, President Hashim al-Atasi. Kikhya became minister of interior in a cabinet headed by Atasi himself that lasted from August to December 1949. Kikhya then became chairman of the Constitutional Assembly that drafted a new constitution for Syria. In September, he became a deputy for Aleppo and was elected speaker of the parliament.

The leadership of the People's Party including Kikhya pushed to form a union with Iraq, to curb any future Israeli eastward expansion. However, Kikhya withdrew from the political life upon the formation of the United Arab Republic in 1958.

He died on 14 March 1987 in Nicosia, Cyprus, and was buried there.
