= Munir al-Ajlani =

Syrian politician (d. 2004)

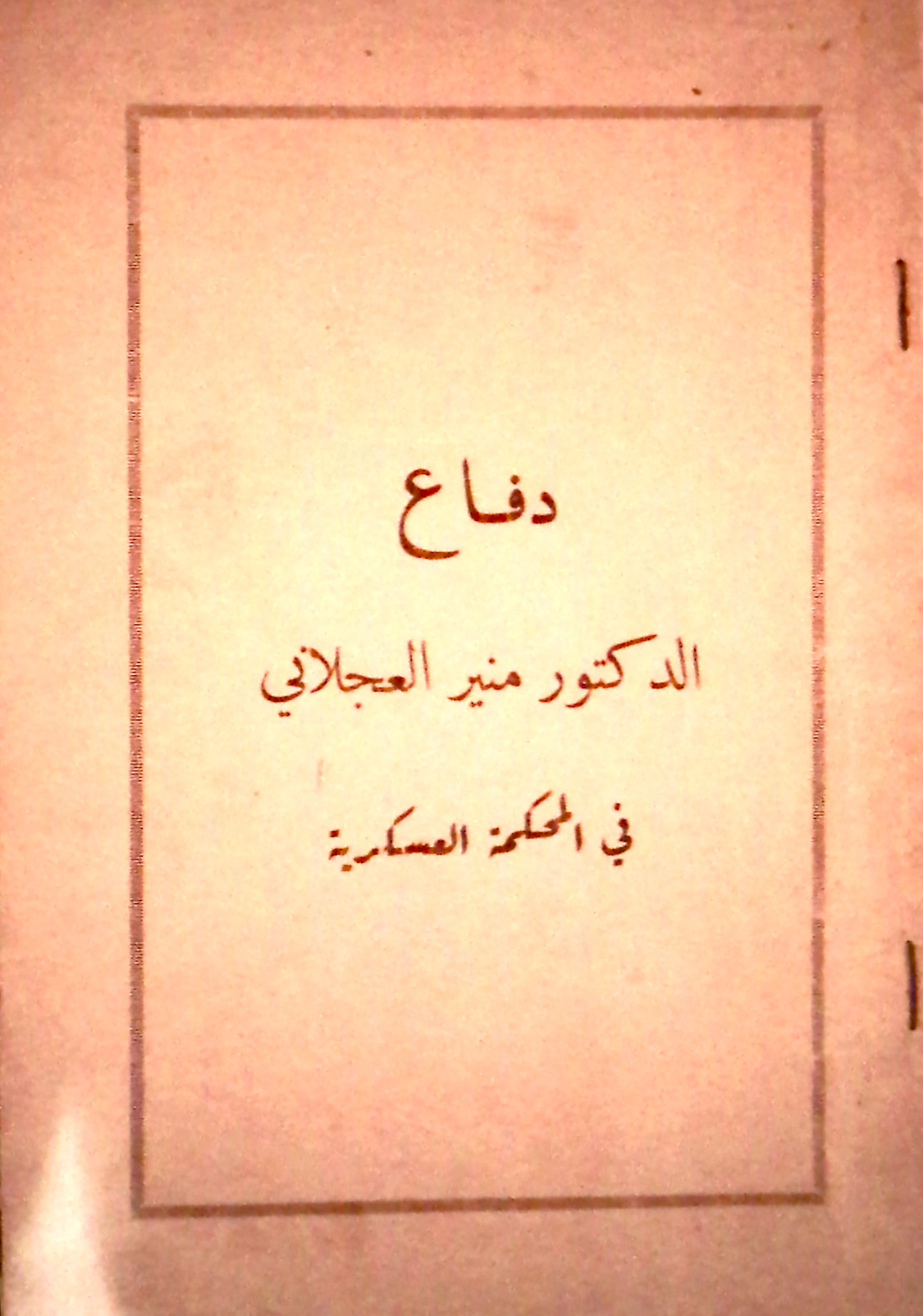
Munir al-Ajlani

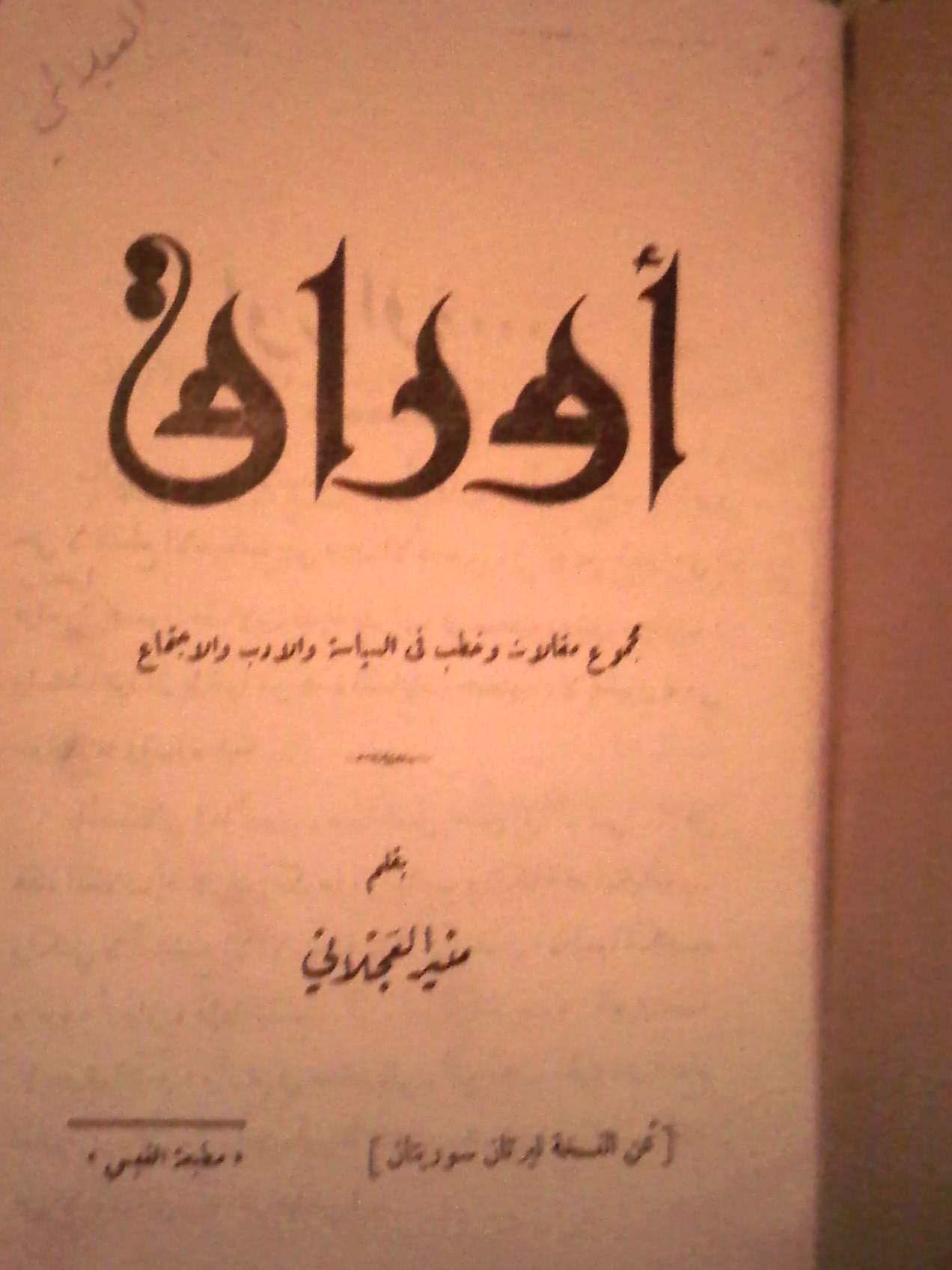
Munir al-Ajlani

Munir al-Ajlani (Dr. Munir Ajlani, منير محمد علي العجلاني) (August 1912 or 1914 – 20 June 2004) was a Syrian politician, writer, lawyer, and scholar. He made history as the youngest Syrian minister. He received his doctorate at a very young age from La Sorbonne University in Paris.

== Family history and controversy ==
Some sources say that Ajlani was born in 1904. It is believed that al-Ajlani changed his date of birth on official records to be considered for parliament at an early age.

He married Inam al-Hasani, daughter of president Taj al-Din al-Hasani, in 1943. They had five children: Manar al-Ajlani, Fawaz al-Ajlani, Amir al-Ajlani, Nawara al-Ajlani, and Munira al-Ajlani.

The Ajlani family's origin goes back to the Ashraf of Saudi Arabia. Their descendants travelled and settled in Damascus at the time when Damascus was a center for knowledge. Dr Munir Al-Ajlani was born into a family of academic and material wealth. The Ajlani family became one of the most well-known and wealthiest families in Syria.

== Education ==
Ajlani, born into an upper-class family that owned much land, followed in his family's footsteps. He studied at the University of Damascus then continued his studies in Paris where he earned his Phd from La Sorbonne University. Ajlani studied law and obtained a minor degree in literature and linguistics.

== Bibliography ==
- آوراق (Papers)
- عبقرية الاسلام في آصول الحكم (The Genius of Islam in Governing)
- الحقوق الرومانية، الدستورية
- آزهار الألم (Poetry Book Flowers of Pain)
- رجل في جلد آخر (A Man in Another Man's Skin)
- عجائب الدنيا السبع (The Seven Wonders of the World)
- فيصل
- La constitution de la Syrie
- معاوية، عائشة، زنوبية
- Prelude to Nizar Qabbani's first set of poems in 1944 entitled: "The Brunette Said to Me"
