= 1954 Syrian coup d'état =

Coup in Syria that Overthrew Adib Shishakli

- Part of the Arab Cold War
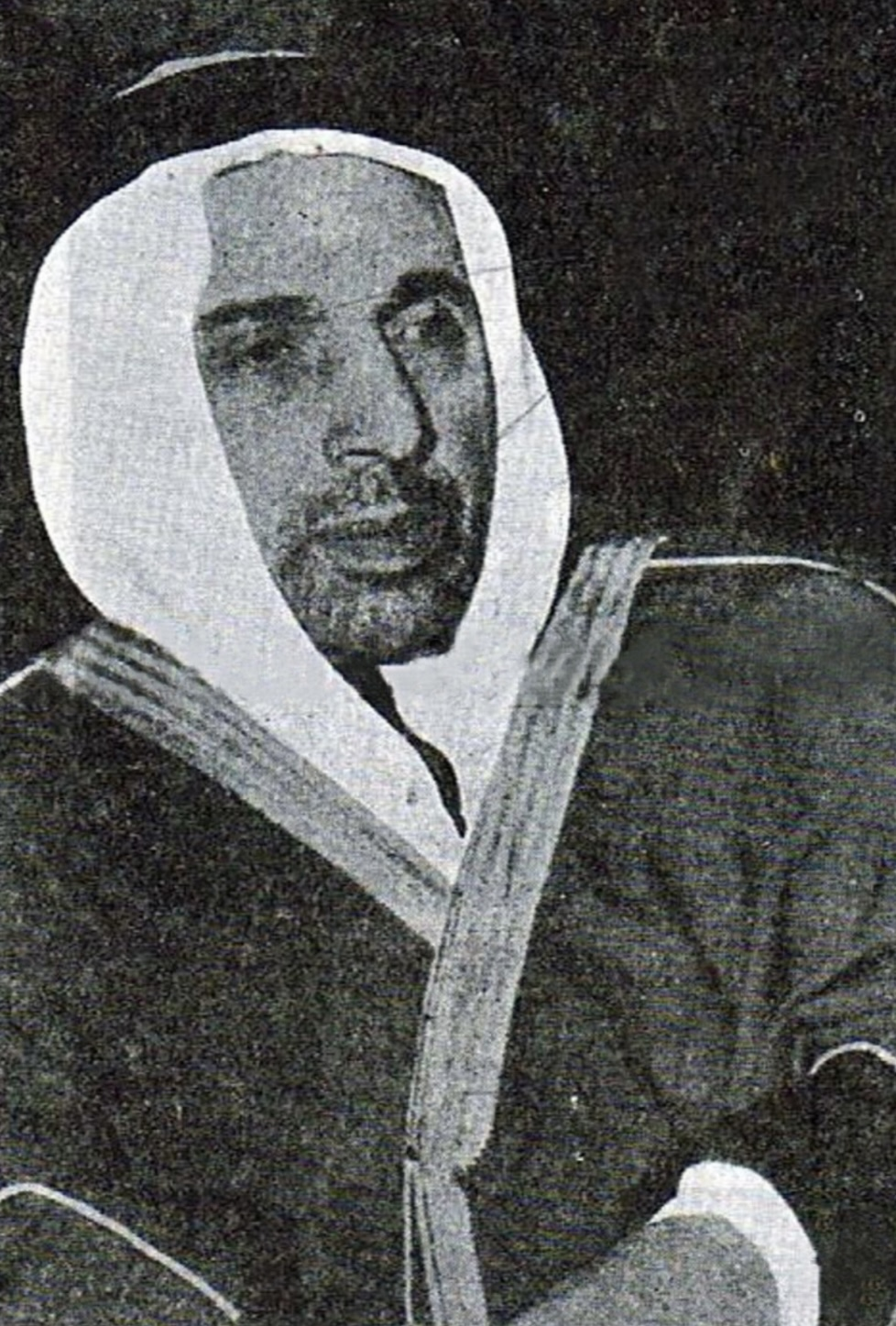
- Shishakli in exile soon after overthrowing, Saudi Arabia.
Date	25–26 February 1954
Location	Syria
Result	Overthrow of Adib Shishakli

Belligerents
(Syria) Syrian Government: Arab Liberation Movement; (Syria) Syrian Armed Forces loyalists	(Syria) Syrian Armed Forces coup plotters National Party; People's Party; Muslim Brotherhood; Communist Party; Ba'ath Party

Commanders and leaders
Adib Shishakli (President and Prime Minister of Syria); Salah Shishakli (army field commander); Rasmi Qudsi (army field commander); Abdul-Haq Shihada (gendarmerie commandant); Husain Hidda (army field commander); Omar Thamer (Aleppo garrison commandant)	Hashim al-Atassi; Sultan al-Atrash; Shaukat Shuqair (army commander); Mustafa Hamdoun (Aleppo rebel commandant); Abdul-Jawad Raslan (Ladkia garrison commandant); Faisal Atassi (Aleppo rebel officer)

The 1954 Syrian coup d'état took place in February of that year to overthrow the government of Adib Shishakli. Leading the anti-Shishakli movement were former President Atassi and the veteran Druze leader Sultan al-Atrash.

== Background ==
Colonel Adib Shishakli came to power by a coup in December 1949, forming a military autocracy. As the leader of Syria, Adib Shishakli recognized the desires of Syria's Arab majority, and accordingly adopted a policy of pan-Arabism. He clashed frequently with the independent-minded Druze minority on the Jabal Druze mountain, accusing them of wanting to topple his government using funds from Jordan, and in 1954 resorted to shelling Druze strongholds to put down resistance to his rule.

== Overthrow of Shishakli ==
Growing discontent eventually led to a coup, in which Shishakli was overthrown in February 1954. The plotters included members of the Syrian Communist Party, Druze officers, Ba'ath Party members, and possibly had Iraqi backing. He had also arrested many active officers in the Syrian Army, including the rising young Adnan al-Malki, also a prominent Baathist. Leading the anti-Shishakli movement were former President Atassi and the veteran Druze leader Sultan al-Atrash. The largest anti-Shishakli conference had been held in Atassi's home in Homs. Shishakli had responded by arresting Atassi and Atrash's sons, Adnan and Mansur (both of whom were ranking politicians in Syria).

When the insurgency reached its peak, Shishakli backed down, refusing to drag Syria into civil war. He fled to Lebanon, but when the Druze leader Kamal Jumblat threatened to have him killed, he fled to Brazil.

== Aftermath ==
After the overthrow of President Shishakli in 1954 coup, he continued political maneuvering supported by competing factions in the military eventually brought Arab nationalist and socialist elements to power. The early years of independence were marked by political instability. Prior to the union between Syria and Egypt in 1958, Shishakli toyed with the idea of returning to Syria to launch a coup d'état, using funds provided by Iraq. The coup was foiled by Syrian intelligence and Shishakli was sentenced to death in absentia.

== See also ==
- March 1949 Syrian coup d'état
- 1963 Syrian coup d'état
- 1966 Syrian coup d'état
- List of modern conflicts in the Middle East
