= Zaki al-Khatib =

Syrian politician

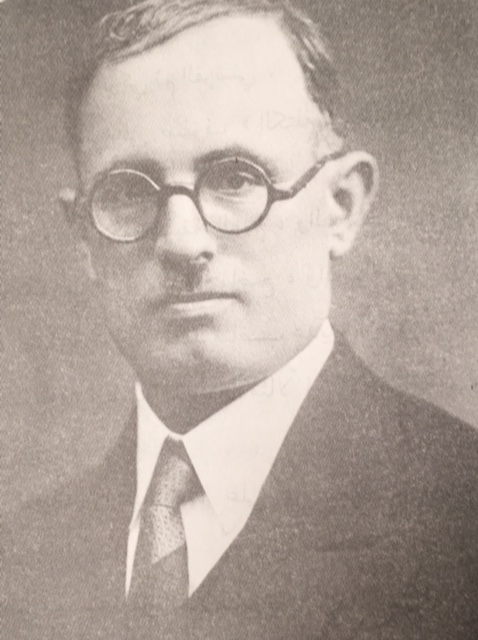
Zaki Al-Khatib.

Zaki al-Khatib (1887–1961) was a Syrian politician from the People's Party who served as Prime Minister of Syria.

== Political career ==
He was Minister of Justice from September 1941 to April 1942.
