= Hashim al-Atassi =

Syrian statesman, thrice president (1875–1960)

- هاشم الأتاسي
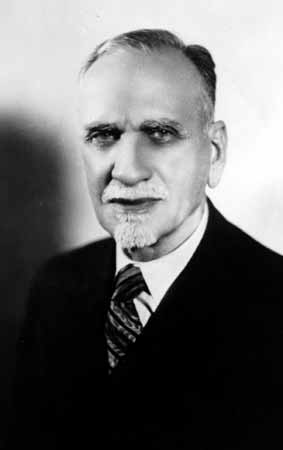

President of Syria
- In office 21 December 1936 – 7 July 1939
- Prime Minister: Jamil Mardam Bey; Lutfi al-Haffar; Nasuhi al-Bukhari
- Preceded by: Muhammad 'Ali Bay al-'Abid
- Succeeded by: Bahij al-Khatib
- In office 19 December 1949 – 2 December 1951
- Prime Minister: Nazim al-Qudsi; Khalid al-Azm; Hassan al-Hakim; Zaki al-Khatib; Maarouf al-Dawalibi
- Preceded by: Sami al-Hinnawi (military rule)
- Succeeded by: Adib Shishakli (military rule)
- In office 28 February 1954 – 6 September 1955
- Prime Minister: Sabri al-Asali; Said al-Ghazzi; Fares al-Khoury; Sabri al-Asali
- Preceded by: Maamun al-Kuzbari (acting)
- Succeeded by: Shukri al-Quwatli

Prime Minister of Syria
- In office 3 May 1920 – 26 July 1920
- Monarch: Faisal I
- Preceded by: Rida Pasha al-Rikabi
- Succeeded by: Aladdin Al-Droubi
- In office 17 August 1949 – 24 December 1949
- Preceded by: Muhsin al-Barazi
- Succeeded by: Nazim al-Kudsi

President of the Constituent Assembly
- In office 11 August 1928 – 6 September 1928
- Preceded by: Badi' Muwayyad
- Succeeded by: Faris al-Khoury

Speaker of the Syrian National Congress
- In office 11 December 1919 – 17 July 1920
- Preceded by: Office established
- Succeeded by: Badi' Muwayyad

Personal details
- Born: 11 January 1875 Homs, Syria Vilayet, Ottoman Empire
- Died: 5 December 1960 (aged 85) Homs, Syria, United Arab Republic
- Party: National Bloc (1928–1947); People's Party (1948–1960)
- Parent: Khaled al-Atassi

Hashim al-Atassi (Arabic: هاشم الأتاسي, romanized: Hāšim al-ʾAtāsī; 11 January 1875 – 5 December 1960) was a Syrian politician and statesman who served as the President of Syria on three occasions from 1936 to 1939, 1949 to 1951 and 1954 to 1955.

== Early life ==
He was born in Homs in 1875 to the large, landowning and politically active Atassi family. He studied public administration at the Mekteb-i Mülkiye in Istanbul, and graduated in 1893. He began his political career in 1888 in the Ottoman vilayet of Beirut, and through the years, up to 1918, served as Governor of Homs, Hama, Baalbek, Anatolia, and Jaffa, which included the then-small suburb of Tel Aviv. In 1919, after the defeat of Ottoman Turkey during World War I, he was elected chairman of the Syrian National Congress, the equivalent of a modern parliament.

On 8 March 1920 that body declared independence as a constitutional monarchy, under King Faisal I. He became prime minister during this short-lived period, for French occupation soon followed under the terms of the Sykes-Picot Agreement and a League of Nations Mandate (Also see: San Remo conference). During his tenure, Atassi appointed the veteran independence activist and statesman Abd al-Rahman Shahbandar, one of the leaders of the Syrian nationalist movement against the Ottoman Empire during World War I, as Foreign Minister. He delegated Shahbandar to formulate alliances between Syria and Europe, in a vain attempt to prevent the implementation of a French Mandate. France moved quickly to reverse Syrian independence.

The French High Commissioner Henri Gouraud presented Faisal with an ultimatum, demanding the surrender of Aleppo to the French Army, the dismantling of the Syrian Army, the adaptation of the French franc in Syria, and the dissolution of the Atassi government. Shahbandar's efforts to compromise with Gouraud proved futile, and Atassi's cabinet was dissolved on 24 July 1920, when the French defeated the Syrian Army at the Battle of Maysalun and imposed their mandate over Syria.

== Career ==
=== Syria under French occupation ===
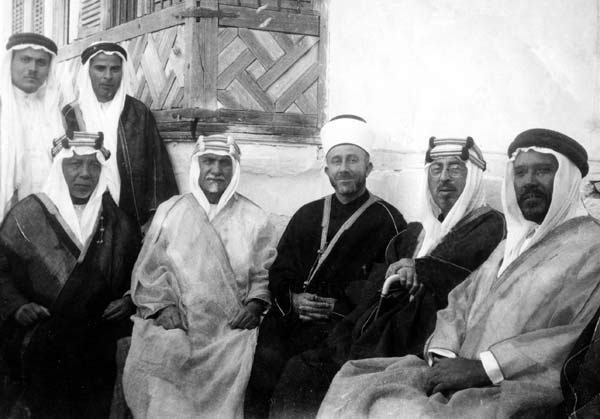
Al-Atassi (second person seated from the left) in a visit to Saudi Arabia in the early 1930s wearing a Bedouin garb. To his left are Mohammad Amin al-Husayni, the Grand Mufti of Jerusalem and Emir Shakib Arslan, an Arab nationalist philosopher from Lebanon

After the fall of the Arab Kingdom of Syria following French victory in the Franco-Syrian War, Atassi met with a group of notables in October 1927 and founded the National Bloc, which was to lead the Syrian nationalist movement in Syria for the next twenty years. The Bloc was a political coalition movement that sought full independence for Syria through diplomatic rather than violent resistance. It founders were a group of landowners, lawyers, civil servants, and Ottoman-trained professionals from Damascus, Aleppo, Homs, Hama, and Lattakia. Atassi was elected permanent President of the National Bloc.

In 1928, he was also elected President of the Constituent Assembly, and charged with laying out Syria's first republican constitution. The assembly was dissolved by the French high commissioner in May 1930 because of its adherence to the 1920 proclamation, and Atassi was imprisoned by the French for several months at Arwad Island. After being freed, he renominated himself for the presidency but lost the first round of elections and dropped out of the second, giving his endorsement to the independent Mohammad Ali al-Abid, who became president in the summer of 1932. In 1928 and 1932, he became a deputy for Homs in Parliament.

=== First term as President of Syria ===
Atassi initially supported the Abid government but became disenchanted from the new president when Abid appointed two pro-French politicians, being Haqqi al-Azm as Prime Minister and Subhi Barakat as Speaker of Parliament. In 1934, Abid negotiated a treaty with France that promised gradual independence from the mandate but kept the Syrian Mountains under French control. Atassi severely criticized the treaty, arguing that no independence was valid unless it encompassed all of Syria's territory. He called for a 60-day strike to protest Abid's proposed treaty. The Bloc mobilized massive street-wide support for Atassi's call, and most shops and enterprises closed down and riots raged daily, crippling the economy and embarrassing Abid before the international community.

In defeat, the French government agreed to recognize the National Bloc leaders as the sole representatives of the Syrian people and invited Hashem al-Atassi for diplomatic talks in Paris. On 22 March 1936, he headed a senior Bloc delegation to France, and, over 6 months, managed to formulate a Franco-Syrian treaty of independence. Atassi's treaty guaranteed emancipation over 25 years, with full incorporation of previously autonomous territories into Greater Syria.

In return, Syria pledged to support France in times of war, offer the use of her air space, and the right for France to maintain military bases on Syrian territory. Other political, cultural, and economic attachments were made and Atassi returned to Syria in triumph on 27 September 1936. Hailed as a national hero, he was elected President of the Republic by a majority vote in November 1936, the first head of state of the modern state of Syria.

=== World War II ===
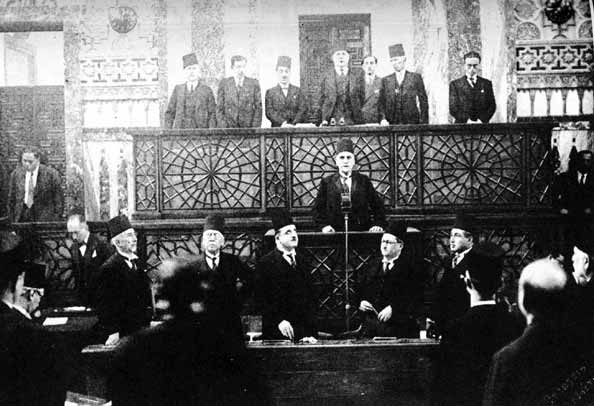
The presidential inauguration of Hashem al-Atassi, seen here delivering his speech, in Parliament on 21 December 1936.

However, by the end of 1938 it became clear that the French government had no intention of ratifying the treaty, partly due to fears that if it relinquished its colonies in the Middle East, it would be outflanked in a war with Nazi Germany that was brewing in Europe. Atassi resigned on 7 July 1939 as the French continued to procrastinate about full Syrian independence and the withdrawal of French troops, and public discontent at the delay boiled over onto the streets. Abd al-Rahman Shahbandar returned to Syria at this time and agitated against Atassi and the National Block for failing to secure French ratification.

Atassi's resignation was also influenced by the French decision to cede the Syrian province of Alexandretta (current day Iskenderun in Hatay Province) to Turkey, enraging Syrian nationalists. The ex-President retired to his native Homs and spent one year in seclusion, refusing to take part in political activity. Following his resignation, several years of instability and French military rule followed. The 1940s overall were dominated by the politics and machinations of World War II and its aftermath. Syria was occupied by British and General Charles de Gaulle's Free French Forces, which did not leave until 1946.

In an attempt at appeasing the Syrians, de Gaulle promised independence and visited Syria to elicit support for France. He visited Hashem al-Atassi in Homs and invited him to resume the presidency, assuring the veteran leader that France wanted to turn a new page in her relations with Syria. Atassi refused, however, claiming that his recent experience showed that France could not be trusted in its promises of independence. In 1943, rather than re-nominate himself, Atassi endorsed the election of Shukri al-Quwatli, a well-established Damascus leader who had risen to prominence under Atassi's patronage, as President of the Republic.

Atassi took no active part in the final struggle for independence but supported the Quwatli government, which lasted from 1943 to 1949. In 1947, while Syria was facing a prolonged cabinet crisis, President Quwatli called on his old mentor to form a government of national unity. Due to a tense political atmosphere, however, and increasing anti-Quwatli sentiment within political circles, Atassi was unable to intervene to save the administration. He also argued with President Quwatli over presidential authority and conditioned that it would have to be curtailed if he became prime minister, but Quwatli refused.

In March 1949, the Quwatli government was overthrown in a coup d'état by Chief of Staff Husni al-Za'im, who headed a military cabinet for four months before he himself was overthrown in August 1949. Following this development, leading politicians called on the aging Atassi to create a provisional government that would supervise national elections and the restoration of civilian rule. He complied and formed a cabinet that included representatives of all parties, including the leftist Baath Party of Michel Aflaq, who he appointed Minister of Agriculture. He released Munir al-Ajlani, who was imprisoned by Husni al-Za'im, and voted him into the Constitutional Assembly. Under Atassi's auspices, a new electoral law was adopted, and women voted for the first time in the election of 15 and 16 November 1949. Atassi served as Prime Minister from August to December 1949, after which a parliamentary majority nominated him for a second term as president.

=== Second term as President of Syria ===
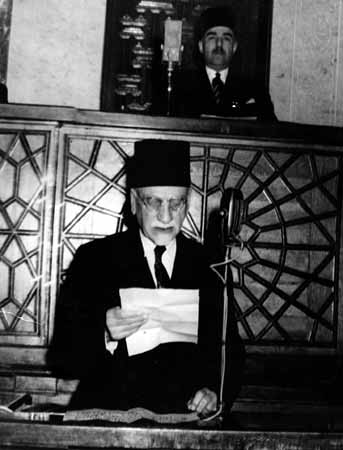
Hashem al-Atassi's second inaugural address, having been elected by a unanimous vote in Parliament on December 1949, succeeding the regime of Husni al-Za'im.

Atassi's second term in office was even more turbulent than his first. He came into conflict with the politicians of Damascus for supporting the interests of the Aleppo nobility and their desire to unite with Iraq. He supported the People's Party of Aleppo and appointed its leader Nazim al-Qudsi as prime minister. The party was vehemently pro-Iraq and sought a union with Baghdad. One of the Atassi administration's most memorable actions was the closure of Syria's border with Lebanon to prevent the rampant influx of Lebanese goods into Syria. From 1949 to 1951, he undertook serious talks with the Iraqi government over the union issue.

Atassi received senior Iraqi leaders in Damascus, including Crown Prince Abd al-Illah and Faisal II of Iraq, for technical discussions on union. This angered Syria's emerging military strongman Adib Shishakli, who claimed that the Hashemite family of Baghdad should have no jurisdiction over Damascus. Shishakli demanded a change in course, yet Atassi remained adamant and refused to submit to military pressure. In response, Shishakli arrested Atassi's Chief of Staff Sami al-Hinnawi, a People's Party sympathizer, and several pro-Iraqi officers in the Syrian Army. He then demanded that one of his right-hand-men, Colonel Fawzi Selu, be appointed Minister of Defense, to ensure that pro-Iraqi influence in Syria remained under control.

Fearing a head-on-clash with the military, Atassi reluctantly accepted the demands. In December 1951, however, President Atassi asked Maarouf al-Dawalibi, another member of the People's Party, to form a cabinet. Dawalibi accepted the job but refused to give the defense portfolio to Fawzi Selu. As a result, Shishakli launched another coup, arresting the prime minister and all members of the People's Party. All ministers and pro-Hashemite statesmen were also abducted, and Parliament was dissolved. In protest, President Atassi presented his resignation to the disbanded Parliament, refusing to submit it to Shishakli, on 24 December 1951.

=== Opposition to military rule ===
During the Shishakli years (1951 to 1954), Atassi spearheaded the opposition, claiming that the Shishakli government was unconstitutional. He rallied the support of disgruntled officers, pro-Hashemite politicians, and members of all outlawed political parties, and called for a national uprising. In February 1954, Shishakli responded by arresting his son Adnan and placing the veteran statesman under house arrest. Such was Atassi's stature in Syria as its elder statesman that Shishakli dared not subject him to the indignity of outright imprisonment.

The officers mutinied, political leaders mobilized against the government, and an armed uprising broke out in the Arab Mountain. On 24 February 1954, the government of Adib al-Shishakli was finally overthrown. Four days later, on 28 February, Atassi returned to Damascus from his home in Homs and reassumed his duties as president. He appointed Sabri al-Assali as Prime Minister, and restored all pre-Shishakli ambassadors, ministers, and parliamentarians to office. He tried to eradicate all traces of the four-year Shishakli dictatorship.

== Final years ==
In what remained of his term, the 80-year-old president tried to curb the influence of military officers and worked relentlessly against the leftist current that was brewing in Syria, characterized by socialist ideology, sympathies for the Soviet Union, and support for the policies of at the time Egyptian president Gamal Abdel Nasser, policies which were supported even among members of the president's own powerful clan, such as Jamal al-Atassi and Nureddin al-Atassi.

Unlike most Arab leaders, Atassi believed that Nasser was too young, inexperienced and ideological to lead the Arab world. The Syrian President cracked down on Nasserite elements and clashed with his own pro-Nasser Prime Minister Sabri al-Asali, accusing him of wanting to transform Syria into an Egyptian satellite. In 1955, the President was tempted to accept the Baghdad Pact, an Anglo-American agreement aimed at containing Communism in the region, but Nasserite elements in the Syrian Army prevented him from doing so. He rallied in support of Hashemite Iraq, whose leaders were competing with Nasser over pan-Arab leadership, and was allied to Iraqi Prime Minister Nuri al-Sa'id. Atassi then dissolved the cabinet of Assali and appointed Said al-Ghazzi followed by Faris al-Khoury, a moderate statesman, as Prime Minister. Atassi dispatched Khoury to Egypt to present Syrian objections to Egyptian hegemony over Arab affairs.

== Death and legacy ==
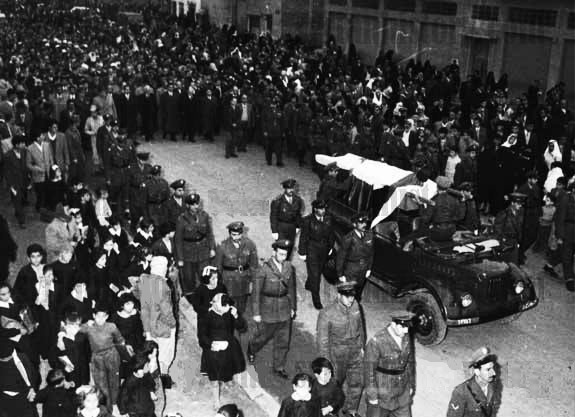
Hashem al-Atassi's funeral procession in Damascus, 6 December 1960.

He died in Homs during the union years with Egypt on 6 December 1960. He was given a state funeral, which was the largest in the history of the city, attended by senior members of the United Arab Republic (UAR) government of President Nasser.

Preceded by Mohammed Ali Bey al-Abed	President of Syria; 1936–1939	Succeeded by Bahij al-Khatib
Preceded by Sami al-Hinnawi (military rule)	President of Syria; 1949–1951	Succeeded by Adib Shishakli (military rule)
Preceded by Maamun al-Kuzbari (acting)	President of Syria; 1954–1955	Succeeded by Shukri al-Quwatli
