= Adib Shishakli =

Syrian military leader and politician (1909–1964)

- أديب الشيشكلي
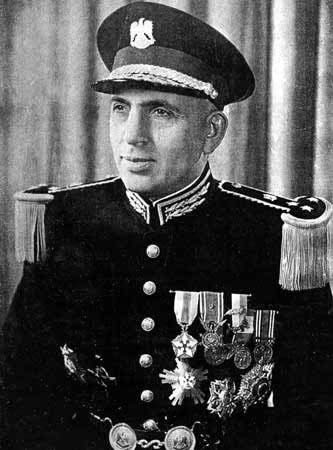

De facto leader of the First Syrian Republic and the Second Syrian Republic
- In office 19 December 1949 – 25 February 1954
- President: Hashim al-Atassi; Himself (acting); Fawzi Selu; Himself
- Prime Minister: Hashim al-Atassi; Nazim al-Qudsi; Khalid al-Azm; Nazim al-Qudsi; Khalid al-Azm; Hassan al-Hakim; Zaki al-Khatib (acting); Maarouf al-Dawalibi; Vacant; Fawzi Selu; Himself
- Vice President: Office wasn't established Maamun al-Kuzbari
- Preceded by: Sami al-Hinnawi
- Succeeded by: Maamun al-Kuzbari (As acting President of Syria)

President of Syria (military rule)
- In office 2 December 1951 – 3 December 1951
- Preceded by: Hashim al-Atassi
- Succeeded by: Fawzi Selu
- In office 11 July 1953 – 25 February 1954
- Vice President: Maamun al-Kuzbari
- Preceded by: Fawzi Selu
- Succeeded by: Maamun al-Kuzbari (acting)

Personal details
- Born: 1909 Hama, Syria Vilayet, Ottoman Syria, Ottoman Empire
- Died: 27 September 1964 (aged 55) Ceres, Goiás, Brazil
- Cause of death: Assassination by firearm
- Resting place: Buried in hometown Hama
- Party: Syrian Social Nationalist Party; Arab Liberation Movement
- Spouse: Fatina al-Fanari
- Education: Damascus Military Academy

Military service
- Allegiance: Second Syrian Republic
- Branch/service: Arab Liberation Army
- Rank: General
- Battles/wars: Great Syrian Revolt; First Arab-Israeli War

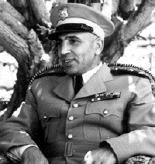
Shishakli in military uniform

Adib ash-Shishakli (1909 – 27 September 1964, Arabic: أديب الشيشكلي, romanized: ʾAdīb aš-Šīšaklī) was a Syrian military officer who served as President of Syria briefly in 1951 and later from 1953 to 1954. He was overthrown and later assassinated.

== Early life ==
Adib Shishakli was born in the Hama Sanjak of Ottoman Syria to a Sunni family. His mother was of Kurdish origin from the Barazi family while his father was a Syrian Turkmen. His family name, Shishakli, is a common surname derived from the Turkish word "çiçek", which means flower; çiçekli (Shishakli) therefore means someone or some place with flowers.

== Military and political career ==
Shishakli was commissioned during the French Mandate of Syria as an officer in the colonial military in 1930. He studied at the Military Academy of Damascus (which later was relocated to Homs) and became an early member of the Syrian Social Nationalist Party (SSNP), founded by Antun Saadeh, promoting the concept of a Greater Syria. His brother Salah was also a prominent member of the SSNP. Following Syria's independence from France, Shishakli commanded the 2nd Yarmouk Brigade of the volunteer-based Arab Liberation Army (ALA) in the 1948 Arab-Israeli War, launching the first major ALA operation in Palestine in the abortive assault on Qal'at Jiddin. His exploits on the front lines earned him a following among Syria’s officer corps.

The Arab defeat in the 1948 Arab-Israeli War was a motivating factor for the military coup led by Husni al-Za'im, which took place in 1949. Only months after al-Za'im's takeover, which shattered Syria's weak parliamentary system, Za'im was overthrown by a group of officers connected to the SSNP, including Shishakli and Zaim's old comrade, Colonel Sami al-Hinnawi, who led the new military junta.

Za'im had previously delivered the SSNP leader Antun Saadeh to the Lebanese authorities, who had him tried and executed for wanting to destroy the modern state of Lebanon. Reportedly, after Za'im was killed, Shishakli ripped off Za'im's bloodstained shirt and took it to Saadeh's widow, who was still in Syria, telling her, "We have avenged his murder!".

Shishakli worked with Sami al-Hinnawi, the new de facto ruler of Syria who refused to assume power on his own and who, instead, restored Syria's parliamentary system. Hinnawi became chief-of-staff of the Syrian Army. A veteran nationalist, Hashem al-Atassi, who had been president in the 1930s, became prime minister, and later president of Syria. Atassi wanted to create a union with Hashemite Iraq, something which Shishakli greatly opposed, claiming that Hinnawi was the driving force behind pro-Hashemite sentiment in Syria.

== Seizing power ==
In December 1949, Shishakli launched another coup, the third of that year, arresting Hinnawi to break Hashemite influence in Syria, but keeping Atassi at his post. He then ordered the assassination of Colonel Mohammad Nasser, the Air Force Commander, because he threatened Shishakli's popularity in the Syrian Army. All of this greatly weakened the pro-union elements in Syria but they continued to work for union with Hashemite Iraq through the Prime Minister, Nazim al-Kudsi.

Shishakli set the condition that any government had to include his right-hand-man, Fawzi Selu, as Minister for Defence, to curb Hashemite influence in the Syrian government. When Prime Minister Maarouf al-Dawalibi, a pro-Iraq politician from Aleppo, refused this demand, Shishakli responded on 28 November 1951 by arresting Dawalibi and his entire cabinet. He also had arrested all pro-Iraq politicians in Syria, including the leaders of the People's Party, Nazim al-Kudsi and Rushdi al-Kikhya. In protest, Atassi resigned from office and moved into the opposition. Pleased to get rid of this stubborn nationalist, who rejected military intervention in political affairs, Shishakli made his comrade Selu the Chief-of-Staff of the Army, the Prime Minister, the Minister for Defence, and the Head of State. But in effect, Selu was nothing but a figurehead. The real power lay in the hands of Adib al-Shishakli.

== Personal rule over Syria ==
Shishakli then dissolved all political parties in a return to military rule. He banned a number of newspapers and outlawed all newspapers that were not pro-Shishakli. Among those to suffer persecution under his rule were the National Party of Damascus, the People's Party of Aleppo, the Communist Party, the Baath Party, and the Syrian Muslim Brotherhood. He banished the Baath leaders Akram al-Hawrani, Michel Aflaq, and Salah al-Bitar to Lebanon, where they then actively worked against his regime.

He was a skilled public speaker and relied greatly on radio to transmit his speeches to the Syrian population. He became the initial Arab leader following independence to foster a cult of personality around himself, with his portraits adorning every shopfront. Moreover, he established a ministry dedicated to information and propaganda within his government. To ensure his control, he strategically deployed spies and security agents across the nation to vigilantly observe and suppress any signs of opposition against his rule. In August 1952, he established an official government party, the Arab Liberation Movement, but it was boycotted by powerful representatives of civilian political society, such as Hashim al-Atassi. The party was progressive and accepted women within its ranks. It called for a limited degree of socialism. Some said that he viewed himself as "an Arab Caesar." In mid-1953 Shishakli staged an election to make himself President, but he was by now facing mounting dissent.

== Foreign relations ==
As leader of Syria, Shishakli sought good relations with Western countries, but maintained Syria's uncompromising stance towards Israel. Syrian relations with the Hashemite monarchies of Jordan and Iraq were poor during his presidency, but he also mistrusted the rapid spread of Nasserism. Many believe that Nasser's Free Officer Revolution of 1952 in Egypt had been modeled after Shishakli's own coups of 1949 and 1951. Shishakli's developed strong relations with King Ibn Saud of Saudi Arabia, his son, King Saud bin Abdulaziz Al Saud, and King Talal of Jordan.

Shishakli with Egyptian President Mohamed Naguib in Demascus, c. 1953

Shishakli greatly liked King Talal who said that he had no ambitions in Syria, unlike his father King Abdullah I. Despite his pro-Western outlook and family background, Shishakli recognized the desires of Syria's Arab majority and accordingly adopted a policy of pan-Arabism. He clashed frequently with the independent-minded Druze minority on the Jabal al-Druze mountain range, accusing them of wanting to topple his regime using funds from Jordan. In 1954, he resorted to shelling Druze strongholds in Jabal al-Druze to put down resistance to his rule.

His relations with both Britain and the United States were mixed. Britain courted Shishakli during the early period of his rule in the hope that Syria would join plans for a British-led Middle East Defence Organization. The United States offered Shishakli considerable sums of money to settle Palestinian refugees in Syria and turn them into Syrians. Shishakli, although tempted by these offers of Western arms and money, did not take them. The Palestinian situation had soured the Syrian view of the West. Syria wanted revenge rather than to accept defeat and repair Syria's damaged relations with the West and make peace with Israel.

== Downfall and death ==
Shishakli also had arrested a lot of active officers in the Syrian Army, including the young Adnan al-Malki, a prominent Baathist. The largest anti-Shishakli conference had been held in Atassi's home in Homs. Leading the anti-Shishakli movement were Atassi and the veteran Druze leader Sultan al-Atrash. Shishakli had responded by arresting Atassi's son Adnan and Atrash's son Mansur (both of whom were ranking politicians in Syria).

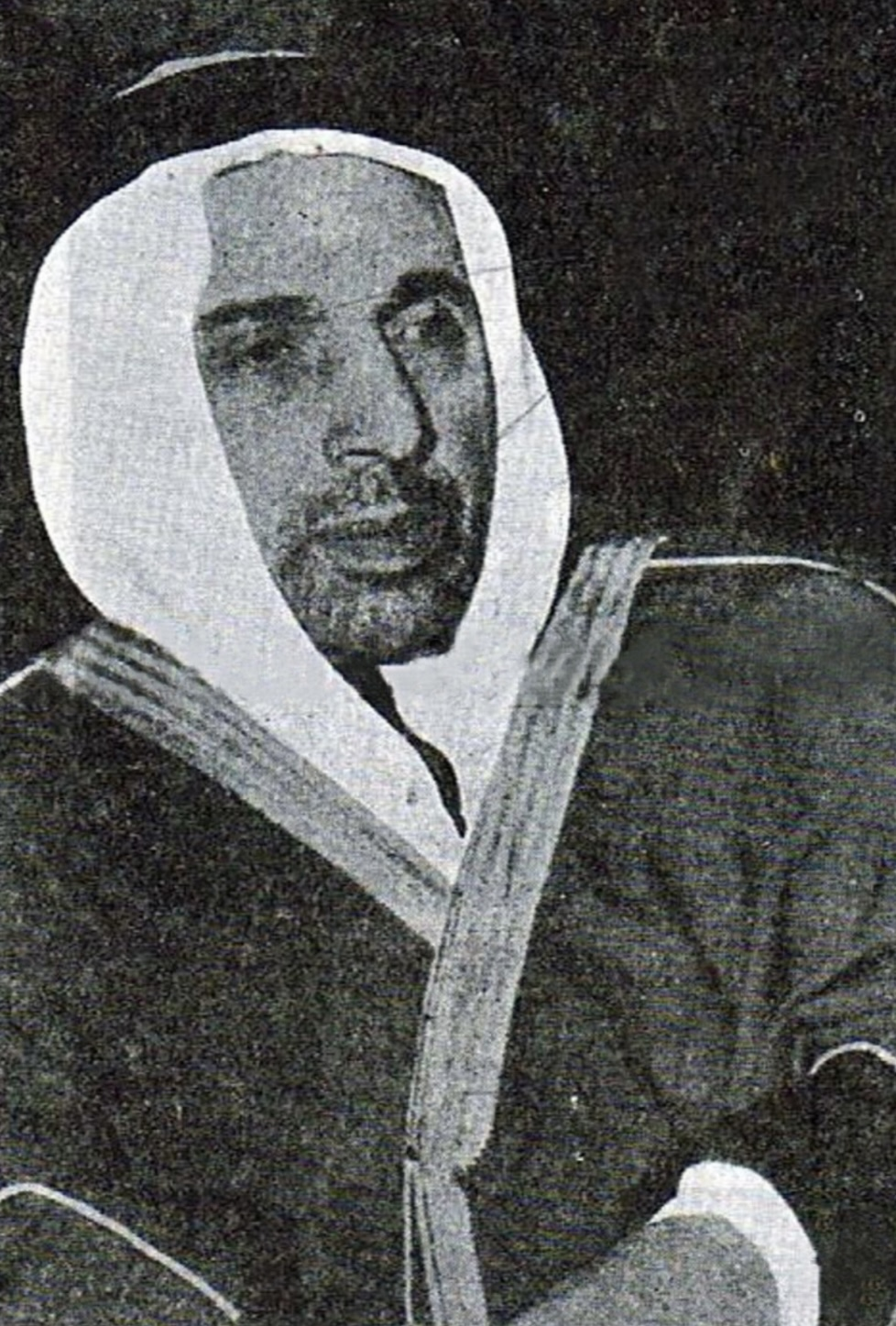
Shishakli in exile soon after his overthrowing, Saudi Arabia.

Growing discontent eventually led to another coup on 23 February 1954 which overthrew Shishakli. The coup was led by Hashem al-Atassi and military officers from his family and veteran Druze leader Sultan al-Atrash as well as Druze officers, the Syrian Communist Party and Ba'ath Party members.

When the insurgency reached its peak, Shishakli backed down, refusing to drag Syria into civil war. He fled to Lebanon, but when the Druze leader Kamal Jumblat threatened to have him killed, he fled to Brazil. Prior to the union between Syria and Egypt in 1958, Shishakli toyed with the idea of returning to Syria to launch a coup d'état, using funds provided by Iraq. The coup was foiled by Syrian intelligence and Shishakli was sentenced to death in absentia.

On 27 September 1964, Shishakli was assassinated in Ceres, Brazil by Nawaf Ghazaleh, a Syrian Druze who sought revenge for his parents who had died leaving him an orphan during the bombardment of Jabal Druze.

== Sources and further reading ==
- Joshua Landis, Shishakli and the Druze: Integration and Intransigence
- Sami Moubayed, Steel & Silk: Men and Women Who Shaped Syria 1900-2000 (Cune Press, 2005).
- Christopher Solomon, Remember Syria's Adib Shishakli, September 27, 2016, Syria Comment

| Preceded by Husni al-Za'im | President of Syria; 1953–1954 | Succeeded by Hashim al-Atassi |
