= Muhsin al-Barazi government =

1949 Syrian government

- 40th government of the Syrian Republic

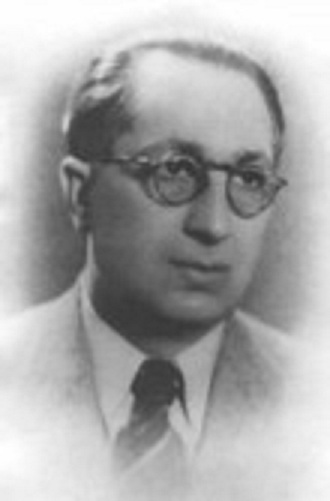
- Date formed: 26 June 1949
- Date dissolved: 14 August 1949

People and organisations
- President: Husni al-Za'im
- Prime Minister: Muhsin al-Barazi
- No. of ministers: 6

History
- Outgoing formation: Aug. 1949 coup d'état
- Legislature term: None
- Predecessor: al-Za'im
- Successor: al-Atassi II

The Muhsin al-Barazi government was the fortieth government in the history of modern Syria and the twenty-fifth administration of the First Syrian Republic. Formed on 1 July 1949, it was the second and final government established under the rule of President Husni al-Za'im following his military coup earlier that year. The cabinet was headed by Muhsin al-Barazi, a close associate of al-Za'im, and functioned during a period marked by the consolidation of military authority in Syrian politics.

The government remained in office for only forty-five days. Its tenure ended abruptly on 14 August 1949, when a military coup led by Sami al-Hinnawi overthrew the regime of Husni al-Za'im. Following the coup, a special military tribunal sentenced both al-Za'im and Prime Minister al-Barazi to death, and the sentences were carried out shortly thereafter. The fall of the government marked the end of the al-Za'im era and the beginning of a new phase of political instability characterised by successive military interventions in Syrian governance.

== Composition ==
Portfolio	Minister	Took office	Left office	Party
Prime Minister	Muhsin al-Barazi	26 June 1949	14 August 1949	Independent
Minister of Interior	Muhsin al-Barazi	26 June 1949	14 August 1949	Independent
Minister of Foreign Affairs	Muhsin al-Barazi	26 June 1949	14 August 1949	Independent
Minister of Justice	Mustafa al-Shihabi	26 June 1949	14 August 1949	Independent
Minister of Education	Khalil Mardam Bey	18 April 1949	14 August 1949	Independent
Minister of Health and Ambulance	Khalil Mardam Bey	18 April 1949	14 August 1949	Independent
Minister of Finance	Hasan Jabbarah	16 December 1948	14 August 1949	Independent
Minister of National Economy	Hasan Jabbarah	19 April 1949	14 August 1949	Independent
Minister of Agriculture	Nuri al-Ibish	16 April 1949	14 August 1949	Independent
Minister of Public Works	Fathallah Saqqal	19 April 1949	14 August 1949	Independent
Minister of National Defense	Abdullah Atfeh	26 June 1949	14 August 1949	Independent

== See also ==
- Council of Ministers (Syria)
- List of Syrian governments
- Government ministries of Syria
- List of prime ministers of Syria
