= December 1949 Syrian coup d'état =

Bloodless coup that overthrew Hashim al-Atassi

- Part of the Arab Cold War
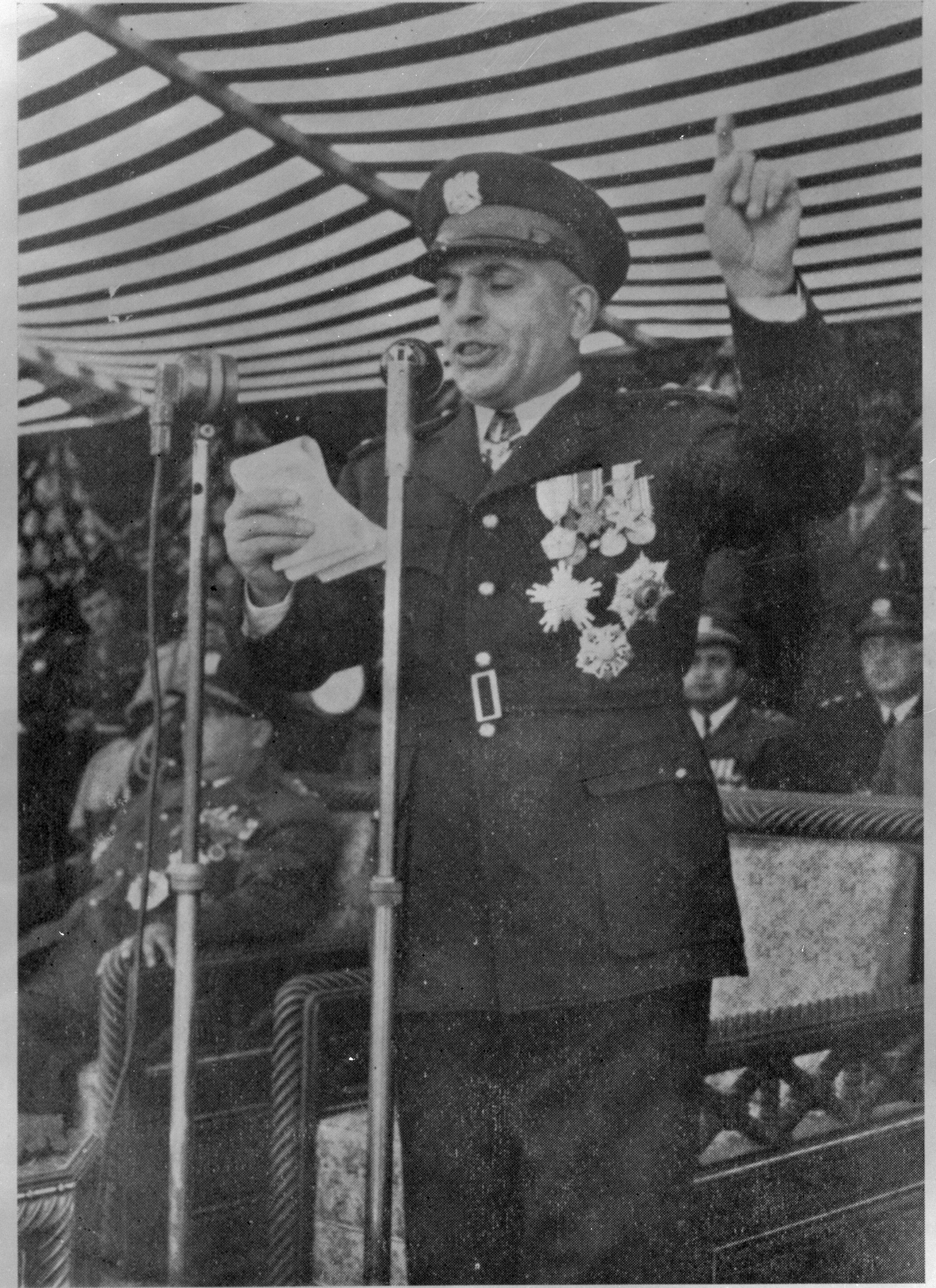
- Adib Shishakli in 1951.
Date	19 December, 1949
Location	Syria
Result	De facto leader of Syria Sami al-Hinnawi resigns Adib Shishakli becomes de facto leader Syria

Belligerents
Syrian government	Syrian Armed Forces coup plotters

Commanders and leaders
Sami al-Hinnawi; Muhammad As'ad Talas; Mahmoud al-Rifa'i; Muhammad Ma'ruf	Adib Shishakli; Fadlallah Abu Mansour; Amin Abu Assaf; Anwar Bannud

The December 1949 Syrian coup d'état, also known as the Colonels' movement (Arabic: حركة العقداء) took place on 19 December 1949, marking the third and final military takeover in Syria that year. The movement was led by Colonel Adib Shishakli, who ended the 4-month rule of Sami al-Hinnawi, who had come to power in a previous coup in August.

== Background ==
After the August 1949 coup, new leader Sami al-Hinnawi appointed Hashim al-Atassi to be prime minister. During the 1949 parliamentary election, the pro-Iraqi People's Party won a majority, which supported Hinnawi's efforts at realizing the Fertile Crescent Plan.

However, many supporters of Syrian nationalism did not agree with this proposal. As early as October 1949, the CIA reported growing opposition to efforts towards closer ties with Iraq or Jordan. Organizations such as the Muslim Brotherhood, Ba'ath Party, Syrian Communist Party, and Ulamas, claim that these efforts posed a threat to Syria's independence. Some officers also argued that the provisional government had no right to make such commitments.

Prior to the coup, Adib Shishakli had the support of Akram al-Hourani, who was the minister of defense during the government of Khalid al-Azm. Additionally, he was also Shishakli's personal friend and colleague from during the 1948 Arab-Israeli War. Shishakli's coup plan also received support from Lieutenant Fadlallah Abu Mansour, whom he met about the action at Qaboun, near Damascus.

== Process ==
At the helm of the First Brigade, Adib Shishakli launched his anti-Iraq move on December 19, which aimed to expel Sami al-Hinnawi's faction. The coup was triggered by Hinnawi's decision to appoint Major Subhi Ibara as the new commander of the local armored battalion. This measure was seen as an affront by the conspirators, as the previous commander, Amin Abu Assaf, was an adherent of Shishakli's movement. The conspirators promptly arrested the new commander, and at 5:30 a.m., armored vehicles began advancing on Damascus.

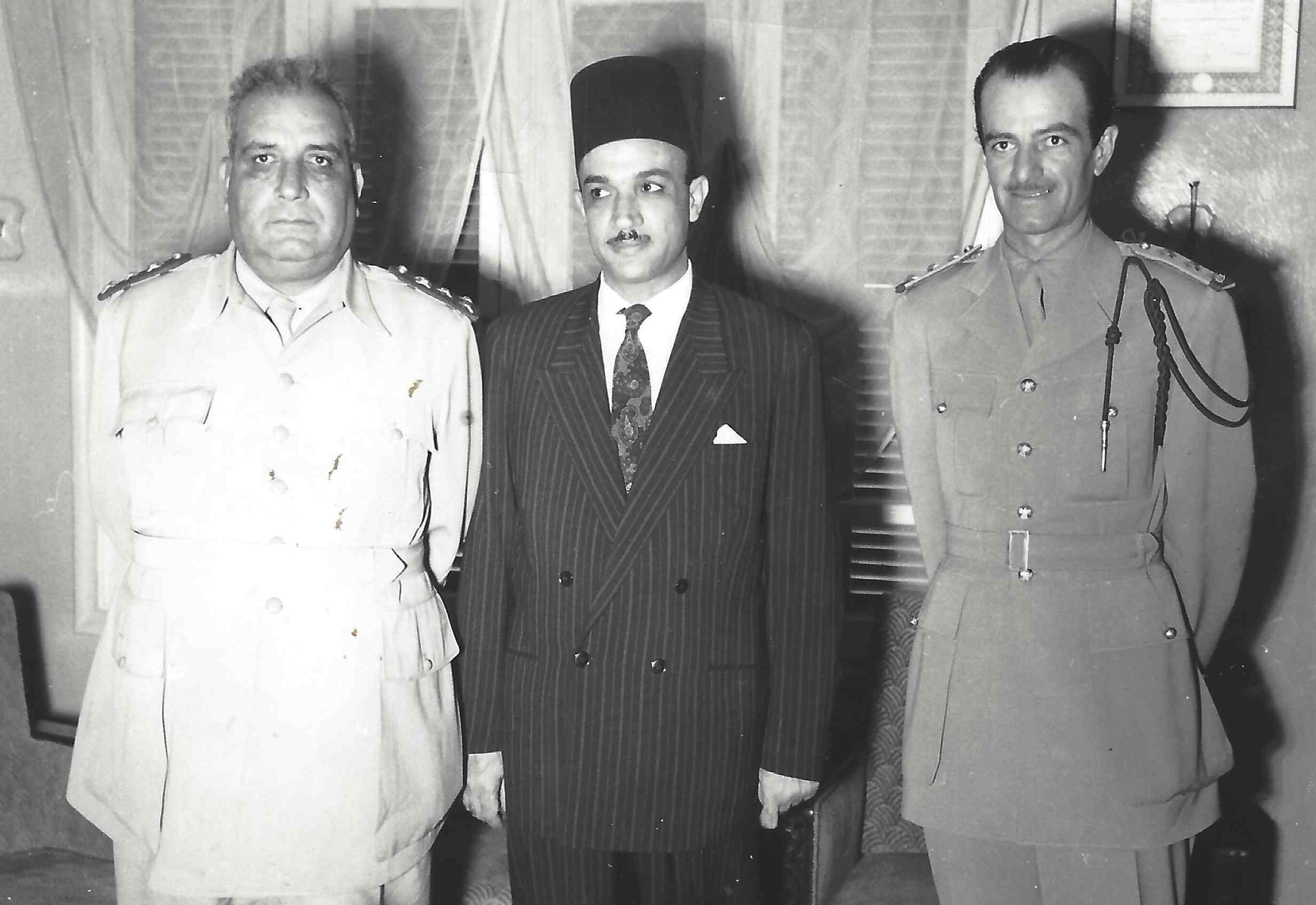
Sami al-Hinnawi alongside Muhammad As'ad Talas and Khaled Jada.

Shishakli's forces then took over government buildings, a bank, and a radio station. The military also surrounded the house of President Hashim al-Atassi. After a brief battle, Shishakli's forces managed to detain Hinnawi and several officers associated with the regime. The coup forces also targeted for arrest other key figures associated with Hinnawi, including: Muhammad As'ad Talas, Hinnawi's brother-in-law, Mahmoud al-Rifa'i, director of the Second Bureau, and Muhammad Ma'ruf, head of military police. However, As'ad Tallas, who had played a key role in negotiations with Iraq, managed to escape the country with assistance from an Iraqi minister.

After being captured, Sami al-Hinnawi was transferred to Mezzeh prison, where he remained until September 1950, when he was released and exiled to Lebanon. Shortly thereafter, he was assassinated by Hersho al-Barazi, a relative of Prime Minister Muhsin al-Barazi, who had been executed by Hinnawi during his military coup in August.

In a statement broadcast on Radio Damascus, Shishakli denounced the maneuvers of Army Chief Sami al-Hinnawi and his deputy As'ad Talas, accusing them of "conspiring against the republican system of Syria." Shishakli announced that he acted to prevent a union with Iraq and preserve Syria's independence. Shishakli notably did not remove Syria's civilian government, who kept the president and prime minister in power. As a counterbalance to Atassi's presidency, Shishakli created the 'Council of Colonels' (later replaced by the Supreme Military Council), a body composed of minority officers that allowed him to exert influence over governance.

=== Role of the U.S. ===
Unlike the previous March 1949 coup, this coup was likely carried out without the involvement of CIA. However, such a change of power in Syria was in line with American interest, since closer Syrian-Iraqi ties would likely increase the stature of the United Kingdom. Additionally, British oil companies in Iraq would also secure a stronger control of regional oil pipelines. Lastly, Hinnawi was not particularly interested in the Trans-Arabian Pipeline, and was also considered more left-wing.

== Aftermath ==
=== Foreign policy ===
Following the coup, Shishkali quickly took action to bring a halt to a potential Syria-Iraq union. He also increased Syria's ties with Saudi Arabia and Egypt as he distanced ties with Iraq.

None of the Western powers, mainly the United States, France, or the United Kingdom, wanted to make deals with the new Syrian government due to Syria's recent role fighting against Israel during the 1948 Arab-Israeli War. Instead, the US brought closer relations between Turkey and Saudi Arabia, the UK with Iraq and Jordan, and France with Lebanon.

=== Domestic affairs ===
The December 1949 coup marked the beginning of a period of 'dual rule' in Syria, where the government of Hashim al-Atassi and the military council led by Adib al-Shishakli shared control over the country.

Despite announcements and attempts to restore constitutional order, the 5 years of Shishakli's administration was characterized by political instability. Between 1950 and 1951, the Syrian parliament established 7 government coalitions, alternating between ones led by the National Party and ones led by its rival People's Party.

In November 1951, President Hashim al-Atassi asked Maarouf al-Dawalibi to form a government. Previously, Adib Shishakli enforced an unofficial rule, where governments would appoint a military officer as the minister of defense to maintain the military's influence. However, Dawalibi was opposed to the rule of officers and often blamed them for the country's situation. After appointing a civilian into the position, Shishakli carried out the 1951 coup, where he arrested Prime Minister Dawalibi and forced the entire government to resign.

== Bibliography ==
- Moubayed, Sami M. (2006), Steel & Silk: Men and Women who Shaped Syria 1900-2000, Cune Press, ISBN 978-1-8859-4241-8
- Al-Baidhani, Ibraheem Saeed (2014). U.S. Policy Toward Syria – 1949 to 1958. ISBN 9781493190942.
- Out of the Inferno? Rebuilding Security in Iraq, Libya, Syria, and Yemen, Arab Reform Initiative, 2017, ISBN 979-10-93214-05-4, archived from the original on 2025-03-30
- Haddad, George Meri (1965). Revolutions and Military Rule in the Middle East Volume 2: The Arab States Part I: Iraq, Syria, Lebanon and Jordan. Robert Speller and Sons, Publishers. ISBN 978-0831500603.
- Seale, Patrick (1965). The Struggle for Syria—A Study of Post-War Arab Politics, 1945-1958. Oxford University Press.
- Rathmell, Andrew (1995). Secret War in the Middle East: The Covert Struggle for Syria, 1949–1961. Tauris Academic Studies. ISBN 1850439923.
