= List of Syrian coups d'état =

Several coups d'état have taken place throughout the modern history of Syria.

== List ==
Syrian coups d'état
Coup d'état	Brief description	Refs.
March 1949 Syrian coup d'état	A bloodless coup and the first coup in the nation's modern history. The coup was led by Husni al-Za'im and led to the overthrow of president Shukri al-Quwatli.	
August 1949 Syrian coup d'état	A coup led by Sami al-Hinnawi that overthrew Husni al-Za'im.	
December 1949 Syrian coup d'état	A coup led by Adib Shishakli, overthrowing the four-month rule of Sami al-Hinnawi.	
1951 Syrian coup d'état	A coup led by Adib Shishakli, forcing president Hashim al-Atassi and prime minister Maarouf al-Dawalibi to resign. The civilian government was replaced with a military dictatorship.	
1954 Syrian coup d'état	A coup led by Hashim al-Atassi and Sultan al-Atrash to remove Adib Shishakli from power. A civilian government was restored.	
1961 Syrian coup d'état	An uprising by Syrian Army officers resulting in the break-up of the United Arab Republic and the creation of the Second Syrian Republic.	
1962 Syrian coup attempt	A failed coup led by Abdul Karim al-Nahlawi against Nazim al-Qudsi.	
1963 Syrian coup d'état	A coup resulting in the seizure of power by the Syrian branch of the Ba'ath Party.	
1966 Syrian coup d'état	The National Command of the Ba'ath Party was removed from power by the Syrian Ba'ath Party, led by Salah Jadid.	
1966 Syrian mutiny	Failed coup led by Salim Hatum against Salah Jadid. Hatum fled to Jordan after its failure, and was executed when he attempted to return to Syria.	
Corrective Movement	A 1970 bloodless coup led by Hafez al-Assad, resulting in ideological revisionism in the Ba'ath Party.	
1984 Syrian coup attempt	A failed coup in which Rifaat al-Assad attempted to overthrow his brother, Hafez al-Assad. Conflict was averted and Rifaat was exiled from 1984 until 2021.	
Fall of the Assad regime	A major event of the Syrian Civil War resulting in the 2024 overthrow of Ba'athist Syria by the Syrian opposition, spearheaded by Hay'at Tahrir al-Sham, the Southern Operations Room, and the Syrian National Army. Bashar al-Assad fled to Russia following the fall of Damascus and the Syrian caretaker government was established.	
