= Anwar Bannud =

Syrian Army Chief of Staff

- أنور بنود

Chief of Staff of the Syrian Army
- In office 2 January 1950 – 23 April 1951
- Preceded by: Sami al-Hinnawi
- Succeeded by: Fawzi Selu

Personal details
- Born: 1908 Aleppo, Aleppo Vilayet, Ottoman Syria, Ottoman Empire
- Died: 1979 (aged 70–71)

Military service
- Allegiance: French Mandate of Syria (1921–1946); Syria (1946–1954)
- Rank: Brigadier
- Battles/wars: 1948 Arab–Israeli War

Anwar Bannud (Arabic: أنور بنود) (1908–1979) was a Syrian military officer who served as the chief-of-staff of the Syrian Army from 1950 to 1951.

== Career ==
=== Early career ===
Bannud began his military career at the Military Academy in Damascus. After his graduation in 1925, he served as an officer in the Army of the Levant. His service was distinguished and he rose quickly in the ranks to become a Colonel, the only Syrian officer to achieve that rank under the French mandate. In 1944 Bannud was appointed director of the Homs Military Academy, where he encouraged students to mutiny against the French occupation forces.

=== Independence ===
Bannud joined the newly established Syrian Army after French troops left Syria. When the 1948 Arab–Israeli War began, Bannud joined the Arab Liberation Army (ALA) under Fawzi al-Qawuqji, and became a commanding officer in the war. Bannud replaced Qawuqji after the latter resigned on 26 October 1948.

Bannud blamed the civilian leadership in Damascus for the defeat in 1948 War, and supported the military coup of Chief-of-Staff Husni al-Zaim in March 1949 that overthrew President Shukri al-Quwatli. Bannud was appointed deputy chief-of-staff. However, he became disillusioned with al-Zaim's leadership and participated in a military coup against him on 14 August 1949. Four months later, Bannud, the commander of Aleppo garrison at the time, supported Adib Shishakli in a third successive coup in December 1949. As a reward for his loyalty, Shishakli, while preferring himself to stay behind the scenes as deputy chief-of-staff, appointed Bannud as chief-of-staff on 2 January 1950.

Nevertheless, his popularity in the army arose Shishkali's suspicion, and Bannud was dismissed on 23 April 1951, and exiled under the pretense of a military attaché post at the Syrian embassy in Ankara, Turkey. Bannud obliged, and he served at his post until the 1954 military coup that overthrew Shishakli's government.

== Bibliography ==
- Haddad, George Meri (1965). Revolutions and Military Rule in the Middle East Volume 2: The Arab States Part I: Iraq, Syria, Lebanon and Jordan. Robert Speller and Sons, Publishers. ISBN 978-0831500603.
- Moubayed, Sami M. (2000). Damascus Between Democracy and Dictatorship. University Press of America. ISBN 978-0-7618-1744-4.
- Moubayed, Sami M. (2006). Steel & Silk: Men & Women Who Shaped Syria 1900-2000. Cune Press. ISBN 1-885942-41-9.
- Nowar, Maʾan Abu (2003). The Jordanian-Israeli War 1948-1951: A History of the Hashemite Kingdom of Jordan. Garnet & Ithaca Press. ISBN 9780863722868.
- Seale, Patrick (1986). The struggle for Syria: a study of post-war Arab politics, 1945-1958. I.B. Tauris. ISBN 9781850430285.
