= James Hugh Keeley Jr. =

American diplomat (1895–1985)

U.S. Envoy Extraordinary and Minister Plenipotentiary to Syria
- In office 1947–1950
- Preceded by: George Wadsworth
- Succeeded by: Cavendish W. Cannon

Personal details
- Born: November 27, 1895
- Died: January 20, 1985 (aged 89)

James Hugh Keeley Jr. (November 27, 1895 – January 20, 1985) was an American diplomat.

== Biography ==
Keeley graduated from the American University of Beirut in 1931. He served in the United States Foreign Service from 1920 until his retirement in the early 1960s, most notably as the United States' second envoy to the newly independent nation of Syria. He was the father of Edmund Keeley and Robert V. Keeley.

=== Involvement in the Syrian Coup of 1949 ===
On 30 March 1949, Col. Husni al-Za'im seized power from President Shukri al-Quwatli in a bloodless coup d'état. There are "highly controversial" allegations that the American legation in Syria—headed by James Hugh Keeley Jr.—and CIA engineered the coup. Assistant military attaché (and undercover CIA officer) Stephen J. Meade, who became intimately acquainted with Colonel Za'im several weeks prior to the coup and was considered Za'im's "principal Western confidant" during Za'im's brief time in power, has been described as the coup's architect—along with the CIA's Damascus station chief, Miles Copeland Jr. Copeland later authored several books with "extraordinarily detailed accounts of CIA operations in, among other countries, Syria, Egypt, and Iran," considered "one of the most revelatory set of writings by a former U.S. intelligence officer ever published." However, Copeland's memoirs have a strong literary quality and contain many embellishments, making it difficult to gauge the historical accuracy of the events he describes. Moreover, Copeland's account of the Syrian coup in his 1989 autobiography The Game Player: Confessions of the CIA's Original Political Operative contradicts the earlier version presented in his 1969 The Game of Nations: The Amorality of Power Politics.

In The Game of Nations, Copeland suggested that Syria—as the first former colony in the Arab world to achieve complete political independence from Europe—was perceived in Washington as a test case for America's "capacity for exerting a democratizing influence on Arab countries." According to Copeland, the CIA attempted to "police" the July 1947 Syrian national elections, which were marred by fraud, sectarianism, and interference by neighboring Iraq and Transjordan. When these elections "produced a weak, minority government" under Quwatli—the stability of which was called into question by Syria's defeat in the 1948 Arab–Israeli War—Keeley and other U.S. officials became concerned "that Syria was on the verge of complete collapse," which could have empowered the Syrian Communist Party or other "radicals" (such as the Ba'ath Party and the Muslim Brotherhood). As a result, Keeley became amenable to a military coup "as a way of safeguarding ... the long-term prospects of democracy in the country." At Keeley's behest, Copeland wrote, Meade "systematically developed a friendship with Za'im ... suggested to him the idea of a coup d'état, advised him how to go about it, and guided him through the intricate preparations in laying the groundwork for it."

Available evidence, however, suggests that Za'im was in little need of prodding from the U.S. According to the British military attaché in Syria, Za'im had been contemplating a coup since March 1947—over a year before he was introduced to Meade on November 30, 1948. Shortly before the coup, Za'im tried to win Western sympathy by producing a list of individuals, including Keeley, that were supposedly "communist assassination targets," but U.S. officials were skeptical. While Za'im directly informed Meade of the upcoming coup on March 3 and March 7, the U.S. was not the only foreign power apprised: Za'im notified British officials around the same time. In his conversations with Meade, Za'im outlined his progressive political program for Syria (including land reform) as well as the communist threat, concluding "[there is] only way to start the Syrian people along the road to progress and democracy: With the whip." Za'im struck a different tone in conversations with the British, citing his desire to establish friendlier ties with Britain's major allies in the area—Iraq and Transjordan. In The Game Player, Copeland provided new details on the American assistance to Za'im's plan, expounding that Meade identified specific installations that had to be captured to ensure the coup's success. However, Copeland also acknowledged that Za'im had initiated the plot on his own: "It was Husni's show all the way." Douglas Little notes that U.S. assistant secretary of state George C. McGhee visited Damascus in March, "ostensibly to discuss resettling Palestinian refugees but possibly to authorize U.S. support for Za'im." In contrast, Andrew Rathmell describes this hypothesis as "purely speculative." Once in power, Za'im enacted a number of policies that benefited the U.S.: He ratified the construction on Syrian territory of the Trans-Arabian Pipeline (Tapline) (which had been stalled in the Syrian parliament), banned the Communist Party, and signed an armistice with Israel.

== Bibliography ==
- Wilford, Hugh (2013). America's Great Game: The CIA's Secret Arabists and the Making of the Modern Middle East. Basic Books. ISBN 9780465019656.

Diplomatic posts
Preceded by George Wadsworth	U.S. Envoy Extraordinary and Minister Plenipotentiary to Syria; 1947–1950	Succeeded by Cavendish W. Cannon
