= Abdullah Atfeh =

Syrian military officer

Abdullah Atfeh عبدالله عطفة
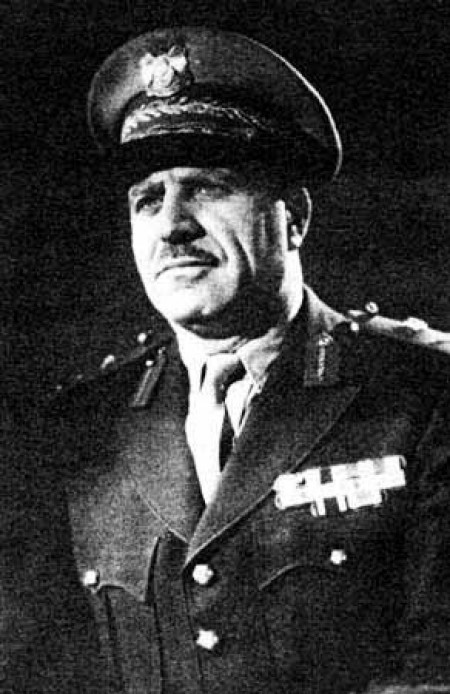

Minister of Defense
- In office 1 July 1949 – 28 December 1949
- Prime Minister: Muhsin al-Barazi; Hashim al-Atassi
- Preceded by: Husni al-Za'im
- Succeeded by: Akram al-Hawrani

Chief of Staff of the Syrian Army
- In office 1947–1948
- Preceded by: office established
- Succeeded by: Husni al-Zaim

Personal details
- Born: 1897 Khirbet Ghazaleh, Ottoman Syria, Ottoman Empire
- Died: 1976 (aged 78–79) Damascus, Syria

Military service
- Allegiance: Ottoman Empire (1915–1918); Arab Kingdom of Syria (1919–1920); French Mandate of Syria (1921–1946); Syria (1945–1950)
- Rank: Major General

Abdullah Atfeh (Arabic: عبدالله عطفة; 1897–1976) was a Syrian career military officer who served as the first chief of staff of the Syrian Army after the country's independence.

== Career ==
=== Early career ===
Abdullah Atfeh began his military career at the Ottoman Military Academy in Istanbul. After his graduation in 1915, he served as an officer in the Ottoman Army. He defected in 1916 to join the Arab Revolt led by Sharif Hussein against the Ottomans.

After the end of World War I and the defeat of the Ottoman Empire, Atfeh joined the newly created Syrian Army under King Faisal I. Following the defeat at Maysalun and the French occupation of Syria in 1920, the Syrian Army was dissolved and Atfeh fled to Jordan to avoid arrest. He returned in 1921 following a general amnesty.

Atfeh joined the Army of the Levant, which was created by France, and received advanced military training at the École Supérieure de Guerre in 1938. Atfeh rose in the ranks and by World War II he became commander of Syria's coastal region. During the 1945 uprising in Damascus, Atfeh led his troops to mutiny against the French.

=== Syrian Army ===
The last French troops left Syria in 1946 and the country regained its independence. Syrian president Shukri al-Quwatli appointed Atfeh as chief of staff of the newly formed Syrian Army. The army was formed around the nucleus of the French-led Army of the Levant, and Atfeh was tasked with ensuring the allegiance of the army to the Syrian Republic.

Atfeh continued his role as chief of staff when the 1948 Arab–Israeli War broke out. Syrian troops suffered heavy losses during the first days of the war. Atfeh, along with Minister of Defense Ahmad al-Sharabati, were considered the principal parties responsible for the poor preparation and management of the war. Consequently, Atfeh was relieved from his duties soon after and replaced with then-Director of Public Security, Husni al-Za'im. In 1949, al-Za'im led a military coup that overthrew the al-Quwatli's government, and appointed Atfeh as his defense minister. Al-Za'im's rule lasted around five months, and in August 1949 Atfeh switched his allegiances again and supported the politicians that replaced him. After the 1949 elections Atfeh was appointed minister of defense by Syria's new president, Hashim al-Atassi. However, his term did not last long and he was relieved from his post after three months, after which he retired from public life.
