= Syrian uprising =

Syrian uprising may refer to:

- Great Syrian Revolt (1925–1927), the largest and longest-lasting anti-colonial insurgency in the inter-war Arab East
- Islamist uprising in Syria (1976–1982), a series of revolts and armed insurgency by Sunni Islamists
- Syrian revolution (2011–2024), a series of protests and armed struggles to overthrow the Baathist regime in Syria

== See also ==
- Syrian revolution (disambiguation)
- Syrian War (disambiguation)
