= Syrian revolution (disambiguation) =

Syrian Revolution may refer to:

- Hananu Revolt, 1921
- Great Syrian Revolt, 1925–1927
- 1963 Syrian coup d'état, known as March 8 Revolution.
- Islamist uprising in Syria, 1976–1982
- Syrian Revolution (2011–2024) as part of the Syrian civil war or more specifically:
  - The 2024 Syrian opposition offensives leading to the Fall of the Assad regime
  - National Coalition of Syrian Revolutionary and Opposition Forces, Coalition of Syrian opposition groups (founded 2012, dissolved 2025)
    - Syrian Salvation Government, Ahmed al-Sharaa's quasi-state before the fall of Assad regime
    - Syrian Interim Government, quasi-state where the Coalition excersized control over the turkish-occupied territories of Syria
  - Syrian Revolution Victory Conference
  - Syrian caretaker government, Provisional government of Syria (2024–2025)
  - Syrian transitional government, Current government of Syria (since 2025)

== See also ==
- Syrian uprising (disambiguation)
- Syrian War (disambiguation)
