= August 1949 Syrian coup d'état =

Rise to power of Sami al-Hinnawi

- Part of The Cold War and the Pre-Arab Cold War
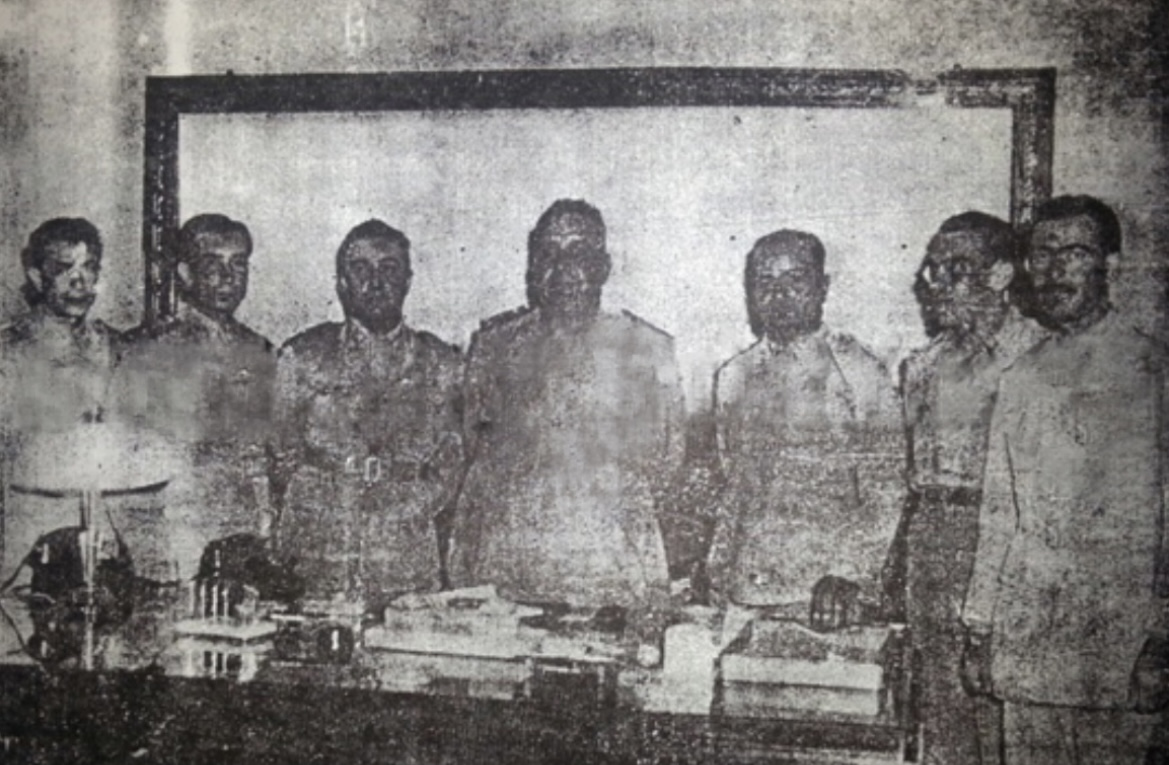
- Syrian officers after the coup.
Date	13–14 August 1949
Location	Syria
Result	Overthrow of Zaim's regime Sami al-Hinnawi becomes interim President; Husni al-Za'im and Muhsin al-Barazi were executed Higher War Council also called Supreme War Council established

Belligerents
Syrian government	Syrian Armed Forces coup plotters

Commanders and leaders
Husni al-Za'im (executed) (President of Syria); Muhsin al-Barazi (executed) (Prime Minister of Syria)	Sami al-Hinnawi; Muhammad Asaad Talas

The August 1949 Syrian coup d'état was the second in a series of successive coup attempts in Syria that occurred in 1949. It was led by Colonel Sami al-Hinnawi, who assisted in the earlier coup attempt in March that toppled the weak Republican government of Shukri al-Quwatli and brought Colonel Husni al-Zaim to power. The August coup marked the end of Zaim's short-lived regime, which lasted approximately 137 days.

Similarly, Hinnawi's rule did not last much longer, and his lofty ambitions of uniting Syria with Hashemite Iraq - dubbed the "Fertile Crescent" plan - ultimately triggered his downfall. On December 19, 1949, he was ousted by Colonel Adib al-Shishakli.

== Background ==
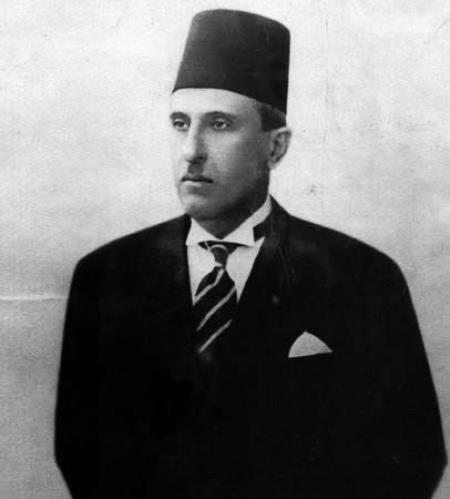
The official portrait of President Shukri al-Quwatli when elected to office for his term

On March 30, 1949, the military, led by Colonel Husni Zaim, overthrew Syria's democratically elected government under President Shukri al-Quwatli; the coup attempt was driven by general dissatisfaction with the Quwatli administration following Syria's disastrous performance during the 1948 Arab-Israeli War. The Syrian army's defeat in the war heavily tarnished its image, and subsequent armistice negotiations with Israel left it demoralized and rebellious.

Tensions escalated when the government announced cuts to the defense budget, implicitly holding the military responsible for the Palestinian fiasco. Quwatli's proposal to replace the professional army with a militia system further alarmed military officers, as it threatened their authority and influence.

Internationally, Quwatli's administration lacked foreign backing as it was viewed unfavorably by the West due to its nativist and isolationist policies. A British diplomat even described the Quwatli administration as embodying a "cult of independence and isolation". America, in particular, was concerned about Syria's reluctance to support the construction of the Trans-Arabian Pipeline (Tapline) project, a vital oil pipeline from Saudi Arabia to Lebanon that was considered a key part of US interests in the Middle East. Originally, the pipeline was to end in Haifa, Palestine, but Israel's creation in 1948 forced the route to pass through Jordan and Syria instead, ending in Sidon, Lebanon. Thus it was within US interest to replace the current unruly Syrian regime with a more cooperative government.

According to available sources, local CIA agents and military attaché stationed in Syria acted independently to encourage Colonel Zaim to overthrow President Quwatli, without the formal approval or direct involvement of the US State Department. This was to maintain plausible deniability for the US government.

=== Zaim Regime ===
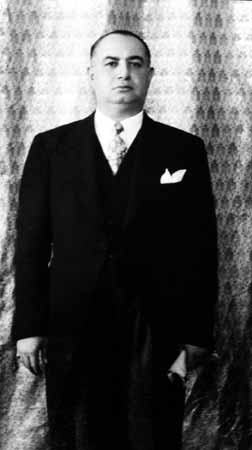
Portrait of President Husni al-Zaim

Following the end of constitutional government in Syria and his subsequent rise to power, President Zaim proved more willing to accommodate the demands of the West. On May 16, the Tapline concession was finally approved, satisfying US interests. Other significant actions of his include signing an armistice with Israel, dropping claims over the Turkish-held Sanjak of Alexandretta (modern day Hatay Province), launching domestic anti-Communist campaigns, and being openly willing to resettle Palestinians in Syria.

In terms of foreign policy, President Zaim improved ties with France in order to secure military assistance and maintained close relations with Saudi Arabia and Egypt, seeking to counter Hashemite ambitions in neighbouring Iraq and Jordan. Ultimately, President Zaim sought regional support to strengthen his rule in Syria. While these efforts painted Zaim as a promising candidate for a stable, Western-backed authoritarian regime, his reign was short-lived. After just 137 days in power, Zaim was overthrown and executed on August 14, 1949.

There are a multitude of reasons for why Zaim's regime lasted as short as it was. Chief among them his fragile domestic powerbase. Through his policies, he made many enemies among much of the traditional Syrian elite, and in Muslim circles. His erratic tendencies, sometimes viewed as bordering on megalomania, deterred potential Western sponsors. Moreover, his controversial decision to assume the title of Marshal offended his fellow officers, further isolating him. Additionally, President Zaim enraged Syrian Social Nationalist Party (SSNP) members by extraditing their party founder, Antun Saadeh, to Lebanese authorities, leading to his execution on July 9. Saadeh advocated for a "Greater Syria" which included Lebanon, and was thus involved in attempts to overthrow the Lebanese President.

What ultimately led to Zaim's downfall however were his plans to mobilize army units to the Jabal Druze region, south of Damascus, and curtail the local autonomy of the Druze tribal leaders. This not only inflamed local tensions but also solidified opposition within the military, including Colonel Sami Hinnawi, commander of the First Brigade, who saw Zaim's campaign as reckless and pointlessly destabilizing.

== Coup Attempt ==
On August 14, a group of dissident military officers led by Colonel Sami al-Hinnawi, who had previously supported President Zaim's rise to power in March 1949, executed a coup d'état. Armed men in three armoured cars surrounded President Zaim's private residence. After a brief exchange of gunfire with his bodyguards, President Zaim was finally captured. Prime Minister Mohsen Barazi was similarly apprehended.

After the arrests, a Higher War Council was formed, comprising Colonel Hinnawi, Colonel Bahij Kallas, and other senior officers. The council swiftly tried both Zaim and Barazi with treason, condemning them to death. Their sentences were immediately carried out at Mezze Prison, near Damascus.

Public broadcast proclamations issued afterwards accused Zaim of misusing public funds, falsifying laws, and restricting the personal freedoms of Syrians. The military justified their actions as a necessary measure to save the country from tyranny, and insisted their assumption of power was merely temporary. Demonstrations were forbidden and government officials were ordered to remain at their posts under threat of dismissal.

== Aftermath ==
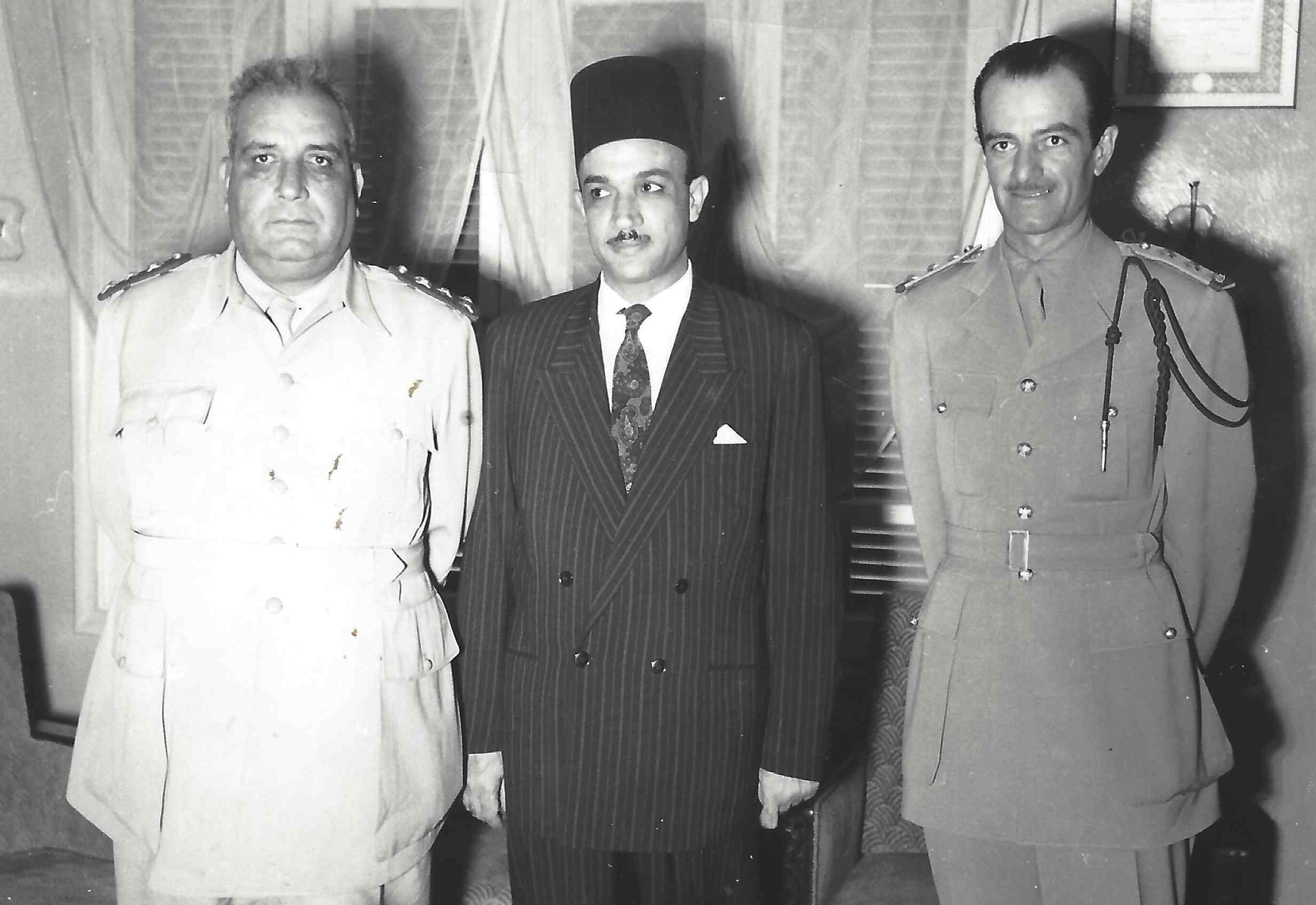
The figure on the far-left is Colonel Sami Hinnawi.

The new military regime, now headed by Colonel Hinnawi, was backed by various factions, including SSNP-aligned officers such as Colonel Adib al-Shishakli, the Arab Socialist Party, the pro-Iraqi and Aleppo-based People's Party (also known as the Popular or Populist Party), and pro-Hashemite Druze leaders. Unlike his predecessor, Colonel Hinnawi pledged to return to constitutional governance, and appointed Hashim al-Atassi, a respected elder statesman, to lead the newly formed civilian government. Staying true to their commitments, the government introduced new electoral laws on September 11, announcing elections were planned to be held in the future.

Elections for the Constituent Assembly were duly held in November 1949, which resulted in a victory for the People's Party. Despite the electoral win though, the parliamentary majority held by the People's Party was still not enough to achieve the political ambitions of President Hinnawi, which was union with Hashemite Iraq - dubbed the Fertile Crescent plan. In early December 1949, President Hinnawi publicly endorsed the idea of a political union with Hashemite Iraq, making it official government policy. As a result, Colonel Adib Shishakli and like-minded officers began organizing efforts to remove Hinnawi from power.

== December Coup ==
In the early hours of December 19, troops mobilized and advanced towards Damascus, planning to arrest President Hinnawi. By 6 AM, the coup attempt had been decisively executed, resulting in the capture of Hinnawi and his key allies. In the aftermath, Colonel Shishakli assumed leadership of the country.

With Colonel Shishakli's rise to power, any hope of realizing the Fertile Crescent scheme and uniting with Iraq were swiftly crushed, as he firmly pledged to preserving Syrian independence.

== Bibliography ==
- Carleton, Alford (1950). "The Syrian Coups D'État of 1949". Middle East Journal. 4 (1): 1–11. ISSN 0026-3141. JSTOR 4322135.
- Drewry, James C., Jr. (1960). An Analysis of the 1949 coup d'état in Syria in the Light of Fertile Crescent Unity (Thesis). American University of Beirut.
- Dostal, Jörg. "Syria and the Great Powers (1946-1958): How Western Power Politics Pushed the Country Toward the Soviet Union" (PDF). Academic Paper. Seoul National University.
- Münnich, Maciej. "Syria Past And Present". Teka Kom. Politol. Stos. Międzynar. 12 (1): 7–25.
- Rihan, Carl (2025). Coup in Damascus: Syria and the birth of Arab military rule, 1949. Manchester University Press. doi:10.7765/9781526151056.
- Whitman, Elizabeth (2011). The Awakening of the Syrian Army: General Husni al-Za'im's Coup and Reign, 1949 (Phd Thesis). Columbia University. doi:10.7916/D82Z1CHZ. S2CID 154180574.
