= Arwa Damon =

American journalist

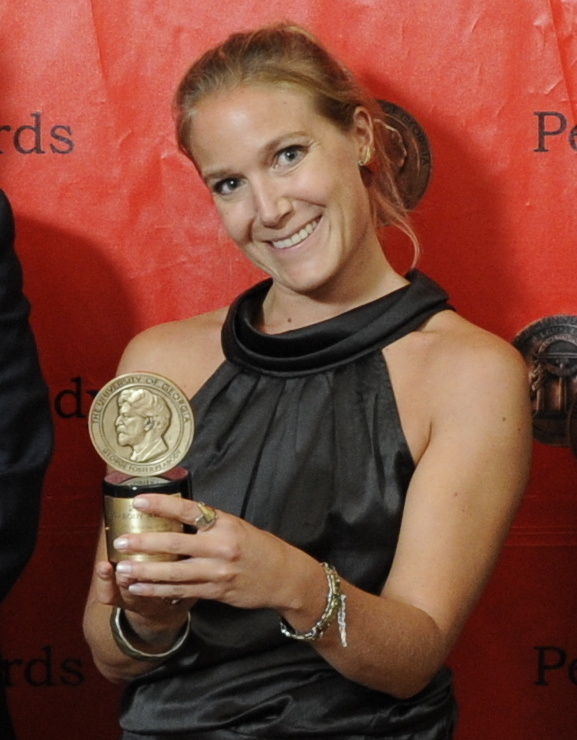
- Damon in May 2012
- Born: September 19, 1977 (age 49); Boston, Massachusetts, U.S.
- Education: Skidmore College (BA)
- Occupation: Journalist
- Relatives: Muhsin al-Barazi (grandfather); Azad Al-Barazi (cousin)

Arwa Damon (born September 19, 1977) is a Syrian American journalist who was most recently a senior international correspondent for CNN, based in Istanbul. From 2003, she covered the Middle East as a freelance journalist, before joining CNN in 2006. She is also president and founder of INARA, a humanitarian organization that provides medical treatment to refugee children from Syria. She left CNN in June 2022 to focus on her humanitarian work.

== Early life ==
Damon was born in Boston on September 19, 1977 to an American father and Syrian Kurdish mother. She spent her early childhood years in Wayland, Massachusetts. Damon is the granddaughter of Muhsin al-Barazi, the former Prime Minister of Syria, who was executed in the August 1949 Syrian coup d'état.

At the age of six, Damon and her family moved to Morocco, followed by Istanbul, Turkey three years later, where her father was a teacher and middle school director at Robert College.

Damon skipped sixth grade and graduated with honors from Robert College at the age of 16. She then spent a gap year with her aunt and uncle in Morocco, learning show jumping, before moving to the U.S. to attend Skidmore College in Saratoga Springs, New York. She graduated with honors in 1999 with a major in French and a minor in international affairs.

Before becoming a reporter, Damon sold bathrobes and towels for an online textile company.

== Journalism career ==
=== CameraPlanet ===
Damon decided to become a journalist after 9/11, and moved to Baghdad prior to the beginning of the Iraq War. She began her career at CameraPlanet, a supplier of media content for television newscasts. In 2004, she worked as a freelancer at CNN's Baghdad bureau, joining the network as a correspondent in 2006.

=== CNN/CNN International ===
Damon covered the Iraqi elections of January 2005, the constitutional referendum vote in October 2005, and the Iraqi election of December 2005. She also reported on the trials and executions of Saddam Hussein, Barzan Ibrahim Hassan al-Tikriti and Awad Hamed al-Bandar in January 2007.

During the Syrian civil war, Damon travelled multiple times to Syria and to refugee camps for Syrians. After the 2012 Benghazi attack, she was one of the first journalists to arrive at the scene; she recovered slain Ambassador J. Christopher Stevens' personal diary.

In 2013, Damon followed an anti-poaching park ranger unit through Odzala National Park in the Republic of the Congo. The feature was called Arwa Damon Investigates: Ivory War.

In April 2014, after the Chibok schoolgirls kidnapping, she travelled to West Africa and the islands of Lake Chad to follow the hunt for the terrorists.

Damon covered the International military intervention against ISIL on numerous occasions, dating to the beginning of the conflict.

Damon returned to Iraq in the second half of 2016 and covered the Battle of Mosul. Riding with a convoy consisting of press and Iraqi soldiers, she came under heavy fire by IS troops and was trapped. After 28 hours of entrenched fighting, reinforcements from the Iraqi military rescued them.

Damon travelled to Thailand to cover the Tham Luang cave rescue. In 2018, she accompanied a Greenpeace group to Antarctica and made a feature on it.

In 2019, Damon travelled to Kathmandu in Nepal to report on a spike in fatalities amongst Mount Everest climbers. That year, she traveled again with Greenpeace, this time to the Arctic. She reported about the significant loss of ice at the poles and their importance for the whole ecosystem of the earth.

She announced her departure from CNN in June 2022 to focus on her humanitarian work.

== Personal life ==
Damon is fluent in Arabic, French and Turkish. She lives in Istanbul with her three pet cats.

In August 2014, Damon and CNN were sued by two employees of the U.S. Embassy in Baghdad, who said that on July 19, 2014, an intoxicated Damon had bitten them. Damon acknowledged the incident and apologized.

== Charitable work ==
INARA (the International Network for Aid, Relief and Assistance) is a humanitarian aid, 501(c)(3), non-profit organization that was co-founded by Arwa Damon in 2015 in Beirut, Lebanon. INARA provides medical services for children who have been wounded in war zones. It also provides rehabilitation treatment for its beneficiaries. The organization focuses on refugee children from Syria.

During the Gaza war, Damon entered the Gaza Strip four times to lead charity work.

== Awards and honors ==
Damon won an Investigative Reporters and Editors' IRE Award for her reporting of the Consulate attack in Benghazi, along with fellow photojournalist Sarmad Qaseera.

Damon was part of the CNN team who won the 2012 Emmy Award for Outstanding Live Coverage of a Current News Story – Long Form (Revolution in Egypt: President Mubarak Steps Down). In 2014, she was awarded the Courage in Journalism Award given by the International Women's Media Foundation (IWMF).
