= Syrian War =

Syrian War may refer to:

- Syrian Wars, a series of six wars between 274 BC and 168 BC opposing the Seleucid and Ptolemaic kingdoms
- Roman–Seleucid War (192–188 BC), also known as the Antiochene War
- Egyptian–Ottoman War (1831–1833), also known as the First Syrian War
- Egyptian–Ottoman War (1839–1841), also known as the Second Syrian War
- Franco-Syrian War (1920)
- Syria–Lebanon Campaign (1941)
- Syrian civil war (2011–2024)
- Aftermath of the Syrian civil war (2024–present)

== See also ==
- List of wars involving Syria
- Syrian revolution (disambiguation)
- Syrian coup d'état (disambiguation)
