= Fertile Crescent Plan =

Proposed state

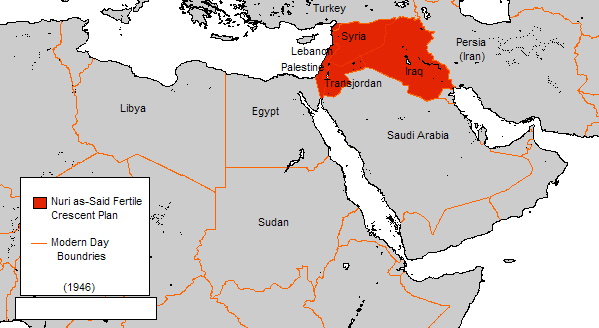
Nuri's proposed state

The Fertile Crescent Plan was a series of proposals made by Iraqi politicians from the 1920s to 1950s for an Arab federation of the Kingdom of Iraq with Mandatory Syria (including Mandatory Lebanon), Mandatory Palestine, and Transjordan. The plans were presented as a solution to the Arab-Zionist conflict by finding a middle ground between Pan-Arabism and Zionism, because the proposed state would allow for Jewish immigration with either a Jewish national home or a Jewish state as a part of the federation. While pan-Arab solutions to the conflict with the Zionists began as early as 1919, in the 1930s and 1940s several Iraqi statesmen, such as King Faisal I and Nuri as-Said, presented numerous offers for a pan-Arab state. Though some Syrian, Palestinian, British and Zionist officials were willing to entertain the idea, ultimately the opposition from the aforementioned groups as well as the French prevented its creation. In the end, the Arab federation - consisting of Jordan with the West Bank of Palestine and Iraq - only lasted for a couple of months in 1958.

== Historical background ==
From 1915 to 1916, several letters were exchanged between the British official Henry McMahon and Sherif Hussein, the father of King Faisal I and King Abdullah I. During the McMahon–Hussein correspondence, United Kingdom agreed in principle to recognize Arab independence after the war in return for the Arab Revolt. In 1917, the British government issued the Balfour Declaration, expressing its support for the establishment of a Jewish national home in Palestine. These two wartime commitments, one to the Arab national movement and one to the Zionist movement, created competing expectations over the future of Palestine. The Sykes–Picot Agreement, under which Britain and France secretly agreed to divide much of the Ottoman Arab provinces into spheres of influence, further complicated the situation by assigning Syria and Lebanon to France while excluding Palestine from the territory discussed with Hussein.

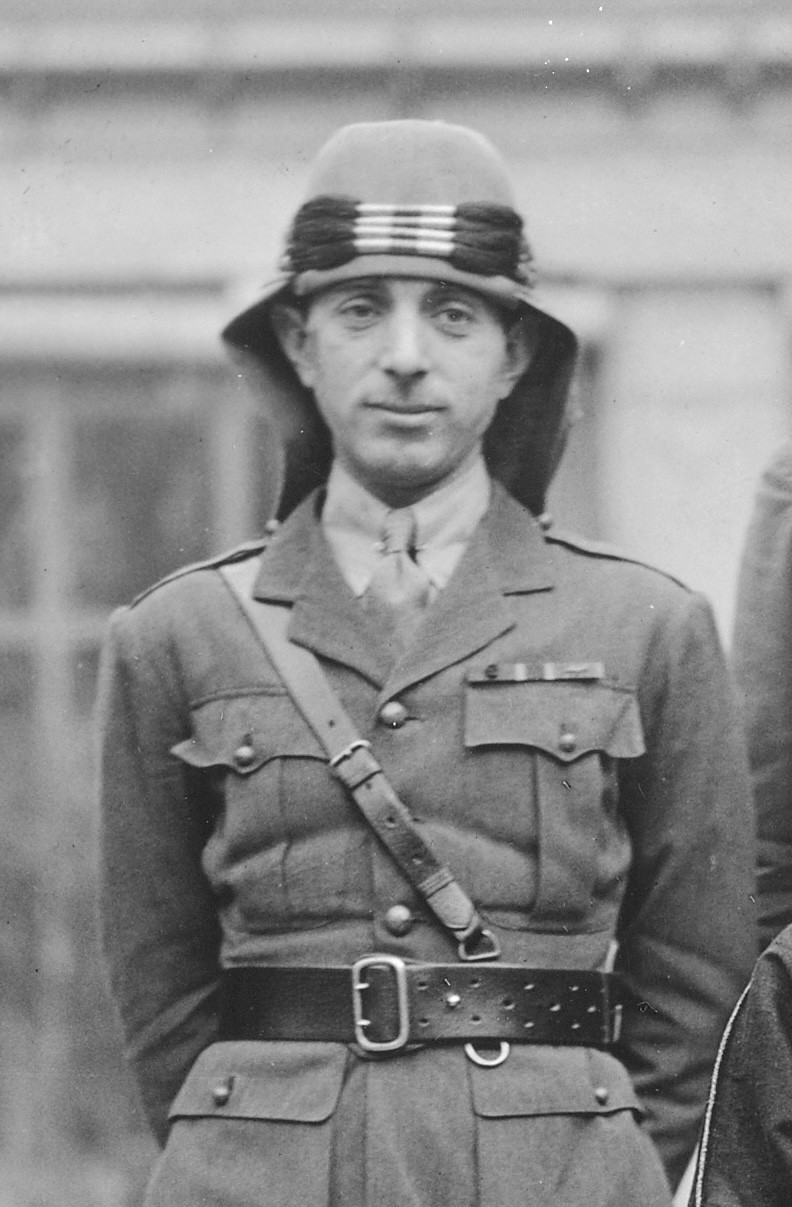
Nuri as-Said at the Versailles Conference

In 1918, Faisal met Chaim Weizmann, a Zionist leader and future first president of Israel. In the Faisal–Weizmann agreement, Faisal accepted the establishment of a Jewish national home in Palestine, together with continued Jewish immigration and settlement, but not an independent Jewish state. The agreement was explicitly contingent upon Arab independence and the protection of the civil and religious rights of the Palestinian Arab population. The failure of Faisal's Arab Kingdom of Syria, following its defeat by the French in the Franco-Syrian War, rendered the agreement void. Faisal subsequently became king of Iraq, while his brother Abdullah became emir of Transjordan. Although Transjordan remained formally part of the Mandate for Palestine, it was administered separately and excluded from the provisions concerning the Jewish national home. Throughout the interwar period, the Hashemite brothers continued to advocate for a wider Arab state under their rule, typically including Palestine, Jordan and Iraq.

In 1929, following the riots in Palestine, Faisal outlined three possible solutions to the Palestine question:

- The unification of Palestine with Iraq and Syria as a "national homeland for the Semite race, both Arabs and Jews". This was his preferred solution, though he acknowledged that it would also be the most difficult to achieve.
- The unification of Palestine with Transjordan.
- An independent Palestinian state under treaty relations with Britain, ensuring British supervision of the holy places while limiting Jewish immigration according to Palestine's "economic absorptive capacity" so as to prevent the emergence of a Jewish majority.

Though Britain was not willing to abandon their control of Palestine, Faisal was not deterred. On 3 October 1932, Iraq became the first Arab country admitted to the League of Nations. During Iraq's admission speech, delegate Tawfiq al-Suwaydi raised the issue of Palestine and called for its independence, reflecting the growing importance of the Palestinian question in Iraqi politics. Palestine increasingly became a rallying point for Iraqi Arab nationalists, who viewed its future as inseparable from wider questions of Arab unity. During a visit to London in 1933, Nuri al-Sa'id, then serving as foreign minister, argued that incorporation into a larger Arab state would remove Palestinian Arab fears of Jewish immigration, as the overall Arab majority would remain secure. Nuri also attempted to arrange another meeting between Faisal and Weizmann in hopes of reviving negotiations, but nothing came of the effort. Faisal died later that year. Following Faisal's death, Nuri increasingly promoted a similar vision of a Hashemite-led Arab federation. In late 1935, he privately proposed to the British ambassador the formation of a federation between Iraq and Transjordan, which British officials understood as the first stage of a wider Arab confederation that would eventually include Syria once French rule came to an end.

== Attempts during the Arab revolt (1936-1939) ==
In 1936, the Arab revolt in Palestine broke out, prompting several attempts by Arab leaders outside Palestine to mediate between the Palestinian Arabs, the Zionist movement, and the British authorities. During a visit to London in June 1936, Nuri met Weizmann and proposed resolving the conflict by incorporating Palestine into a federation with Iraq and Transjordan under the Hashemite monarchy. Under the proposal, the Zionist movement would temporarily suspend Jewish immigration during the work of the Peel Commission and accept permanent minority status within a larger Arab federation, in return for guarantees for the Jewish national home. Weizmann's response was noncommittal. Although Nuri later claimed that an agreement had been reached to suspend immigration, Weizmann publicly denied ever making such a commitment.

On 29 October 1936, the 1936 Iraqi coup d'état overthrew the Iraqi government. The new government was led by Hikmat Sulayman. On 8 February 1937, he proposed a deal to a British official, C. J. Edmonds, for a loose federation of Iraq, Jordan and Palestine. This was similar to Nuri's 1936 vision, but with the difference of unlimited Jewish immigration, even up to one million. However, this was raised as his private view; it was not an official offer from the Iraqi government and remains unknown whether or not it was ever raised in the cabinet. Following the coup, Nuri fled and went into exile in Cairo, but continued to promote Arab federation as a solution to the Palestine question. During the autumn of 1937, alongside the Syrian nationalist Abdul Rahman Shahbandar, he advanced a revised proposal for an Arab confederation in which the Jews would remain a protected minority in Palestine which could absorb up to three million Jewish refugees who could settle within the member states of the federation. Unlike Shahbandar, who was willing to accept a Jewish population of up to 36 percent in Palestine, Nuri insisted on preserving the existing demographic balance by limiting Jewish immigration into Palestine itself, roughly 28.5%. Working through British, French and Palestinian intermediaries in Beirut, Nuri urged Palestinian leaders to cooperate with the Woodhead Commission and negotiate directly with the Zionist movement in order to avert the partition of Palestine. However, Nuri and Shahbandar failed to gain the support of either the Zionist leadership under Weizmann or the principal Palestinian factions. Following a meeting with Judah L. Magnes in February 1938, Nuri abandoned this attempt.

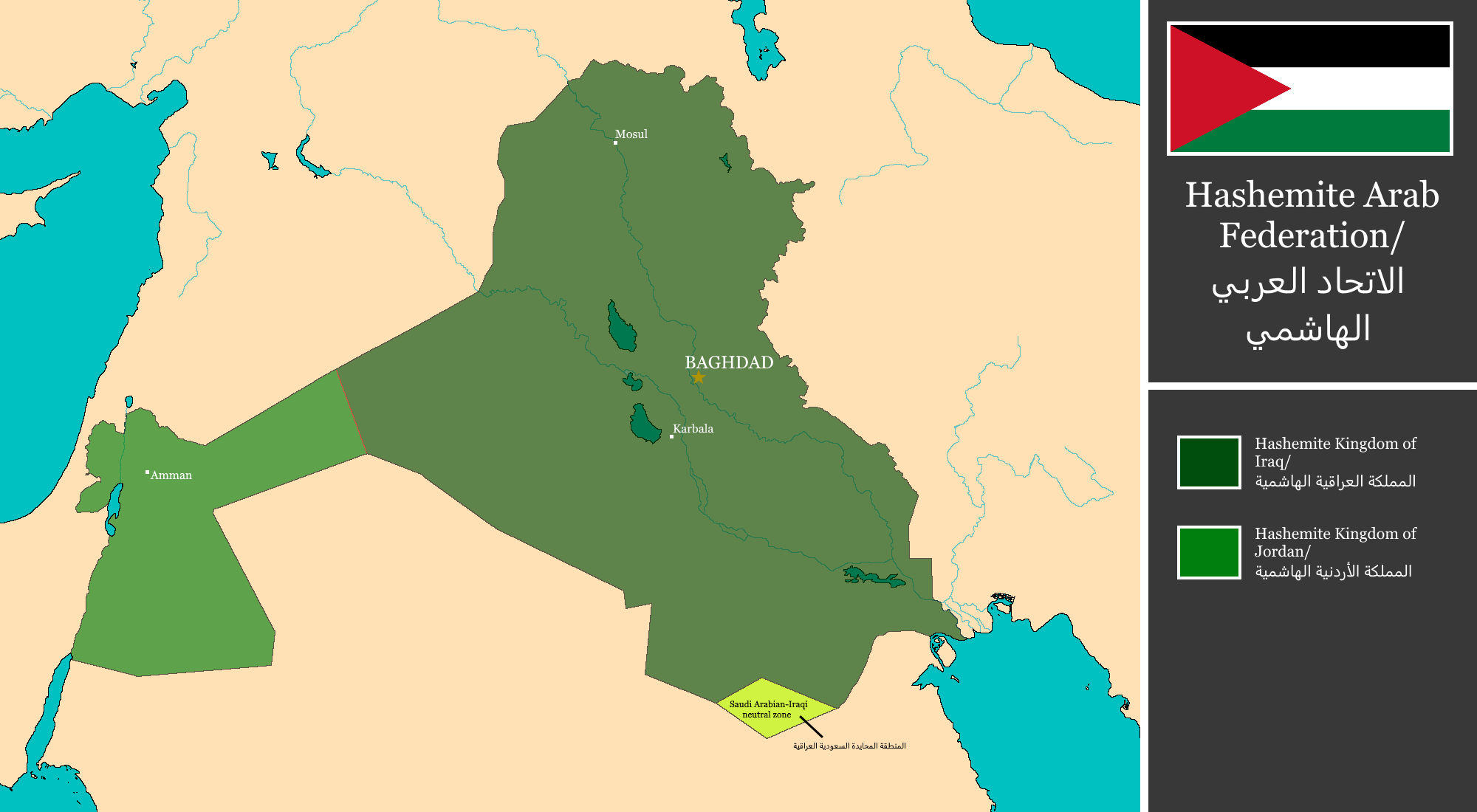
Map of the Arab Federation in 1958, similar in territory to what Nuri Said proposed twenty years prior.

During his exile, Nuri expanded the scope of his federation proposal beyond Iraq, Transjordan and Palestine, seeking to include Syria, Lebanon and Saudi Arabia. He established contacts with Syrian politicians and sought the support of Ibn Saud, whom he proposed as sovereign of the confederation, with Shukri al-Quwatli serving as viceroy in Syria. This was due to his estrangement from King Ghazi, whom he suspected was involved in the Bakr Sidqi coup that had forced him from power. After the failure to secure Saudi support, Nuri modified his position in August 1938 by expressing willingness to accept the partition of Palestine, provided that the Arab portion of Palestine and Transjordan were united with Iraq and, if possible, Syria. He later presented an expanded version of the proposal at the Arab Inter-Parliamentary Conference on Palestine in October 1938, envisioning eventual unity between Syria and Iraq with an independent Palestinian state including Transjordan. The scheme failed to win the support of the Syrian delegates or the Palestinian leader Izzat Darwaza.

Nuri returned as prime minister in December 1938, restoring his ability to pursue his Arab unity initiatives through the Iraqi government. As France delayed ratification of the Franco-Syrian Treaty, the Iraqi government intensified its interest in Syrian affairs and pressed Britain to encourage France to honor the treaty. Nuri proposed that the Syrian parliament declare union with Iraq and send congratulations to King Ghazi on his birthday when it reconvened in March 1939, but Syrian politicians were unwilling to take such a provocative step against France. Nevertheless, several prominent Syrian politicians, such as Saadallah al-Jabiri in Aleppo, expressed support for closer union between Syria and Iraq as part of a wider Arab unity project. At the same time, Nuri continued to advocate Arab federation during the St. James's Conference as a solution to the Palestine question, but the British government remained unwilling to support the scheme, partly because of concerns over relations with Ibn Saud.

The death of King Ghazi in April 1939 and the appointment of Abd al-Ilah as regent strengthened Nuri's position within Iraq and renewed his close association with the Hashemite dynasty. However, the succession crisis also caused divisions within the Hashemite family over the future of Arab unity. The Emir Abdullah of Transjordan regarded himself as the rightful heir to the Hashemite claim to Syria and opposed Nuri's attempts to incorporate Syria and Palestine into a federation dominated by Iraq. Abdullah remained suspicious of Nuri and rejected proposals that would weaken his own claim to leadership in Syria, although he continued to support the broader goal of Arab unity under Hashemite auspices. Thereafter, Nuri continued to promote closer cooperation between Iraq and Transjordan while seeking the eventual incorporation of Syria and Palestine into a wider Arab federation.

== Wartime proposals and the Arab League (1941–1945) ==
Following the Allied victory at the Second Battle of El Alamein and growing expectations that the postwar settlement would determine the future political order of the Middle East, Nuri al-Sa'id renewed his efforts to promote Arab federation. Towards the end of 1942 he prepared a personal memorandum, circulated in early 1943 among British officials, Arab politicians and foreign governments, which represented his most comprehensive statement of Arab unity and proposed a solution to both Arab political fragmentation and the Palestine question. In the conclusion, he argued that:

In my view the only fair solution, and indeed the only hope of securing permanent peace, contentment and progress in these Arab areas is for the United Nations to declare now:—

(1) That Syria, Lebanon, Palestine and Trans-Jordan shall be reunited into one State.

(2) That the form of government of this State, whether monarchical or republican whether unitary or federal, shall be decided by the peoples of this State themselves.

(3) That there shall be created an Arab League to which Iraq and Syria will adhere at once and which can be joined by the other Arab States at will.

(4) That this Arab League shall have a permanent Council nominated by the member States, and presided over by one of the rulers of the States who shall be chosen in a manner acceptable to the States concerned.

(5) The Arab League Council shall be responsible for the following: —

a) Defence.

b) Foreign Affairs.

c) Currency.

d) Communications.

e) Customs.

f) Protection of Minority rights.

(6) The Jews in Palestine shall be given semi-autonomy. They shall have the right to their own rural and urban district administration including schools, health institutes, and police subject to general supervision by the Syrian State.

(7) Jerusalem shall be a city to which members of all religions shall have free access for pilgrimage and worship. A special commission composed of representatives of the three theocratic religions shall be set up to ensure this.

(8) That if they demand it, the Maronites in the Lebanon shall be granted a privileged regime such as they possessed during the last years of the Ottoman Empire. This special regime like those to be set up in paragraphs 6 and 7 above shall rest on an International Guarantee.

Nuri sought support for the proposal from Britain, Egypt, Saudi Arabia and other Arab governments, but encountered significant opposition. Although Nuri repeatedly assured Saudi and British officials that Iraq had no dynastic ambitions in Syria and that the Syrians themselves would determine their future government, private discussions revealed that he hoped to place Abd al-Ilah on the Syrian throne and strengthen the Iraqi branch of the Hashemite dynasty, which reinforced Saudi and Syrian suspicions of the project. Abdullah rejected Nuri's initiative, arguing that Iraq had no right to speak on behalf of the Syrian states, while Syrian nationalists opposed Iraqi or Jordanian claims and emphasized their own independence. Ibn Saud likewise feared that the scheme would expand Hashemite influence at Saudi Arabia's expense despite Nuri's assurances that Iraq had no dynastic ambitions in Syria. Nuri later suggested that Saudi Arabia should stand alongside Iraq and united Syria as one of the three founding members of the proposed Arab federation, but Ibn Saud remained opposed.

In 1943 Nuri attempted to secure Egyptian support by engaging with Egyptian Prime Minister Mustafa el-Nahhas, who was skeptical of Nuri's plans. During the Nuri–Nahhas discussions, which began in July 1943, the two men agreed that an immediate centralized Arab union with a single government was impractical because of internal disagreements and external obstacles. Nuri outlined two possible forms of Arab cooperation: a stronger federation with executive authority, proportional representation, and binding decisions, or a looser association in which decisions would not be compulsory and member states would have equal representation. Nuri personally favored the stronger model, but accepted that the preferences of other Arab states would have to be considered. Nuri continued to argue that the creation of Greater Syria should be the first step toward wider Arab federation, while Nahhas avoided endorsing a specific scheme. Although Nahhas accepted that Syria, Lebanon, Palestine and Transjordan could unite if their inhabitants wished, he did not commit Egypt to supporting a Hashemite-led Greater Syria. Nuri, meanwhile, continued to stress that Iraq and the Greater Syria states represented the core of any future federation and sought Egyptian support partly to overcome Saudi opposition. When Nuri later accepted Syrian republicanism, King Abdullah viewed it as a betrayal. Still, Syrian nationalists remained concerned about Iraqi and Hashemite ambitions, Ibn Saud opposed any arrangement that could strengthen Hashemite influence, and Egypt sought to place Arab cooperation within a broader and looser union rather than one centered on Iraq and the Levant. Ultimately, Arab unity efforts shifted away from Nuri's Fertile Crescent federation instead to the creation of the Arab League in 1945.

== Final efforts ==
After the collapse of French rule in Syria, some Syrian politicians—like members of the People's Party—viewed a Fertile Crescent union as a possible means of strengthening Syria against domestic instability and external pressures. However, enthusiasm for Iraqi-led union was still limited by suspicion of Hashemite ambitions, British influence, and Iraqi attempts to shape Syrian politics. After the coup of Adib al-Shishakli, Baghdad provided financial assistance, cultivated Syrian politicians, and even established a "Free Syrian Government" in exile. However, Syrian nationalists were able to successfully resist Iraqi pressure. By 1958, both Iraq and Syria were in rival pan-Arab states, the Arab Federation and United Arab Republic respectively.

== See also ==
- Arab Federation
- Arab Kingdom of Syria
- Fertile Crescent
- Syria (region)
- Syrian Social Nationalist Party
- Damascus Protocol
- Sykes–Picot Agreement
- Pan-Arabism

== Bibliography ==
- Al-Maani, Abd-Al; Al-Shuqairat, Hussein (2025). "A Study of the Jordanian and Iraqi Positions on Arab Unity Projects: "Greater Syria Project 1939 and Fertile Crescent Project 1942 as Case Studies"". International Journal of History Research. 5 (1): 1–13. doi:10.47604/ijhr.3217. ISSN 2959-4499.
- Balfour-Paul, H. G. (2021). "Iraq: The Fertile Crescent Dimension". In Niblock, Tim (ed.). Iraq: The Contemporary State. Routledge. doi:10.4324/97810003252719-2.
- Caplan, Neil (2015) [1986]. Futile Diplomacy: Arab-Zionist Negotiations and the End of the Mandate. Vol. 2. Routledge.
- Commins, David Dean. Historical Dictionary of Syria, p. 105. Scarecrow Press, 2004, ISBN 0-8108-4934-8.
- Eppel, Michael (1994). The Palestine Conflict in the History of Modern Iraq: The Dynamics of Involvement 1928-1948. Frank Cass.
- ——————— (1992). "Iraqi politics and regional policies, 1945–49". Middle Eastern Studies. 28 (1): 108–119. doi:10.1080/00263209208700892. ISSN 0026-3206.
- ——————— (1988). "The Hikmat Sulayman‐Bakir Sidqi government in Iraq, 1936–37, and the Palestine question". Middle Eastern Studies. 24 (1): 25–41. doi:10.1080/00263208808700727. JSTOR 4283220.
- Gomaa, Ahmed M. (1977). The Foundation of the League of Arab States: Wartime Diplomacy and Inter-Arab Politics 1941 to 1945. Longman Group.
- Husry, Khaldun S. (1975). "King Faysal I and Arab Unity, 1930-33". Journal of Contemporary History. 10 (2): 323–340. doi:10.1177/002200947501000206. ISSN 0022-0094. JSTOR 260150.
- Khadduri, Majid (1951). "The Scheme of Fertile Crescent Unity: A Study in Inter-Arab Relations". In Bunche, Ralph; Frye, Richard Nelson (eds.). The Near East and the Great Powers. Harvard University Press. doi:10.4159/harvard.9780674367326.c22.
- Maddy-Weitzman, Bruce (1990). "Jordan and Iraq: Efforts at Intra-Hashimite Unity". Middle Eastern Studies. 26 (1): 65–75. doi:10.1080/00263209008700805. JSTOR 4283349.
- Masalha, Nur (1991). "Faisal's Pan‐Arabism, 1921–33". Middle Eastern Studies. 27 (4): 679–693. doi:10.1080/00263209108700885. ISSN 0026-3206. JSTOR 4283470.
- Mufti, Malik (1996). Sovereign Creations: Pan-Arabism and Political Order in Syria and Iraq. Cornell University Press.
- Porath, Yehoshua (1986). In Search of Arab Unity 1930-1945. Frank Cass.
- ———————— (April 1984). "Abdallah's Greater Syria Programme". Middle Eastern Studies. 20 (2): 172–189. doi:10.1080/00263208408700579. JSTOR 4282995.
- ———————— (October 1984). "Nuri al‐Sa'id's Arab unity programme". Middle Eastern Studies. 20 (4): 76–98. doi:10.1080/00263208408700600. JSTOR 4283031.
- ———————— (1984). "Weizmann, Churchill and the "Philby Plan, 1937–1943". Studies in Zionism. 5 (2): 239–272. doi:10.1080/13531048408575865. ISSN 0334-1771.
- Rolef, Susan Hattis (1972). "The Zionists and St. John Philby". Jewish Social Studies. 34 (2): 107–121. ISSN 0021-6704. JSTOR 4466701.
- Rubin, Barry (1981). The Arab States and the Palestine Conflict. Syracuse University Press.
- Seale, Patrick (1965). The Struggle for Syria: A Study of Post-war Arab Politics, 1945-1958. Oxford University Press.
- Shikārah, Aḥmad ʻAbd al-Razzāq (1987). Iraqi Politics, 1921-41: The Interaction Between Domestic Politics and Foreign Policy. LAAM.
- Simon, Reeva S. (1974). "The Hashemite 'Conspiracy': Hashemite Unity Attempts, 1921–1958". International Journal of Middle East Studies. 5 (3): 314–327. doi:10.1017/S0020743800034966. JSTOR 162381.
