= March 1949 Syrian coup d'état =

Bloodless coup that overthrew Shukri al-Quwatli

- Part of the Cold War
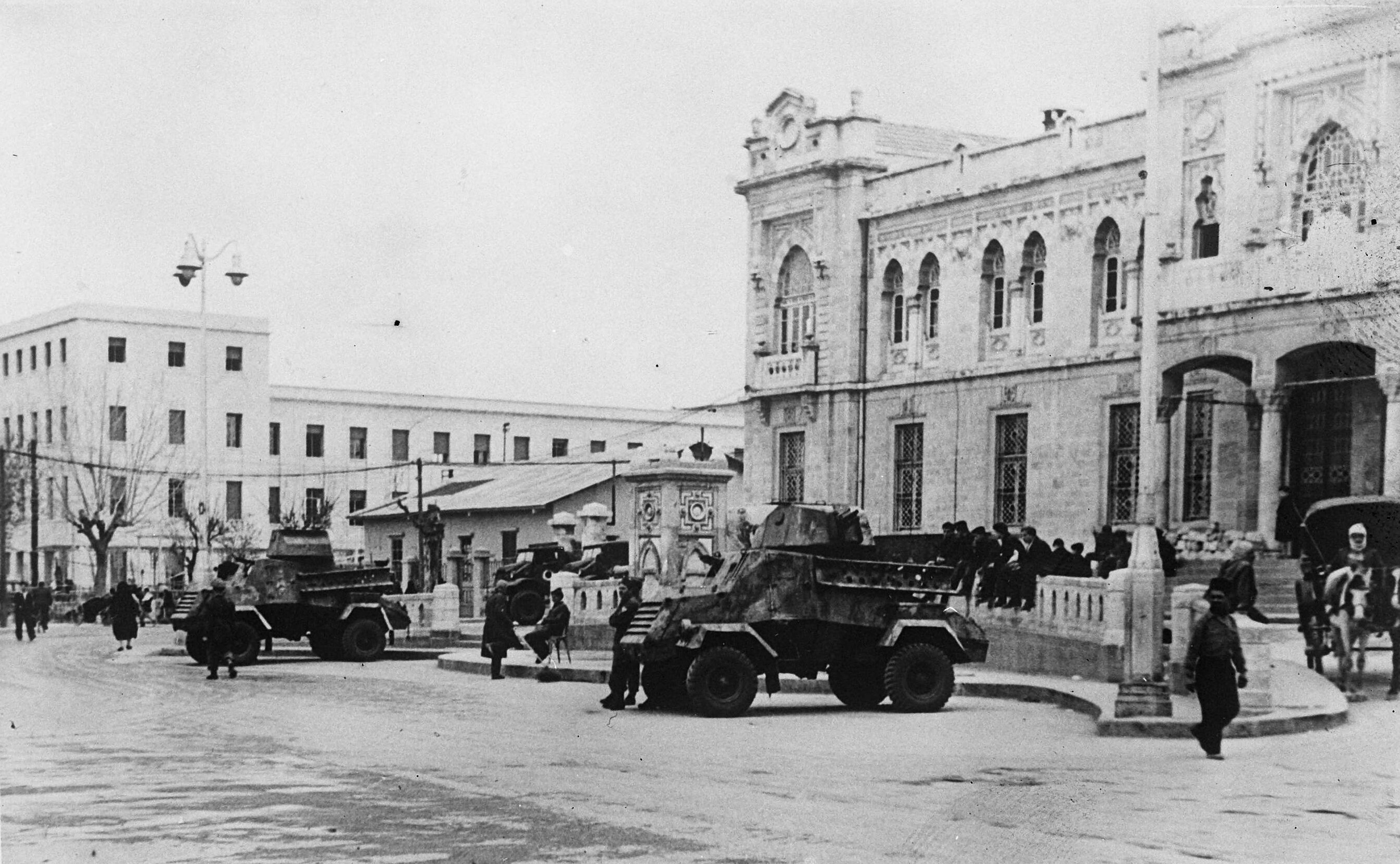
- Armored vehicles and soldiers in Damascus after the coup
Date	29–30 March 1949 (2:30 a.m.)
Location	Syria
Result	Overthrow of Shukri al-Quwatli

Belligerents
Syrian government: National Party	Syrian Armed Forces coup plotters Syrian Social Nationalist Party; United States (alleged): CIA

Commanders and leaders
Shukri al-Quwatli (President of Syria)	Husni al-Za'im (Army chief of staff); Adib Shishakli; Sami al-Hinnawi; Miles Copeland Jr. (alleged); Stephen Meade (alleged)

Casualties and losses
Three bodyguards	None

The March 1949 Syrian coup d'état was a bloodless coup d'état that took place on 30 March. It was the first military coup in modern Syrian history and overthrew the country's democratically elected government, after Syria gained independence in 1943. It was led by the Syrian Army chief of staff, Husni al-Za'im, who became president of Syria on 11 April 1949. Syrian President Shukri al-Quwatli, who was overthrown as a result of the coup, was accused of poor leadership and purchasing inferior arms for the Syrian Army. He was briefly imprisoned, but then released into exile in Egypt.

Many of the internal motivations behind the coup subsequently stemmed from dissatisfaction among the Syrian people and military because of al-Quwatli's leadership during the 1948 Arab-Israeli Conflict. Transnational corporate agendas in lieu of the commission of the Trans-Arabian Pipeline, such as that of ARAMCO and Saudi King Ibn Saud are speculated to have informed alleged US involvement in the coup. Among the officers who assisted al-Za'im's takeover were Sami al-Hinnawi and Adib al-Shishakli, both of whom in sequence would later also become military leaders of the country. Syria's legislature, then called the House of Representatives, was dissolved, and al-Za'im imprisoned many political leaders on the basis of various accusations.

== Background ==
As recounted by the British military attaché in Syria, Husni al-Za'im began plotting a coup two years in advance in March 1947. On March 29, 1949, Za'im provided four of his senior officers with instructions outlining their roles in the coup; the officers were told to wait until midnight to view the instructions, and to do so in complete privacy. The coup commenced at 2:30 a.m. on March 30 and proved to be "a masterpiece of military planning, bloodless apart from the deaths of three bodyguards attached to a government minister." Quwatli, ill with "a gastric ulcer and heart complaint," was arrested in hospital by one of six military units that ferreted through Damascus and systematically captured key government buildings. The Syrian national anthem and a message from Za'im announcing the change in government began playing over the radio near dawn.

== American involvement in the coup d'état ==
There are "highly controversial" allegations that the American legation in Syria, headed by James Hugh Keeley, Jr., and the Central Intelligence Agency (CIA) engineered the coup. Allegations and documentation of American involvement in the coup are underscored by the correspondence between Colonel Za'im and Western organizations such as the Central Intelligence Agency (CIA) preceding the coup. Formally an undercover Assistant Military attaché, undercover CIA operative Stephen J. Meade became intimately acquainted with Colonel Za'im several weeks prior to the coup. Meade was considered Za'im's "principal Western confidant" during Za'im's brief time in power, and alongside Miles Copeland Jr. (CIA Damascus Station Chief) had been described as playing a key role in orchestrating the coup. Available evidence, however, suggests that Za'im was in little need of prodding from the Americans. Per the British military attaché, Za'im had been contemplating a coup since March 1947, over a year before he was introduced to Meade on November 30, 1948.

Copeland later authored several books with "extraordinarily detailed accounts of CIA operations in, among other countries, Syria, Egypt, and Iran" that are considered "one of the most revelatory set of writings by a former U.S. intelligence officer ever published." However, Copeland's memoirs have a strong literary quality and contain many embellishments, which make it difficult to gauge the historical accuracy of the events that he describes. Moreover, Copeland's account of the Syrian coup in his 1989 autobiography The Game Player: Confessions of the CIA's Original Political Operative contradicts the earlier version presented in his 1969 The Game of Nations: The Amorality of Power Politics.

American intervention in Syrian politics had begun before the coup; in July 1947, as Copeland described attempting to eliminate "corruption and intimidation" in Syrian elections. Copeland also disclosed that many officials in Washington viewed Syria as a "pilot project" to determine the extent to which America could influence Middle Eastern governments and elections, as Syria was the first former colony in the Middle East to gain complete political independence from European colonial powers. In The Game of Nations, Copeland suggested that Syria, as the first former colony in the Arab world to achieve complete political independence from Europe, was perceived in Washington as a test case for America's "capacity for exerting a democratizing influence on Arab countries." According to Copeland, the CIA attempted to "police" the July 1947 Syrian national elections, which were marred by fraud, sectarianism, and interference by neighboring Iraq and Transjordan.

== Geopolitical context and the Arab-Israeli Conflict ==
Quwatli's government and leadership perceivably jeopardized the stability of Syria, raising concerns among U.S. officials such as James Hugh Keeley Jr., a U.S. diplomat and envoy to the Syrian government, that Syria was "on the verge of complete collapse," which could have empowered the Syrian Communist Party or other "radicals" (such as the Ba'ath Party and the Muslim Brotherhood). Concerns were especially fueled by Syria's wartime performance and provocative conduct during the 1948 Arab-Israeli War under Quwatli's leadership. During the 1948 War, Quwatli's term has been described by scholars as a "disaster for both his presidency and democracy in Syria." The 1947 UN Resolution 181 that proposed a partition of Palestine into two states, often characterized as the catalyst for outrage in the Middle East over Western solidarity with Israel, had a profound effect on the fledging democracy that Syria was under Quwatli. After the UN declaration in 1947 that Palestine should be split into two parts, mass protests and civil unrest broke out across Syria, urging for Syrian intervention alongside the Arab League in Palestine. Syria is identified by some sources as being "the whip" that drove others in the Arab League to going to war with Israel, despite the speculation that Quwatli was fully aware of the inadequacy of Syria's military capabilities to contribute to a war effort as such. Under consideration of the outrage from his constituents, some argue that Quwatli had little choice in his perceivably overzealous directive to push for war in 1948.

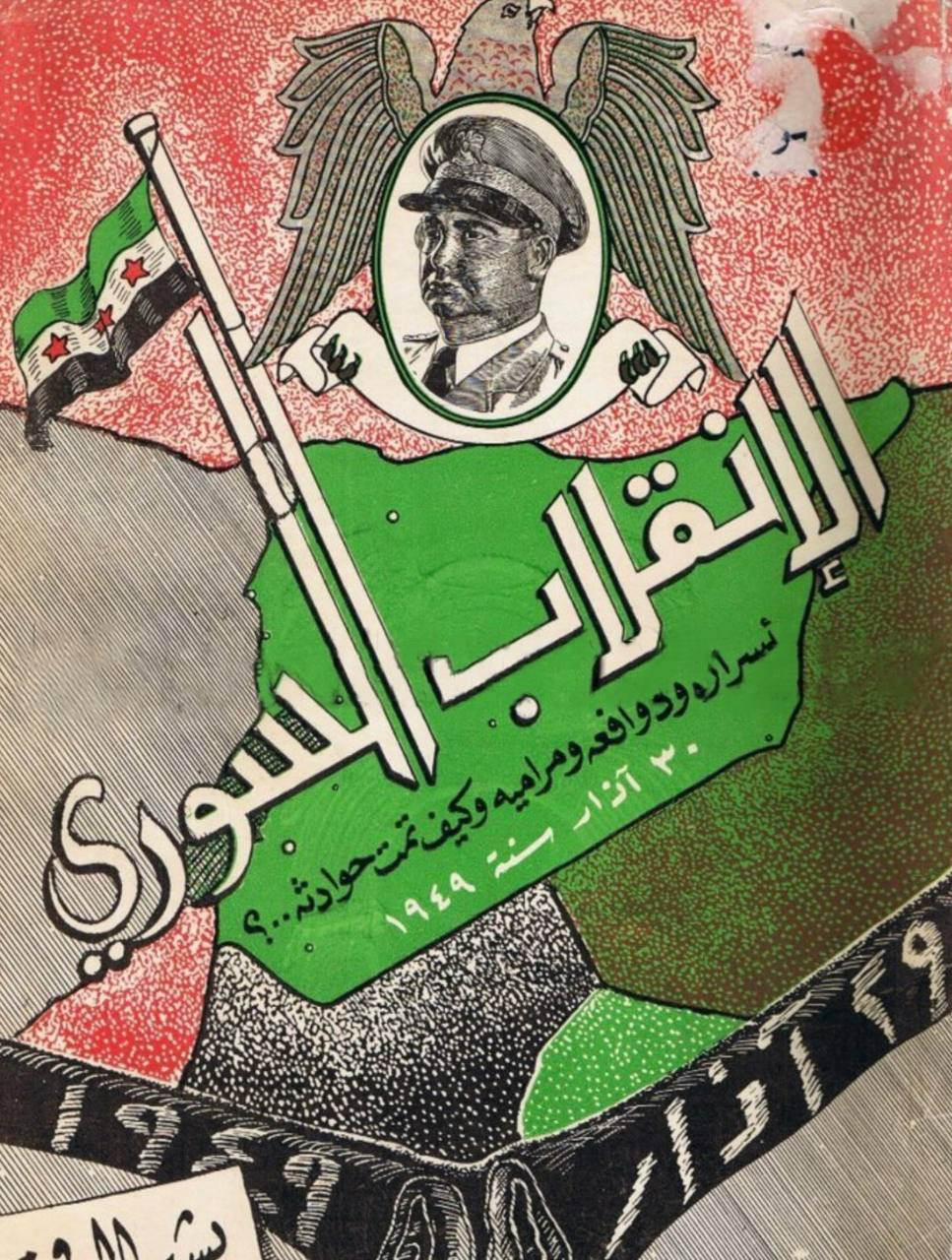
Brochure about the coup d'etat

Prior to the eventual Arab-Israeli Conflict, Syria and the US had rather friendly correspondence. Keeley even met with Quwatli to discuss Syria's role in current Middle Eastern geopolitics on 5 March 1949 (25 days before the coup). among which consisted of Quwatli obliging his determination to "resolutely to pursue a positive policy of collaboration with West." In this same conversation, Keeley disclosed that Quwalti acknowledged that, as Keeley described it in his memorandum, "as part of the price of effective western friendship, concessions must be made and settlement reached on Palestine issue." Copeland attributed the US perceivable benevolence to Syria as part of a larger agenda to ensure the elimination of any residual French control over Syria. Consistent with this notion, before the 1948 war, the US even agreed to provide the Syrian army with weapons and conduct training missions to "reshape" the infant Syrian army. The Syrian military at that time had been generally engineered by the French, and Quwatli believed that many soldiers in the army were originally recruited by the French and were subsequently untrustworthy. He viewed the training collaboration initiative with the US as a way to "purge" the military of officers with French ties. However, before either the US supplied Syria with arms or undertook the training mission with the Syrian military, Washington foresaw the possibility that weapons supplied to Syria may be used against Israel because of the rising tensions over Palestine leading up to the 1947 UN resolution. Quwatli was forced to resort to going to the Soviet Union to purchase arms, which were described to be of lower quality than those available from the US. Joshua Landis, Director for the Center for Middle East Studies at the University of Oklahoma, said that Quwatli was blamed entirely by the Syrian people for the nation's subsequent loss in the war. This resulted in even more protests and civil demonstrations, notably stemming from other political parties. Quwatli responded by declaring martial law and sending the military to beat and subdue protestors. In this moment of chaos, Quwatli turned on Za'im and blamed him for the "loss of Palestine", which Landis characterized as making the army feel like a "scapegoat" and as if it was being "treated unfairly."

Owed to Quwatli's leadership and directives consistent with Arabism and unification of the Arab World after the 1948 Arab-Israeli Conflict, as well as the ensuing disarray that Syria was in after the war, Keeley became amenable to a military coup "as a way of safeguarding ... the long-term prospects of democracy in the country." At Keeley's behest, Meade carefully cultivated a friendship with Za'im ultimately being the one to suggest the idea of the coup to him. According to Copeland's retelling, Meade advised Za'im on not only how to lay the foundation for and prepare to successfully execute the coup, but also guided him through the necessary steps directly preceding the coup.

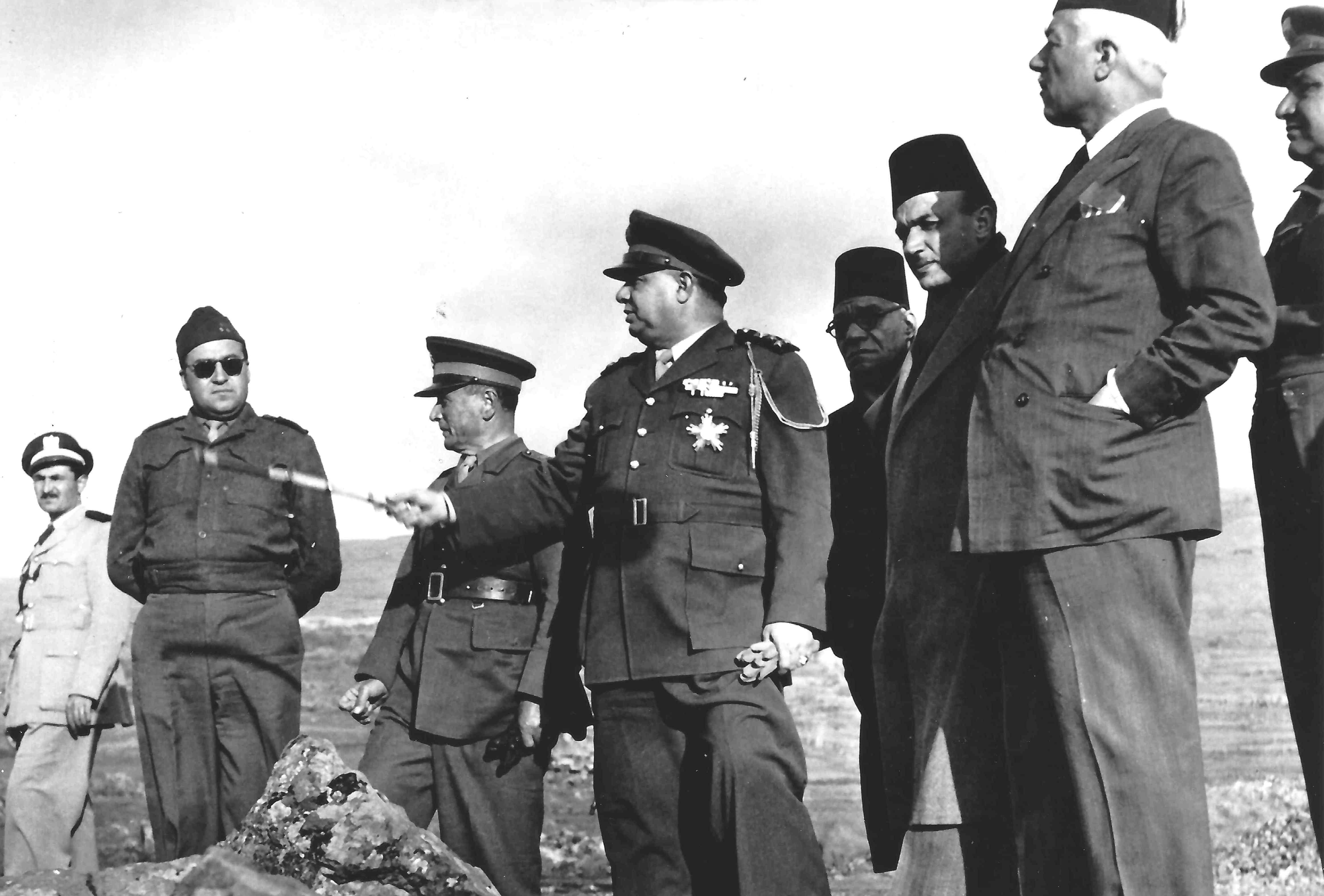
Husni al-Za'im alongside other Syrian military officers on the front of the 1948 Arab-Israeli War

Available evidence, however, suggests that Za'im was in little need of prodding from the Americans. Many in Syria, Za'im included, viewed Syria and the Arab nations' loss in the 1948 conflict as something of a national tragedy and were furious over the country's inability to protect Palestine from the UN declaration. Copeland detailed that Za'im had been contemplating a coup since March 1947, over a year before he was introduced to Meade on 30 November 1948. Shortly before the coup, Za'im had tried to win Western sympathy by producing a list of individuals, including Keeley, that were supposedly "communist assassination targets," but American officials were skeptical. While Za'im directly informed Meade of the upcoming coup on March 3 and March 7, the Americans were not the only foreign power to be apprised since Za'im notified British officials around the same time. Keeley met with Quwatli on March 5 after Za'im was made aware of the coup's possibility. Regardless of Za'im's motivations and prior plans to carry out the coup, Copeland later admitted in a televised interview saying he was part of the team of US operatives that "organized and directed" the coup.

In his conversations with Meade, Za'im outlined his progressive political program for Syria (including land reform) as well as the communist threat and concluded that there was one "way to start the Syrian people along the road to progress and democracy: With the whip." Za'im struck a different tone in his conversations with the British by citing his desire to establish friendlier ties with Britain's major allies in the area: Iraq and Transjordan. In The Game Player, Copeland provided new details on the American assistance to Za'im's plan and expounded that Meade identified specific installations that had to be captured to ensure the coup's success. However, Copeland also acknowledged that Za'im had initiated the plot on his own: "It was Husni's show all the way."

Douglas Little notes that U.S. Assistant Secretary of State George C. McGhee visited Damascus in March, "ostensibly to discuss resettling Palestinian refugees but possibly to authorize U.S. support for Za'im." In contrast, Andrew Rathmell describes this hypothesis as "purely speculative."

== Syrian delay of the Tapline's construction ==
The Trans-Arabian Pipeline, one of the first long-distance oil pipelines in the Middle East outside of Iran, was a joint venture between the Saudi Arabian government, ARAMCO (originally California-Arabian Standard Oil Company), various large US oil companies and the US government. Often referred to as the "Tapline", the pipeline stretched through most of Saudi Arabia, briefly routing through Jordan and Syria before terminating in Sidon, Lebanon. The pipeline was a major development in oil infrastructure and was crucial for global oil trade from 1950 to 1976. In the final stages of the Tapline's conception, with the backdrop of political tension over Israel and Palestine in the late 1940s, the Syrian government under Shukri al-Quwatli rejected the Tapline's proposed route through Syria. Consequently, this delayed the Tapline's establishment indefinitely, until al-Quwatli was overthrown in the 30 March 1949 coup d'état, just four days after Syrian rejection of the Tapline's theoretical route. With tensions between the Soviet Union and the US rising under the shadow of an impending Cold War, the US sought to satisfy the oil needs of Western Europe without draining current US oil reserves. Washington was also interested in modernizing the Middle East and developing cooperative countries in the Middle East without necessarily spending US taxpayer dollars. Resulting from mounting tensions with the Soviet Union, US congressional committees were skeptical of appropriations for direct foreign spending for the Tapline as well. Thus, the US government saw the Tapline as a way to increase Middle Eastern oil revenue, ideally leading to development and further resource cooperation, especially between Saudi Arabia and the US. The Saudi ruler at the time, King Ibn Saud had a "growing appetite" for royalty income that selling Saudi oil provided and viewed selling oil to Western consumers as a convenient way to accomplish such. The Tapline was formally constructed and handled by the Trans-Arabian Pipeline Company, a now subsidiary of ARAMCO. The Suez Canal was the most viable oil trade route to access Europe, and creating a pipeline to forgo the shipping costs associated with sending oil through the canal would save ARAMCO millions of dollars. This additionally served the interests of the parent companies of ARAMCO: Texaco and Standard Oil of California (now Chevron) who carefully moved through anti-trust statutes to secure funding for the Tapline via the participation of Standard Oil of New Jersey and Standard Oil of New York (who later both merged into ExxonMobil). Thus, Washington, these oil giants and King Ibn Saud became more and more interconnected as the Tapline began to be realized.

In 1945, while narrowing in on the final route of the Tapline, the Saudi government objected to the Tapline's establishment through Palestine because of the heavy conflict in the region. The US concurred, and a route through Saudi Arabia, Lebanon Jordan and Syria was agreed upon. Agreements with the individual participant states followed, Jordan complying on 8 August 1946 and Lebanon on 10 August 1946. While Syria signed the agreement for the Tapline on 1 September 1947, the Syrian Parliament refused to ratify the agreement, hinging their compliance with the project on a change of US foreign policy towards Palestine alongside certain "financial demands" from ARAMCO. In December 1946, Syria forced ARAMCO into a tough position, as ARAMCO originally wanted the Tapline to end on the Syrian coastline. ARAMCO threatened to "override" Syria's autonomy in the matter altogether, worsening tensions between the parties. After the US recognized Israel as a state in 1948, the Syrian Parliament re-anchored themselves to the issue of Palestine, cementing the current Syrian government's deviation from the Tapline's realization and its benefactors' agendas. Sources show that even the US State Department Chief petroleum expert Charles Rayner reassured ARAMCO executives in 1944, "this Government will assist you in every appropriate way with other governments concerned ... to secure such rights and safeguards as may be necessary in connection with the construction of the pipeline."

Four days after the coup d'état on 30 March 1949, the new Syrian military dictator: Husni al-Za'im, approved the Tapline's planned route through the Golan Heights in Syria after dissolving the Parliament. King Ibn Saud met the new Syrian establishment with congratulations, saying, "We are pleased that God has crowned your efforts to establish a new Syrian Government with success and in recognizing this government we extend to your Excellency our hearty and best wishes for your success and prosperity and happiness of the Syrian nation."

One of the main requirements of the US in exchange of support Za'im and future Syrian governments was unwavering Syrian compliance with the Tapline throughout its construction. Even after Za'im was overthrown in August 1949, the new regime under Colonel Sami al-Hinnawi maintained its stance on the Tapline determined by Za'im's government. Available sources indicate that President Truman and the US government conditioned their recognition of the new Syrian government under "continued adherence to the Tapline accord."

== Armistice with Israel after 1948 conflict ==
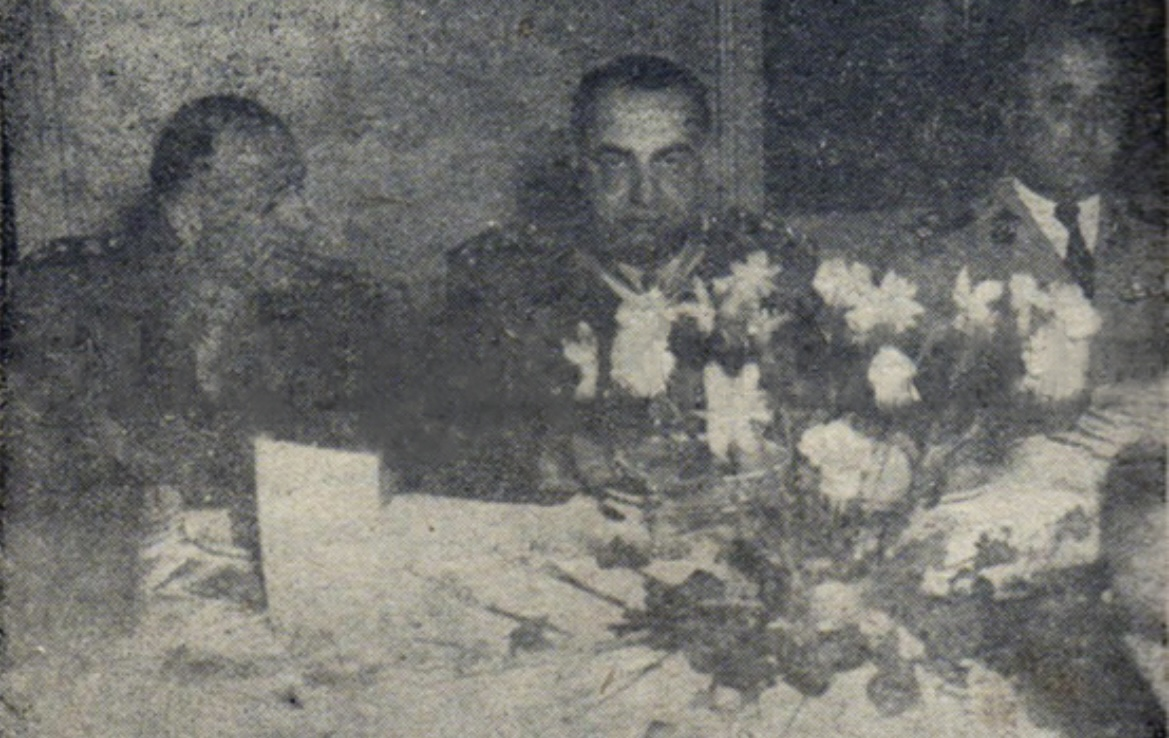
Syrian officers after the coup

Syrian armistice negotiations with Israel to end hostilities of the 1948 war started in April 1949, after armistice agreements had already been reached by the other Arab countries. On 20 July 1949, Syria signed the Israel-Syria Armistice Agreement for formally ending hostilities along the border. Under the agreement, Syria withdrew its forces from most of the territories of the former Mandate Palestine that it controlled west of the international border, which became a demilitarized zone.

Syrian Prime Minister Muhsin al-Barazi was given the task of conducting secret negotiations with Israel for a peace treaty between the two countries and to discuss a possible summit between Za'im and Israeli Prime Minister David Ben-Gurion. The talks reached advanced levels and Israeli Foreign Minister Moshe Sharett contacted al-Barazi on 6 August 1949 to discuss a date for formal peace talks.

== Rebellion ==
Za'im inspired rebellion among his officers by betraying Antoun Saadeh, the founder and president of the Syrian Social Nationalist Party (SSNP). Saadeh had pledged to set up a friendly government in Lebanon, but on 8 July, Za'im abducted Saadeh and handed him over to the Lebanese authorities, who tried him for treason and executed him on the same day.

== Aftermath of Za'im regime ==
Za'im's short-lived presidency ended on 14 August 1949 in a military coup staged by Sami al-Hinnawi, along with several other SSNP officers, who promptly executed Za'im and Muhsin al-Barazi and installed Hashim al-Atassi as president. Another military coup took place in December, the third of that year, this time led by Adib Shishakli, who kept al-Atassi as president until 3 December 1951. On 31 October 1950, al-Hiwanni was murdered by Hersho al-Barazi, a cousin of Muhsin al-Barazi.

After six years, former democratically elected president Shukri al-Quwatli returned to Syria after his exile in Egypt and was elected as president once again in 1955.

== See also ==
- 1954 Syrian coup d'état
- 1963 Syrian coup d'état
- 1966 Syrian coup d'état
- CIA activities in Syria

== Bibliography ==
- Carleton, Alford (1950). "The Syrian Coups D'État of 1949". Middle East Journal. 4 (1): 1–11. ISSN 0026-3141. JSTOR 4322135.
- Drewry, James C., Jr. (1960). An Analysis of the 1949 coup d'état in Syria in the Light of Fertile Crescent Unity (Thesis). American University of Beirut.
- Rihan, Carl (2025). Coup in Damascus: Syria and the birth of Arab military rule, 1949. Manchester University Press. doi:10.7765/9781526151056. ISBN 978-1-5261-5105-6.
- Wilford, Hugh (2013). America's Great Game: The CIA's Secret Arabists and the Making of the Modern Middle East. Basic Books. ISBN 9780465019656.
- Whitman, Elizabeth (2011). The Awakening of the Syrian Army: General Husni al-Za'im's Coup and Reign, 1949 (Phd Thesis). Columbia University. doi:10.7916/D82Z1CHZ. S2CID 154180574.
