= Trans-Arabian Pipeline =

Oil pipeline

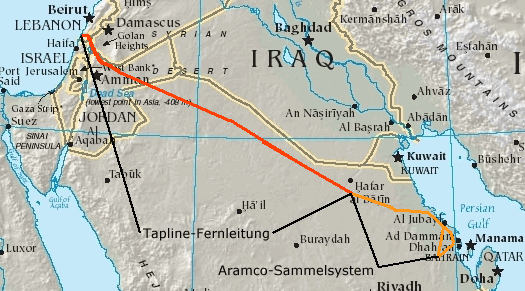
A map of the Trans-Arabian Pipeline

The Trans-Arabian Pipeline (Tapline), was an oil pipeline from Qaisumah in Saudi Arabia to Sidon in Lebanon. It was an important factor in the global trade of petroleum, as well as in American–Middle Eastern political relations, while locally helping with the economic development of Lebanon. The pipeline was built and operated by the Trans-Arabian Pipeline Company, now a fully owned subsidiary of Aramco. The full length of the pipeline was active during 1950–1976. The Saudi and Jordanian portions continued to operate until it largely ceased functioning in 1983 and completely stopped operating in 1990.

Tapline was the second long distance oil pipeline built in the Middle East outside of Iran. The Iraq Petroleum Company completed the twin 12-inch Kirkuk-Haifa oil pipeline in 1934 and already laid a 16-inch loop in 1948-1949 and reached a nameplate capacity of 250,000 barrels per day. The Iraq Petroleum Company had to shut down half of it when Iraq refused to cooperate with Israel. Once finished with the Tapline project, Bechtel constructed a 30-inch loop to the Iraq pipeline, which had a capacity of 300,000 barrels per day and was finished in April 1952.

== History ==
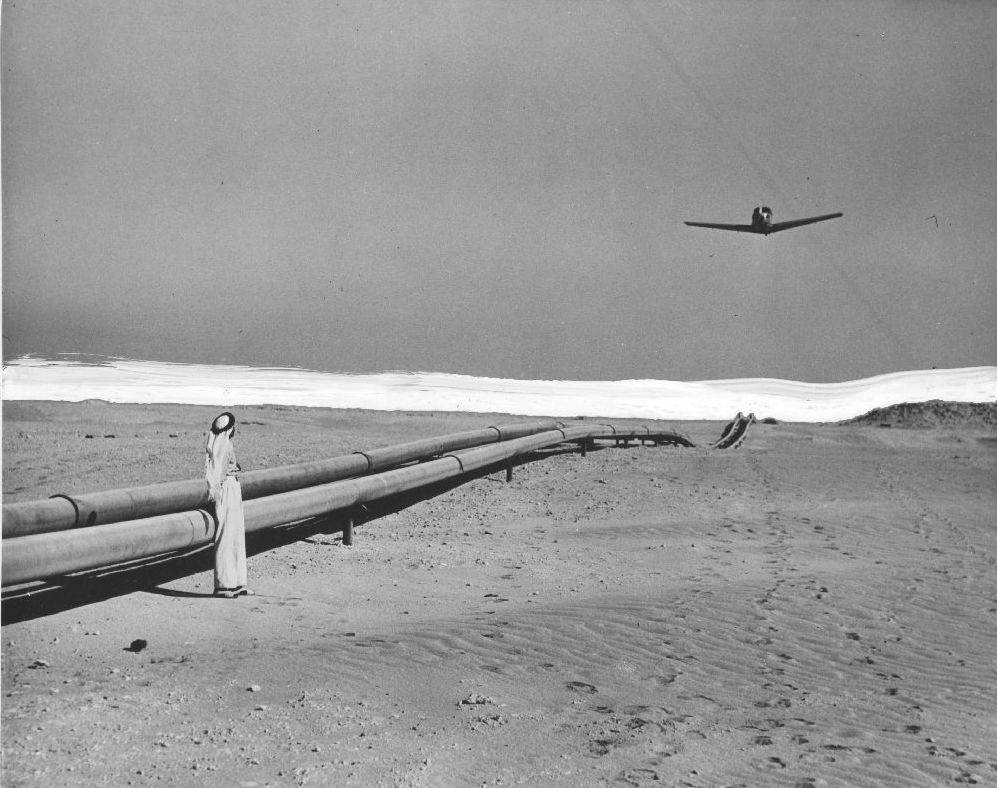
The Trans-Arabian Pipeline in 1950

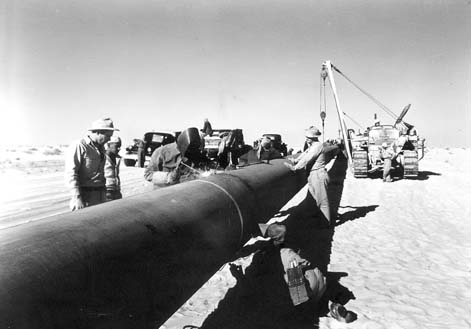
Welding the pipes, 1947

Construction of the Trans-Arabian Pipeline began in 1947 and was mainly managed by the American company Bechtel. Consolidated Steel of Los Angeles was contracted to provide 980 miles of 30 and 31-inch pipe in sections 31 feet long in March 1947 (date of press notice) and the National Tube Company of Pittsburgh, a U.S. Steel subsidiary, for another 70 miles. It was the second pipe contract for Consolidated, then still busy with their plant's inaugural 214 mile 30-inch section of the Texas-California pipeline.

Originally the Tapline was intended to terminate in Haifa, which was then in the British Mandate of Palestine. Due to the establishment of the state of Israel, an alternative route through the Syrian Golan Heights and Lebanon was selected, with an export terminal in Sidon. The 12-inch Haifa branch and the almost completed 16-inch loop line of the Kirkuk–Haifa oil pipeline had to shut down in April 1948 due to the regional conflict, and it never opened again.

The Syrian government initially opposed the plan. Four days after a military coup that overthrew democratic rule, the deal was ratified. The coup's leader Husni al-Za'im was overthrown and murdered 136 days later, but the project was unstoppable.

The RCA International Division (RCA) was recruited in 1947 to develop a telecommunications network for the project. RCA International Director H.C. Edgar oversaw the design and installation of the network that connected telephone and teletype signals from Tapline's Beirut headquarters to Ras el Mishaab on the Persian Gulf. Radio communications also served construction crews, camps, vehicles, and survey parties, providing eight voice channels, two teletype channels, and two control channels using VHF frequencies. Until the pipeline became operational in 1950, H.C. Edgar managed the network, which had already processed over 500,000 telegrams and 750,000 telephone calls. Once Tapline was active, a Radio Dispatch office in Beirut managed the oil flow by sending instructions via the terminal's radio room.

The final communications network utilized parallel telephone and teletype circuits operating between 250 and 88,000 kilocycles. An automatic repeater station in Rafha, located midway along the pipeline, received signals from the pumping stations and retransmitted them. Additionally, telephone switchboard operators coordinated all communications for vehicles and aircraft.

During the Suez Crisis, the Suez canal, the biggest artery for oil, was shut down. The Kirkuk–Baniyas pipeline's three pumping stations on Syrian soil were sabotaged, together with the parallel 12-inch and 16-inch Tripoli lines. Tapline was not affected and continued to transport 340,000 bbl/day. A modernization program was underway, including the installation of four 5,000hp gas turbine auxiliary pumps in existing stations with a planned increase by 90,000 bbl/day. The Saudi government had however forbidden the loading of British and French tankers at Sidon and had cut off the 200,000 barrel per day refinery of the Bahrain Petroleum Company from its supply of Saudi Arabian oil, amounting to 170,000bpd.

In 1958, RCA International oversaw the further installation and repair work of communications equipment along the Saudi section of the pipeline. RCA technicians who were based at Qaisumah between September and December worked on radio equipment at stations along the Tapline Road.

After the 1967 Six-Day War, the section of the pipeline which runs through the Golan Heights came under Israeli control. The Israelis permitted the pipeline's operation to continue. The pipeline was attacked and damaged by the Popular Front for the Liberation of Palestine in May 1969. Due to the attack, tons of oil spilt into the Sea of Galilee and both Aramco and the Saudi government lost significant revenues.

After years of constant arguing between Saudi Arabia and Syria and Lebanon over transit fees, the emergence of oil supertankers, and pipeline breakdowns, the section of the line beyond Jordan ceased operation in 1976. The remainder of the line between Saudi Arabia and Jordan continued to transport modest amounts of petroleum until 1990, when the Saudis cut off the pipeline in response to Jordan's support of Iraq during the first Gulf War. Today, the entire line is unfit for oil transport.

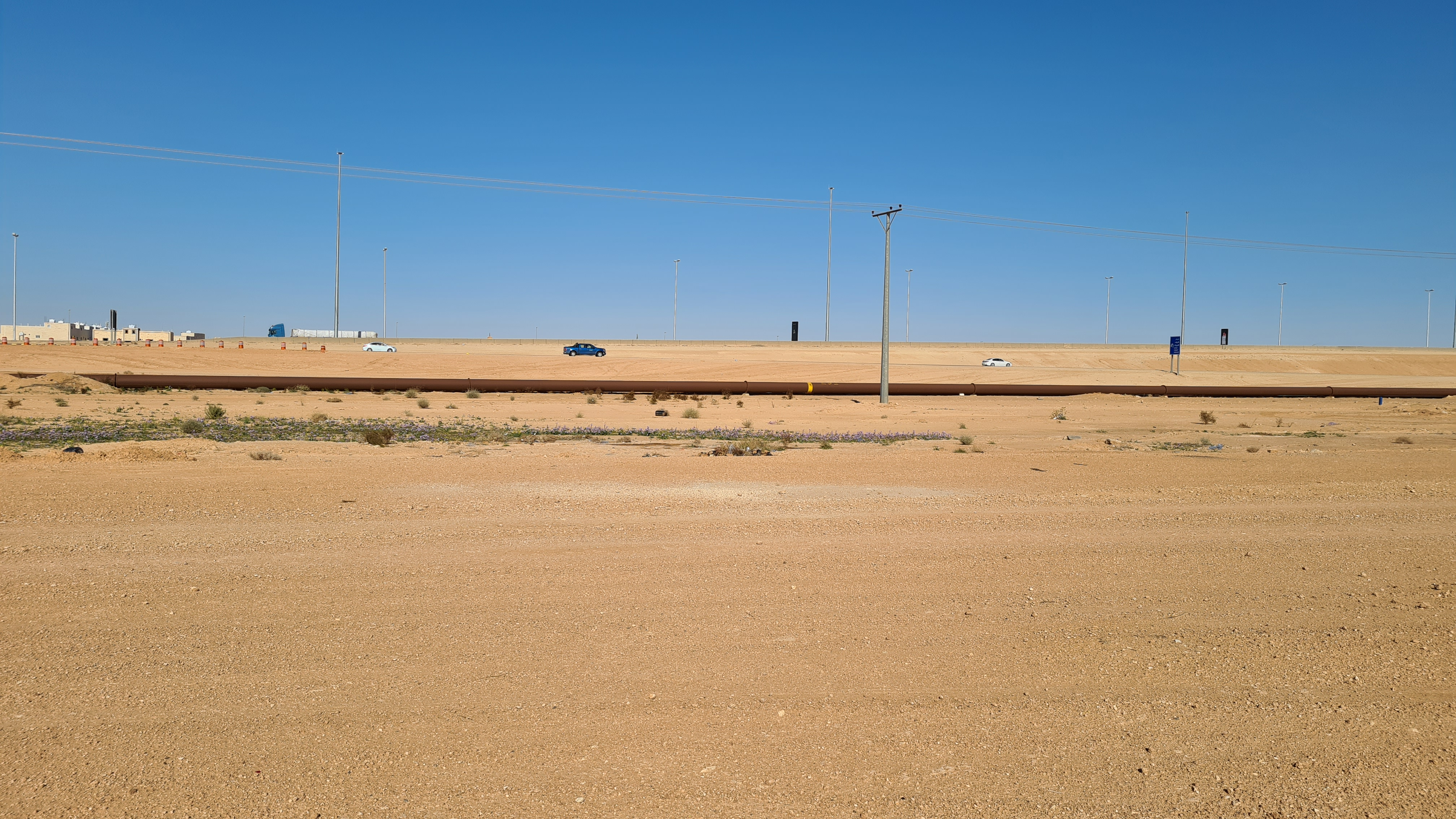

== Technical features ==
The Trans-Arabian Pipeline was 1,214 kilometres (754 mi) long with a diameter of 30 inches (760 mm) and 31 inches. When constructed, it was the world's largest oil pipeline system. The initial capacity of the pipeline was 300,000 barrels per day (48,000 m^{3}/d) (bpd), eventually rising to a maximum capacity of about 500,000 bbl/d (79,000 m^{3}/d) with the addition of several more pumping stations.

While the pipeline was considered groundbreaking and innovative at the time it was built, were it still operational to this day it would be considered somewhat outdated. Most modern long-distance pipelines constructed in the second half of the twentieth century were built to a diameter of 42 inches (1,070 mm) or 48 inches (1,220 mm) and are able to transport considerably more crude oil per day than the Tapline did in its heyday. The pipeline was supplied from the oil fields near Abqaiq.

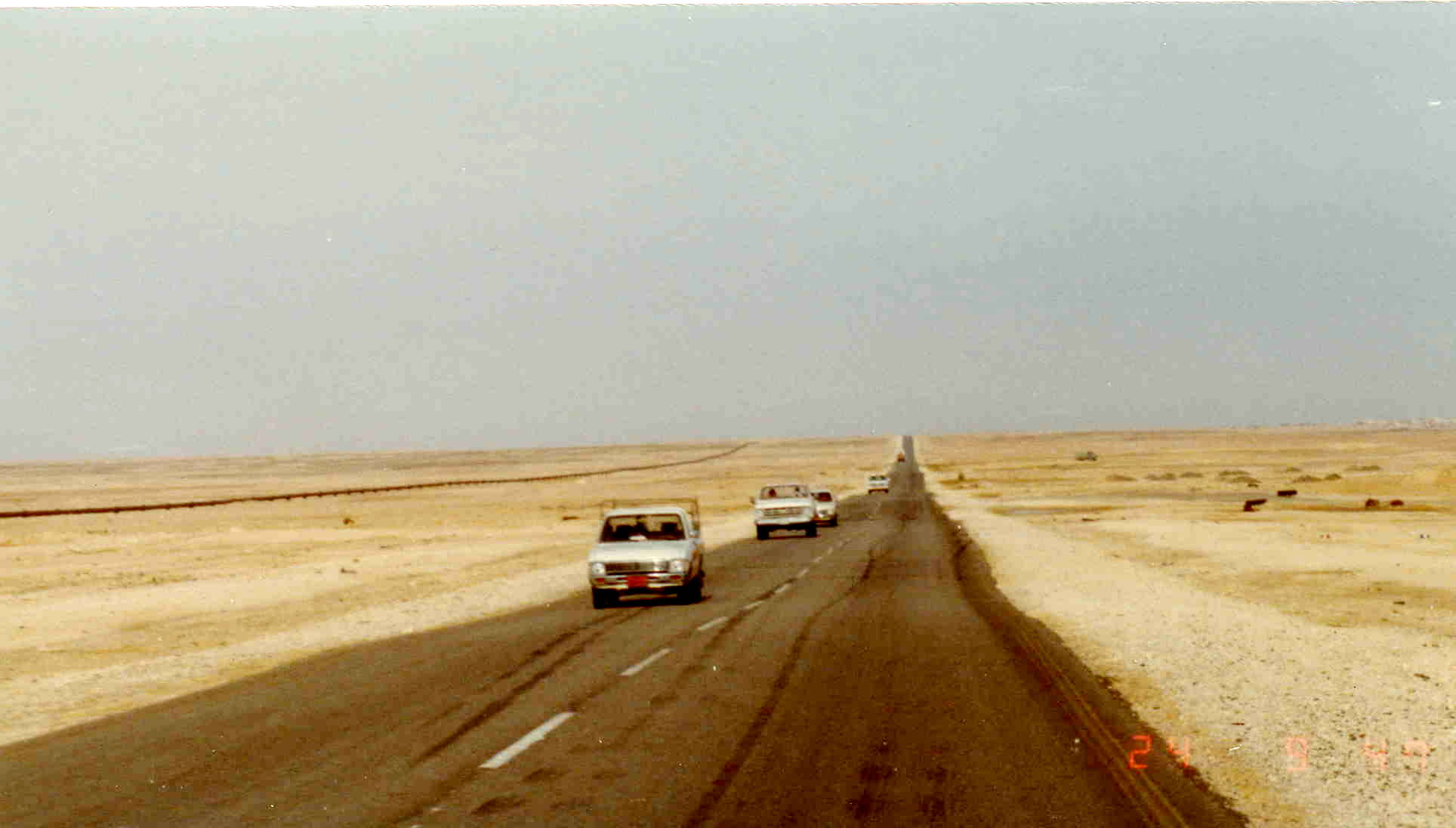
The pipeline in 1982, still buried

The Tapline corridor has remained a potential export route for Persian Gulf oil exports to Europe and the United States. At least one analysis has indicated that the transportation cost of exporting oil via the Tapline through Haifa to Europe would cost as much as 40 percent less than shipping by tanker through the Suez Canal. In early 2005, rehabilitation of the Tapline at an estimated cost of US$100 to US$300 million was one of the strategic options being considered by the Jordanian government to meet oil needs.

== Pipeline company ==
The pipeline was built and operated by the Trans-Arabian Pipeline Company. It was founded as a joint venture between Standard Oil of New Jersey (now ExxonMobil), Standard Oil of California (Chevron), the Texas Company (better known as Texaco, now a part of Chevron), and Socony-Vacuum Oil Company (now part of ExxonMobil).

It eventually became a fully owned subsidiary of Aramco. The company continued operating with no oil being transported until the end of 2002, when Aramco fully closed the Tapline subsidiary.

== Tapline Road ==
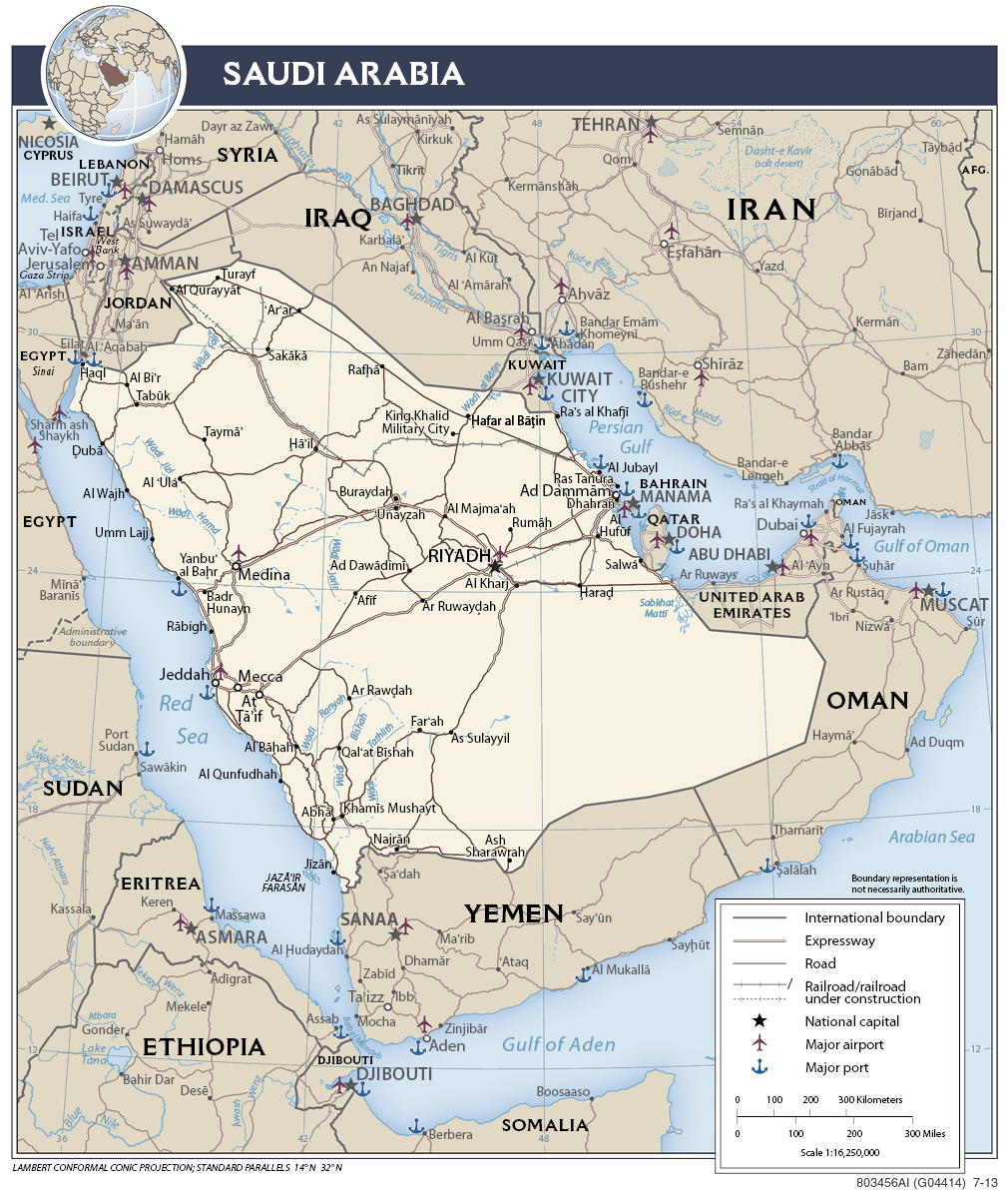
The Tapline Road as the northernmost road running along the Iraq-Saudi Border

Tapline Road is the major east-west two lane highway running the width of Saudi Arabia from Turaif, on Saudi Arabia's border with Jordan, in the west, to Qaisumah, on the Persian Gulf, in the east. It was so named because it parallels the Trans-Arabian Pipeline. The Tapline Road was, on average, only 50 kilometers from Saudi Arabia's northern border for a distance of 514 miles or 827.2 kilometers.

Initially only a dirt and gravel road used by ARAMCO and the Saudi Government it was widened and paved by 1965 due to use by civilian and commercial traffic. It was incorporated into the Saudi Highway system in 1965 when it was extended into Dammam.

Since Tapline Road is a semi-private road mostly maintained by Aramco, and has been assigned the number 6335 until it meets Highway 85 (King Fahd Road) where-after it is maintained by the Saudi Arabian Ministry of Transport, it remains Highway 85 until near the Jordanian border where it meets Highway 65, in Qurayyat and crosses the Jordanian Border at Umari and becomes Jordanian Highway 30. Tapline Road/Highway 85 is deemed the longest straight road in the world.

== See also ==
- East–West Crude Oil Pipeline, Gulf oil transported to the Red Sea
- Arab Gas Pipeline, active pipeline in the Levant

Historical:

- Kirkuk–Haifa oil pipeline, active 1935–1948
- Petroleum Road
- March 1949 Syrian coup d'état
