= Muhsin al-Barazi =

Syrian politician

- محسن البرازي
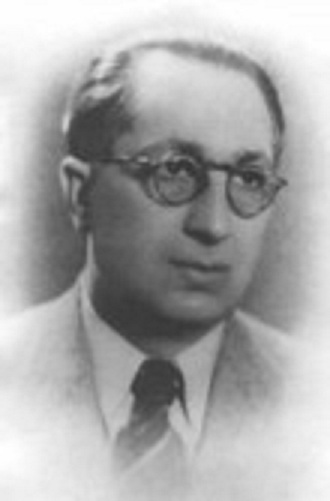

Prime Minister of Syria
- In office 25 June 1949 – 14 August 1949
- President: Husni al-Za'im
- Preceded by: Husni al-Za'im
- Succeeded by: Hashim al-Atassi

Minister of Foreign Affairs
- In office 1948–1948
- Preceded by: Jamil Mardam Bey
- Succeeded by: Khalid al-Azm
- In office 25 June 1949 – 14 August 1949
- Preceded by: Adil Arslan
- Succeeded by: Nazim al-Kudsi

Personal details
- Born: 1904 Hama, Ottoman Syria
- Died: 14 August 1949 (aged 44–45) Damascus, Syria
- Party: League of Nationalist Action

Muhsin al-Barazi (Arabic: محسن البرازي; 1904 – 14 August 1949) was a Syrian lawyer, academic and politician. He served a short term as a Prime Minister of Syria in 1949 and was executed after a military coup d'état by members of the far-right SSNP overthrew his government.

== Early life ==
Al-Barazi was born to a prominent Kurdish family in Hama and obtained a law degree from the University of Paris in 1930. He later became a professor of law at Damascus University.

== Political career ==
Between April and September 1941, Al-Barazi served as minister of education in the first cabinet of Khalid al-Azm.

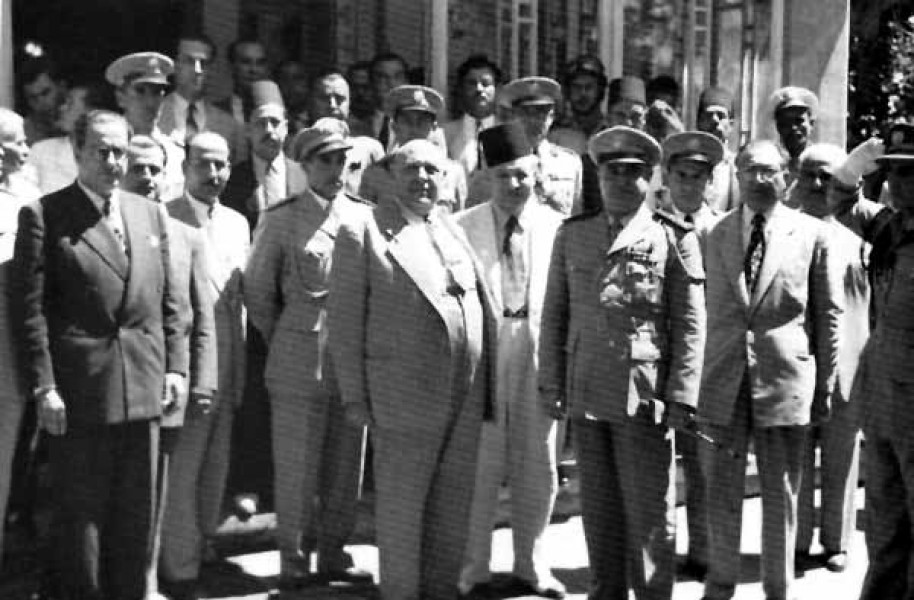
Al-Barazi, along with al-Zaim, as-Solh and al-Khoury at the Syrian-Lebanese summit of July 1949

=== Downfall and execution ===
Colonel Sami al-Hinnawi, along with several other SSNP officers, led a coup d'état that overthrew the al-Zaim regime on 14 August 1949. Al-Zaim and al-Barazi were captured and executed by a firing squad at the Military Barracks, in Damascus.

His granddaughter, Arwa Damon, is a CNN senior international correspondent, and his cousin’s grandson Azad Al-Barazi is a swimmer.

Preceded by Husni al-Za'im	Prime Minister of Syria; 25 June 1949 – 14 August 1949	Succeeded by Hashim al-Atassi
