= Husni al-Za'im =

President of Syria (1949)

- حسني الزعيم
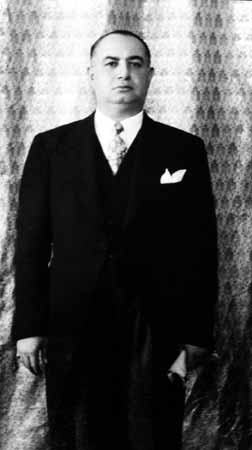

President of Syria
- In office 26 June 1949 – 14 August 1949
- Prime Minister: Muhsin al-Barazi
- Preceded by: Shukri al-Quwatli
- Succeeded by: Sami Hilmy al-Hinnawi (acting); Hashim al-Atassi

Prime Minister of Syria
- In office 30 March 1949 – 26 June 1949
- Preceded by: Khalid al-Azm
- Succeeded by: Muhsin al-Barazi

Personal details
- Born: 11 May 1897 Aleppo, Aleppo Vilayet, Ottoman Empire
- Died: 14 August 1949 (aged 52) Damascus, Syria
- Party: Independent politician SSNP (affiliated)
- Spouse: Nouran Qara Zadeh
- Profession: Statesman, soldier

Military service
- Allegiance: Ottoman Empire; French Mandate of Syria; (Second Syrian Republic) First Syrian Republic
- Branch/service: Ottoman Army; French Army; Syrian Army
- Years of service: 1917–1949
- Rank: Brigadier General
- Battles/wars: First World War; Middle Eastern theatre; Great Syrian Revolt; 1948 Arab–Israeli War

Husni al-Za'im (Arabic: حسني الزعيم Ḥusnī az-Za’īm; 11 May 1897 – 14 August 1949) was a Syrian military officer who served as head of state of Syria in 1949. He had been an officer in the Ottoman Army. After France instituted its colonial mandate over Syria after the First World War, he became an officer in the French Army and later in the Syrian Army of the newly-independent Syrian Republic.

Following Abdullah Atfeh's early defeats in the early days of the 1948 Arab-Israeli War, al-Zaim was made Chief of Staff. The defeat of the Arab League forces in that war shook Syria and undermined confidence in the country's unstable parliamentary democracy, allowing him to seize power in 1949. However, his reign as head of state was brief; he was tried and executed in August 1949 by his former coup co-conspirators.

== Early life ==
Husni al-Za’im was born in 1897 in Aleppo, then part of the Ottoman Empire. His father, Sheikh رضا al-Za’im, served as a religious authority in the Ottoman army, while his mother was of Kurdish origin. He received his early education in Aleppo before enrolling at a military school in Istanbul. During the First World War, he served in the Ottoman army and was captured by British forces. After his release, he joined the army of Emir Faisal in Syria.

== Career ==
=== 1949 coup d'état ===
On 30 March 1949, al-Za'im seized power in a bloodless coup d'état. There are 'highly controversial' allegations that the Central Intelligence Agency (CIA) engineered the coup. Most of the evidence currently available suggests that the decision to initiate a coup was Za'im's alone, but Za'im benefited from some degree of American assistance in planning the operation.

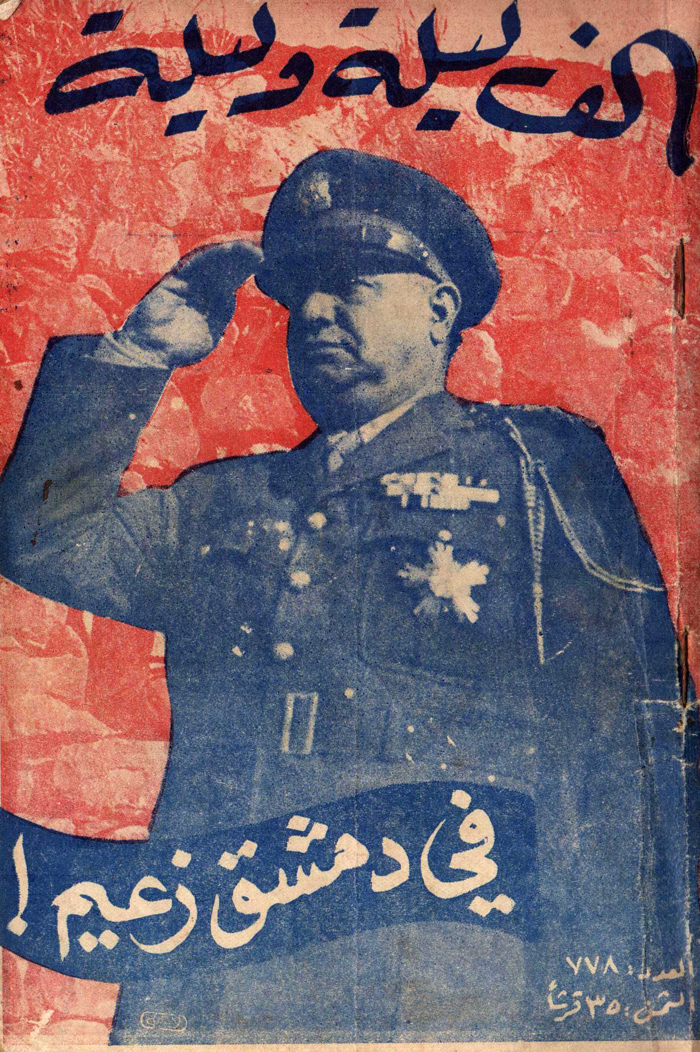
Cover of the Syrian Army magazine on the day of the coup: "One Thousand and One Nights, in Damascus there is a leader!"

Four days after the coup that overthrew democratic rule the Syrian government ratified the controversial Trans-Arabian Pipeline (Tapline) deal.

Syria's former president, Shukri al-Quwatli, was briefly imprisoned, but then released into exile in Egypt. Al-Za'im also imprisoned many political leaders, such as Munir al-Ajlani, whom he accused of conspiring to overthrow the republic. The coup was carried out with discreet backing of the American embassy, concerned about the increasing presence of far left anti-democratic elements in the government, and possibly assisted by the Syrian Social Nationalist Party, although al-Za'im himself is not known to have been a member. Among the officers that assisted al-Za'im's takeover was Adib al-Shishakli and Sami al-Hinnawi, who staged another coup four months later on 13 August 1949 and had al-Za'im tried and executed by a firing squad the following day on 14 August 1949.

Al-Za'im's takeover, the first military coup in the history of Syria, would have lasting effects, as it shattered the country's fragile and flawed democratic rule, and set off a series of increasingly violent military revolts. Two more would follow in August and December 1949.

=== President of Syria ===
His secular policies and proposals for the emancipation of women through granting them the vote and suggesting they should give up the Islamic practice of veiling, created a stir among Muslim religious leaders (Women's suffrage was only achieved during the third civilian administration of Hashim al-Atassi, a staunch opponent of military rule). Raising taxes also aggrieved businessmen, and Arab nationalists were still smouldering over his signing of a cease-fire with Israel, as well as his deals with US oil companies for building the Trans-Arabian Pipeline. He made a peace overture to Israel offering to settle 300,000 Palestinian refugees in Syria, in exchange for border modifications along the cease fire line and half of Israel's Lake Tiberias. Settling the refugees was made conditional on sufficient outside assistance for the Syrian economy. The overture was answered very slowly by Tel Aviv and not treated seriously.

Lacking popular support, al-Za'im was overthrown after just four and a half months by his colleagues, al-Shishakli and al-Hinnawi. As al-Hinnawi took power as leader of a military junta, Husni al-Za'im was swiftly spirited away to Mezze prison in Damascus, and executed along with Prime Minister Muhsin al-Barazi.

Al-Za'im worked hard to abolish wearing the fez, claiming that it was outdated headwear taken from the days of the Ottoman Empire.

He is credited for giving support to women's right to vote and run for public office in Syria. The law had been debated at the Syrian Parliament since 1920 and no leader dared to support it, except Za'im.

During the 137 days of his rule in Syria al-Za'im did not execute anyone. He did have inventive punishments for those who disobeyed him, however. When the quality of bread dropped to unacceptable levels, Zaim ordered all bakers to walk on the gravel, barefoot, until blood flowed from their feet.

== Family ==
Husni al-Za’im's wife Nouran, was the first lady of Syria from April to August 1949. The marriage took place in 1947, two years before Husni al-Zaim became President of the Republic. In order to please his young wife, Zaim asked her 11-year-old sister Kariman to live with them in Damascus. He treated her as a sister as well, and sent her to the Lycee Laique (one of the finest preparatory high schools in town). Another sister Orfan, would visit them often, and took up the habit of playing with a guard, Abdel Hamid Sarraj (the chief of security at the president's office who went on to become head of the intelligence bureau and minister of interior during the union years with Egypt 1958–1961).

During the incidence of al-Za'im's arrest, and when the guards came to arrest him, Zaim got dressed and said goodbye to his pregnant wife. "Relax" he asked her, "I will be back soon to receive our first baby together!" Niveen (his daughter) said, "My mother and aunt told me that the couch they had been sitting on was riddled with bullets. Sarraj knew in advance that an attack was coming and told them to go upstairs to keep them from harm's way." Less than a week before the coup—which led to the execution by firing squad of Za'im and his Prime Minister Muhsen al-Barazi—Nouran's cousins came to him, saying that they had confirmed intelligence information. They added that Sami al-Hinnawi (his comrade from the war of 1948) was planning to have him killed. Zaim summoned Hinnawi and directly asked, "Sami, my brothers-in-law are telling me you want to kill me?" Hinnawi replied, "Impossible. How can I kill my leader and friend?" After the president was arrested on 14 August, Nouran and her sister were kept under house arrest for an entire week. "No food was brought into the house," said Niveen. A Senegalese guard tried helping them by passing his own food through the window.

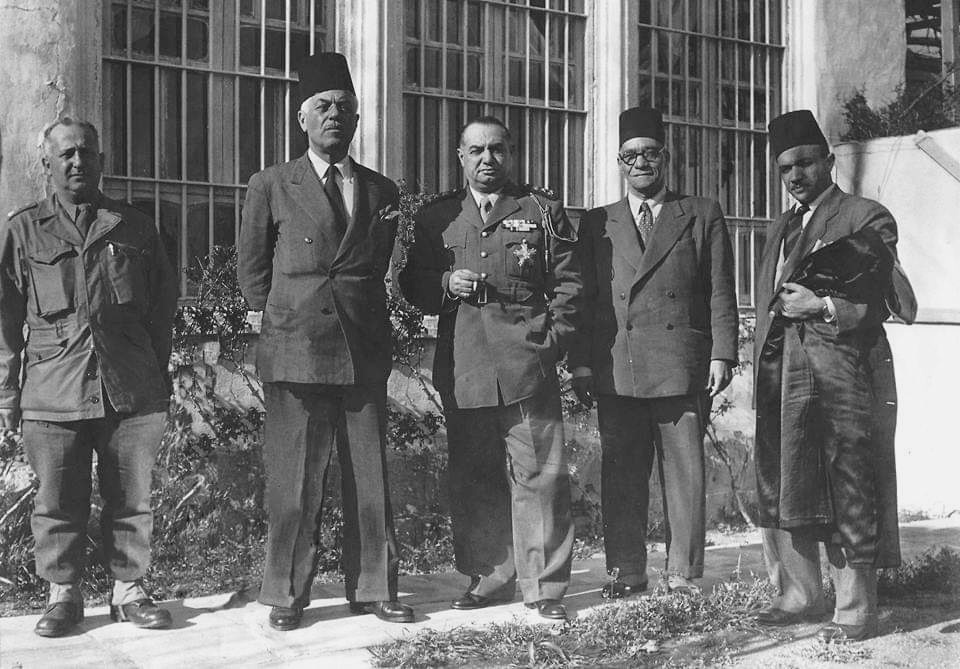
Husni al-Zaim in the middle, 1940s.

Preceded by Shukri al-Kuwatli	President of Syria; 1949(4 months and 3 days)	Succeeded by Hashim al-Atassi (military rule)
