= Sami al-Hinnawi =

Syrian politician and military officer

Sami al-Hinnawi سامي الحناوي
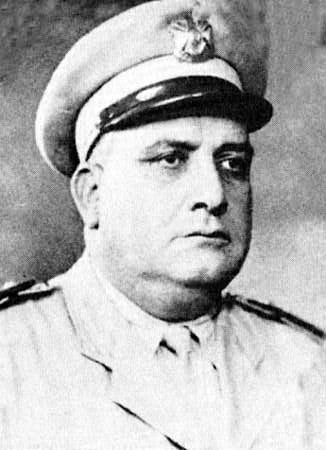

De facto leader of the First Syrian Republic
- In office 14 August 1949 – 19 December 1949
- President: Himself; Hashim al-Atassi
- Prime Minister: Hashim al-Atassi
- Preceded by: Husni al-Za'im (As President of Syria)
- Succeeded by: Adib Shishakli

Acting President of Syria
- In office 14 August 1949–15 August 1949
- Prime Minister: Hashim al-Atassi
- Preceded by: Husni al-Za'im
- Succeeded by: Hashim al-Atassi

Chief of the General Staff
- In office 1949 – 2 January 1950
- Preceded by: Husni al-Za'im
- Succeeded by: Anwar Bannud

Personal details
- Born: 1898 Aleppo, Aleppo Vilayet, Ottoman Syria, Ottoman Empire
- Died: 30 October 1950 (aged 51–52) Beirut, Lebanon
- Resting place: Damascus
- Party: Syrian Social Nationalist Party

Military service
- Rank: Colonel

Sami Hilmy al-Hinnawi (Arabic: محمد سامي حلمي الحناوي, romanized: Muḥammad Sāmī Ḥilmī al-Ḥinnāwī; 1898 – 30 October 1950) was a Syrian politician and military officer.

== Life ==
On December 19, 1949, Adib Shishakli carried out a coup d'état (the third that year), strengthening his dictatorship. On October 30, 1950, al-Hinnawi was assassinated in Beirut, the capital of Lebanon, by Hersho al-Barazi, a cousin of Muhsin al-Barazi, the Prime Minister who had been overthrown and killed in Hinnawi's coup.
