= July 2025 Damascus airstrikes =

Airstrikes conducted by Israel

- Part of the 2025 Southern Syria clashes
- Location: Damascus, Syria
- Date: 16 July 2025 c. 3 p.m. (UTC+3)
- Target: Syrian Armed Forces
- Attack type: Airstrikes
- Deaths: 5+
- Injuries: 34+
- Perpetrators: Israel Defense Forces; Israeli Air Force

On 16 July 2025, Israel conducted airstrikes on several government buildings in Damascus, Syria, including the Syrian military headquarters and the vicinity of the presidential palace. The strikes killed at least 3 people and injured another 34. Israel said that it had struck the buildings as a "warning" in defense of the Druze amid the July 2025 Southern Syria clashes. Israel had invaded parts of Syria in December 2024 and proposed a demilitarized zone in southern Syria, forbidding Syrian troops from moving there.

== Background ==
Following the fall of the Assad regime on 8 December 2024, Israel took advantage of the power vacuum caused by the fall of Syrian president Bashar al-Assad to carry out an aerial bombing campaign to cripple the Syrian Army and invade parts of Syria and occupy several hundred square miles of territory, declaring the 1974 Agreement on Disengagement with Ba'athist Syria to be void. Despite engaging in peace talks brokered by the United States aimed at ceasing hostilities and normalizing relations between the two nations in late June 2025, Israel had continued to pledge to "protect the Syrian Druze" and warn that it would conduct strikes on Syria if its troops entered the three southern governorates it declared to be demilitarized zones — Quneitra, Daraa, and Suwayda.

On 13 July 2025, clashes erupted between Druze and Bedouin armed groups in Suwayda, resulting in the deaths of at least 200 people. Following the Syrian transitional government's decision to deploy the Syrian Armed Forces to the region to restore order, Druze leader Hikmat al-Hijri called for armed resistance against the government and the Bedouin and asked Israel to "save Suwayda." Israeli Prime Minister Benjamin Netanyahu subsequently ordered strikes on Syrian forces and weapons entering Suwayda, saying the government "intended to use them against the Druze."

== Airstrikes ==
On 16 July 2025, at around 15:00 AST, Israeli fighter jets launched four airstrikes on Damascus, damaging the Army General Command and defense ministry buildings adjacent to Umayyad Square, as well as the vicinity of the presidential palace, causing "extensive" damage in central Damascus according to the Syrian Observatory for Human Rights. The defense ministry was struck twice, causing the collapse of four floors of the buildings and ruining two of its facades, and its entrance.

Israel said Syrian commanders in the military headquarters were directing government forces in Suwayda, while the strike on the presidential palace's vicinity served as a "warning" to the government to withdraw from Suwayda. The Syrian Ministry of Health reported at least three deaths and another 34 injuries. A Syrian medical source said the strikes killed five members of the security forces.

== Aftermath ==
Following the strikes, U.S. Secretary of State Marco Rubio said the Trump administration had engaged with all parties to end what he called a "troubling and horrifying situation," labeling it a "misunderstanding." Soon after, a ceasefire agreement was reached, ending military operations and requiring Syrian forces to withdraw from Suwayda.

== Reactions ==
=== State actors ===
- Bahrain: The foreign Ministry expressed firm supports for Syria's security and stability.
- China: The spokesperson of the Foreign Ministry, Lin Jian, called for respecting for Syria's territorial integrity and refraining from any actions that could further escalate the situation in the Middle East.
- Egypt: Egypt condemned the Israeli strikes on Syria. It called for respecting the sovereignty of Syria, opposed foreign interference with the internal affairs of other nations, and stressed the importance to de-escalate tensions.
- Israel: Prime Minister Benjamin Netanyahu strongly asserted Israel's support to the Druze factions and ordered strikes on Syria, further stating that Israel was committed to the demilitarization policy regarding southern Syria. Defense Minister Israel Katz announced that the "painful blows have begun".
- Iraq: The Ministry of Foreign Affairs expressed strong condemnations of the airstrikes, stressed the importance of de-escalation of the conflicts, and called on the international community to contribute to regional security.
- Jordan: The Ministry of Foreign Affairs condemned the airstrikes. The spokesperson of the ministry, Sufian Kudah, called for an immediate halt of the airstrikes and expressed its support for Syria's security, stability, and territorial integrity.
- Kuwait: The Ministry of Foreign Affairs condemned the Israeli airstrikes, referring it as a "sinful aggression". It also supports Syria in preserving its security, stability, and sovereignty.
- Lebanon: President Joseph Aoun condemned the airstrikes as a threat regional security and called on the international community to exert all possible pressure to halt them and respect Syria's sovereignty and territorial integrity. Prime Minister Nawaf Salam also denounced the Israeli airstrikes as a clear breach of Syria's sovereignty and international law.
- Qatar: Qatar expressed concerns over the tensions in Syria and called for accountability over civilian losses. Qatar further condemned the Israeli strikes and expressed full support for the territorial integrity of Syria.
- Syria: President Ahmed al-Sharaa strongly condemned the airstrikes as "wide-scale targeting of civilian and government facilities" and accused Israel of seeking to sow "chaos" in Syria. The foreign ministry said that Israel's "flagrant assault, which forms part of a deliberate policy pursued by the Israeli entity to inflame tensions, spread chaos, and undermine security and stability in Syria, constitutes a blatant violation of the United Nations Charter and international humanitarian law".
- Turkey: The foreign ministry condemned the attack as an "act of sabotage" against Syria's attempts to achieve peace and stability.
- United Arab Emirates: The UAE "firmly denounced" the Israeli strikes in Damascus and rejected any violations of Syria's sovereignty, security, and stability.
- United Kingdom: British Special Envoy to Syria, Anna Snow, called for de-escalation in southern Syria, expressing deep concern, she stated that the situation is being closely monitored and urged all parties within Syria to calm tensions and take immediate steps to ensure the protection of civilians.
- United States: The U.S. State Department condemned the strikes and said it "did not support Israel's recent action in Syria." Secretary of State Marco Rubio said he was "very concerned" about the escalation, calling it a "misunderstanding."

=== Non-state actors ===
- Hamas: Hamas issued a statement expressing full solidarity with Syria and described the Israeli attacks as a "blatant violation of international laws" and called for a strong response to confront them. Hamas condemned what it called the "heinous Zionist aggression against the Syrian Arab Republic which led to the martyrdom of dozens from the army, security forces, and innocent civilians".
- Hezbollah: Hezbollah condemned the Israeli strikes, describing them as against international law, and expressed its support for the people of Syria.

=== Intergovernmental organizations ===
- United Nations: Secretary-General António Guterres condemned Israel's "escalatory" airstrikes.
- European Union: The EU urged de-escalation and the implementation of the 15 July ceasefire, expressing its concern over civilian security as well as calls for the respect of Syria's sovereignty and integrity.
- Arab League: The General Secretariat of the Arab League strongly condemned the Israeli airstrikes on Syria, describing them as a blatant violation of the sovereignty of a fellow Arab League and UN member state and a clear breach of international law. It characterized the airstrikes as acts of "bullying" that must not be tolerated by the international community.
- Gulf Cooperation Council: The GCC strongly condemned Israeli attacks on Syria.
