= 1973 Syrian General Staff Headquarters raid =

1973 airstrike during the Yom Kippur War

Coordinates: 33°30′50″N 36°16′43″E

Syrian GHQ Raid
- Part of the Yom Kippur War
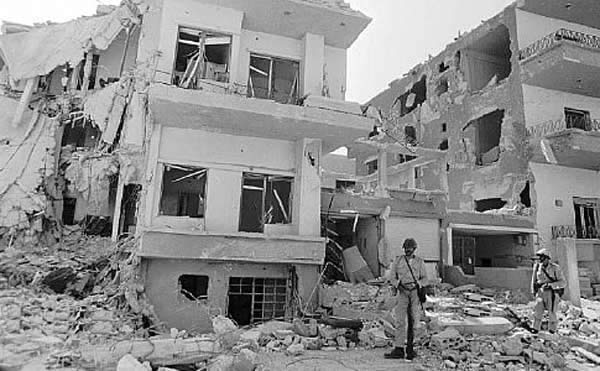
- Syrian soldiers stand guard in the aftermath of the strike
Date	9 October 1973
Location	Damascus
Result	Israeli victory: Syrian GHQ destroyed

Belligerents
Israel	Syria

Commanders and leaders
Benny Peled; Arnon Lavoshin (Lapidot)	Adam Abdallah (executed); Marouan Abbad

Strength
7 F-4 Phantom II	Unknown

Casualties and losses
1 killed 1 captured	Unknown number of military casualties, 26–30 civilians killed, 117 injured

The 1973 Syrian General Staff Headquarters Raid was an aerial strike carried out by the Israeli Air Force on October 9, 1973, the fourth day of the Yom Kippur War. Following a strike by Syrian surface-to-surface missiles against settlements and installations in northern Israel, seven F-4 Phantom IIs from 119 Squadron attacked the Syrian General Staff Headquarters (GHQ) and adjacent buildings in downtown Damascus.

== Background ==
The Israeli Air Force (IAF) had entered the Yom Kippur War confident that it could deal with the threats posed by enemy air defences and be able to provide Israeli ground forces with essential close air support. When war broke out, however, the desperate situation along the fronts forced the IAF to abandon its plans for the suppression of enemy air defences, and concentrate its efforts on halting Egyptian and Syrian advances. The comprehensive Arab air defences systems subsequently exacted a heavy toll from the IAF, with some 50 aircraft, 15 percent of its frontline force, lost on the first two days of the war. The worst blow had come on the second day, October 7, 1973, when six F-4 Phantoms were lost during Operation Doogman 5, a failed attempt to neutralize Syrian air defence on the Golan Heights. Israeli efforts nevertheless succeeded in turning the tide, especially in the north, where on October 8 Syrian advances were halted.

At 03:35 on October 9, Syrian FROG-7 artillery rockets struck Israel's northern air base at Ramat David, killing one pilot and injuring several soldiers. Additional rockets struck civilian settlements nearby, including Migdal HaEmek and Kibbutz Gvat. The Israeli government decided to retaliate fiercely for the Syrian FROG attack, both to deter future strikes and to disrupt Syrian war efforts. The IAF was to destroy the infrastructure on which Syria's war-making capacity depended, targeting strategic targets in Syria such as its oil industry and electricity generating system. The first target was to be the Syrian General Staff Headquarters in the prosperous Abu Rummaneh district of Damascus. The raid was to disrupt Syrian command and control, but would also serve to deter Jordan from joining the war and would prove that despite the blows the IAF had suffered, it would not be deterred from taking the war to Syria.

== Strike ==
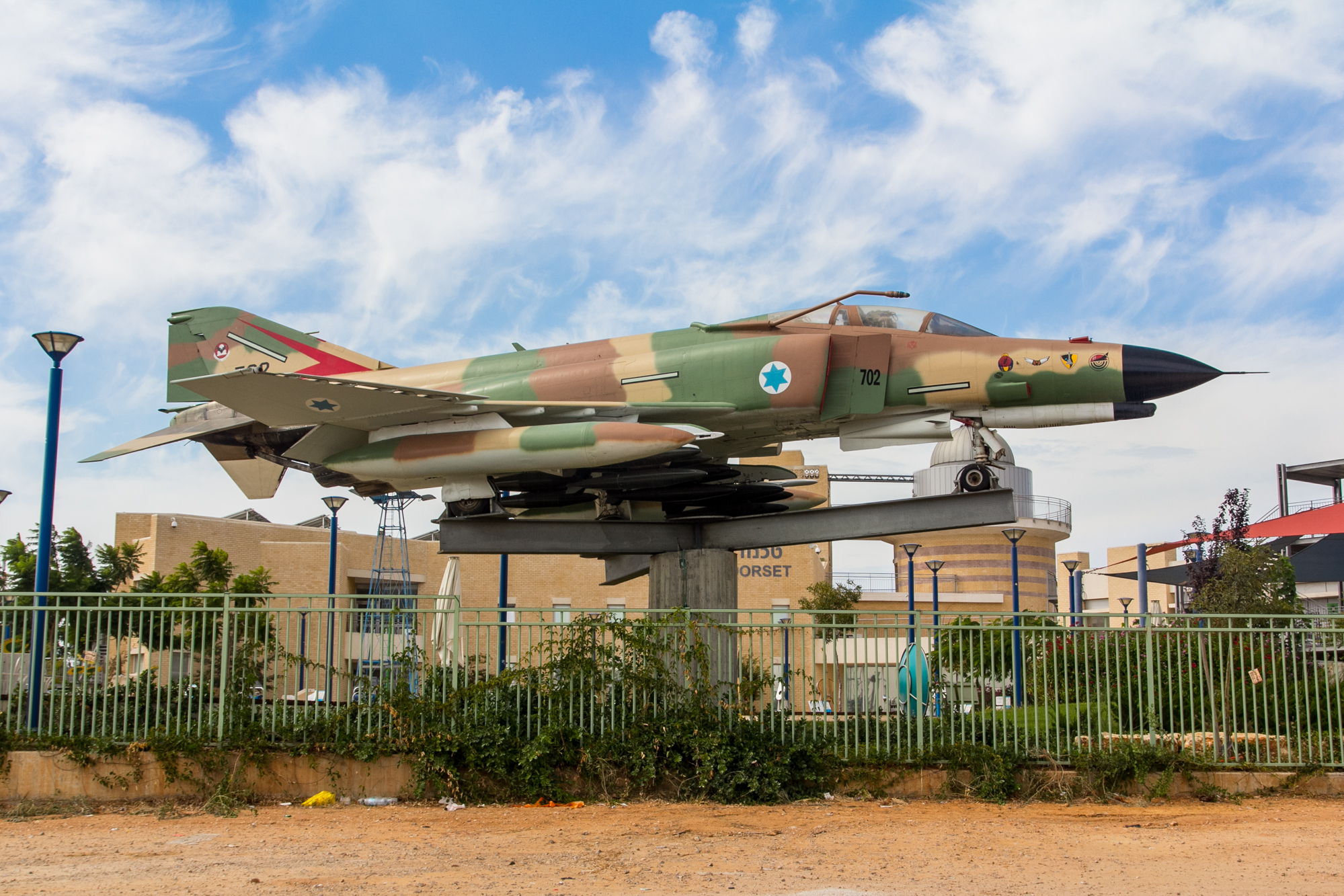
Israeli 119 Squadron F-4E Phantom II

In order to allow IAF aircraft to strike targets inside Syria without overflying the heavily defended regions around the Golan Heights, new attack routes through Lebanon had to be opened. The IAF therefore first attacked the Lebanese radar station at Barouk, which had been linked to the Syrian air defence network and was capable of supplying Syrian defenders with advance warning of Israeli strikes.

Three IAF squadrons were assigned the task of attacking the Syrian GHQ in Damascus and each was to contribute 8 F-4E Phantom IIs. Leading the strike would be a formation from 119 "Bat" Squadron, led by squadron deputy CO Arnon Lavoshin (Lapidot). These were to be followed by 107 Squadron Phantoms led by squadron leader Iftach Spector, with a 69 Squadron 8-ship formation coming in last.

Having taken off from their bases in Israel, the three Israeli formations first headed out over the Mediterranean, before turning north towards Lebanon and then east towards Damascus. Shortly after take-off from Tel-Nof, one of the 119 Squadron Phantoms suffered a mechanical fault, forcing it to abort and leaving seven to carry on. Approaching their target, the Phantom formations encountered heavy cloud cover, obscuring their target and making low-altitude approach, essential for the surprise attack, difficult. Commanding the leading formation, Arnon Lavoshin was contemplating calling off the strike, but broke radio silence to inform his formation that they would nevertheless continue. Eventually a break in the clouds over Damascus allowed the Phantoms to see the ground, re-orient themselves and head for their target, catching Syrian air defences off their guard. Only after the first bombs had already struck their targets did the air-raid sirens sound.

One after the other, the seven Phantoms from 119 Squadron released their bomb loads. The top floors of the Syrian GHQ were hit, as were the adjacent Syrian Air Force headquarters, a nearby TV station, a Soviet cultural center and several other structures in the city's diplomatic quarter. Having arrived unchallenged, the Israeli aircraft extricating themselves were now engaged by the dense air defence array guarding Damascus. Two aircraft were hit. One Phantom was downed outright, killing pilot Captain Dov Shafir. His navigator, Lieutenant Yaakov Yaakobi, fell into Syrian captivity where he was beaten and tortured. Another aircraft was heavily damaged and suffered an engine fire, yet its pilot, Major Omri Afek, managed to bring it to a safe landing in Ramat David.

Unlike Lavoshin's formation, the eight 107 Squadron Phantoms from Hatzerim were flying a slightly different route to the target. These failed to spot any opening in the cloud cover over the target and therefore requested an alternate target. The Phantoms were diverted to bomb Syrian armor near Hushniyah, on the Golan Heights. Their strike decimated a tank column and allowed Israeli forces to push Syrian forces back over the pre-war ceasefire lines. The trailing 69 Squadron aircraft, having heard the 107 strike called off, returned to base after dumping their bombs and excess fuel in the Mediterranean, a decision which would later lead to much criticism from fellow pilots.

== Aftermath ==
Syria reported 26 civilians were killed in the strike and 117 injured, while the Soviet Union reported 30 people killed in its cultural center. Among the dead were several foreign diplomats. The collateral damage caused by the strike earned Israel a sharp rebuke from the international community, with the Soviet ambassador to the United Nations condemning the raid as "barbaric". Syria claimed its air defences had shot down four of the attacking aircraft.

The raid on the Syrian GHQ, as well as on other strategic targets, nevertheless prompted Syria to withdraw air defence assets from the front in order to protect its high-value assets, thereby thinning front line defences. Both the Syrian GHQ and Air Force headquarters were forced to relocate. Israeli POWs returning after the war revealed that several airmen had been held in the bowels of the air force command center at the time of the strike and that the Syrians had later questioned them about how the IAF had known to avoid hitting their quarters.

Major Arnon Lavoshin was awarded the Medal of Distinguished Service, Israel's third-highest wartime decoration, for leading the raid. His navigator, Lieutenant Elazar Lior, received an IDF Chief-of-Staff citation. Major Afek, leading 119's second four-ship formation, was also awarded the Medal of Distinguished Service for his role in the raid and for nursing his stricken aircraft to a safe landing, as well as for several other undertakings later in the war.

== See also ==
- Shimshon Rozen

== Bibliography ==
- Aloni, Shlomo (2004). Israeli Phantom II Aces. Osprey Publishing. ISBN 1-84176-783-2.
- Cohen, Eliezer (1995). Israel's Best Defence. Random House Value Publishing. ISBN 978-0-517-13789-5.
- Dunstan, Simon (2003). The Yom Kippur War 1973 (1): The Golan Heights. Campaign. Vol. 118. Osprey Publishing. ISBN 978-1-84176-220-3.
- Nicolle, David; Cooper, Tom (2004). Arab MiG-19 and MiG-21 Units in Combat. Combat Aircraft. UK: Osprey. ISBN 978-1-84176-655-3.
- Nordeen, Lon (1990). Fighters Over Israel. New York: Orion Books. ISBN 0-517-56603-6.
- Norton, Bill (2004). Air War on the Edge – A History of the Israel Air Force and its Aircraft since 1947. Midland Publishing. ISBN 1-85780-088-5.
- Spector, Iftach (2008). Loud and Clear (in Hebrew). Yediot Ahronot.
- Yonay, Ehud (1993). No Margin for Error: the Making of the Israeli Air Force. Pantheon Books. ISBN 978-0-679-41563-3.
