= Abdul Karim Mahmoud Ibrahim =

Syrian military officer

Lieutenant General Abdul Karim Mahmoud Ibrahim
- عبد الكريم محمود إبراهيم
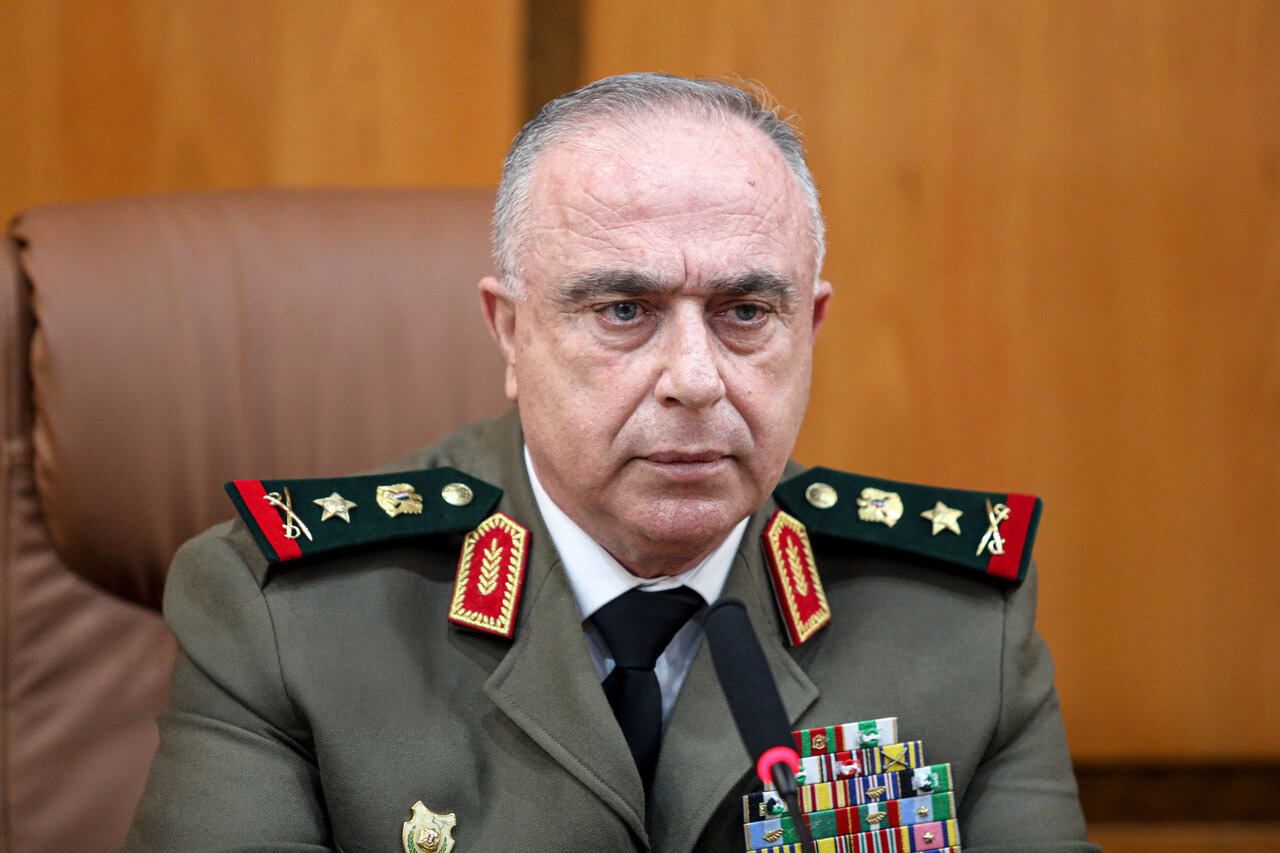
- Ibrahim in 2023

Chief of the General Staff
- In office 30 April 2022 – 8 December 2024
- President: Bashar al-Assad
- Prime Minister: Hussein Arnous (2022–2024); Mohammad Ghazi al-Jalali (2024)
- Preceded by: Salim Harba
- Succeeded by: Ali Noureddine al-Naasan

Personal details
- Born: October 5, 1963 (age 62) Tartus, Syria

Military service
- Allegiance: Ba'athist Syria
- Branch/service: Syrian Arab Army
- Years of service: 1984–2024
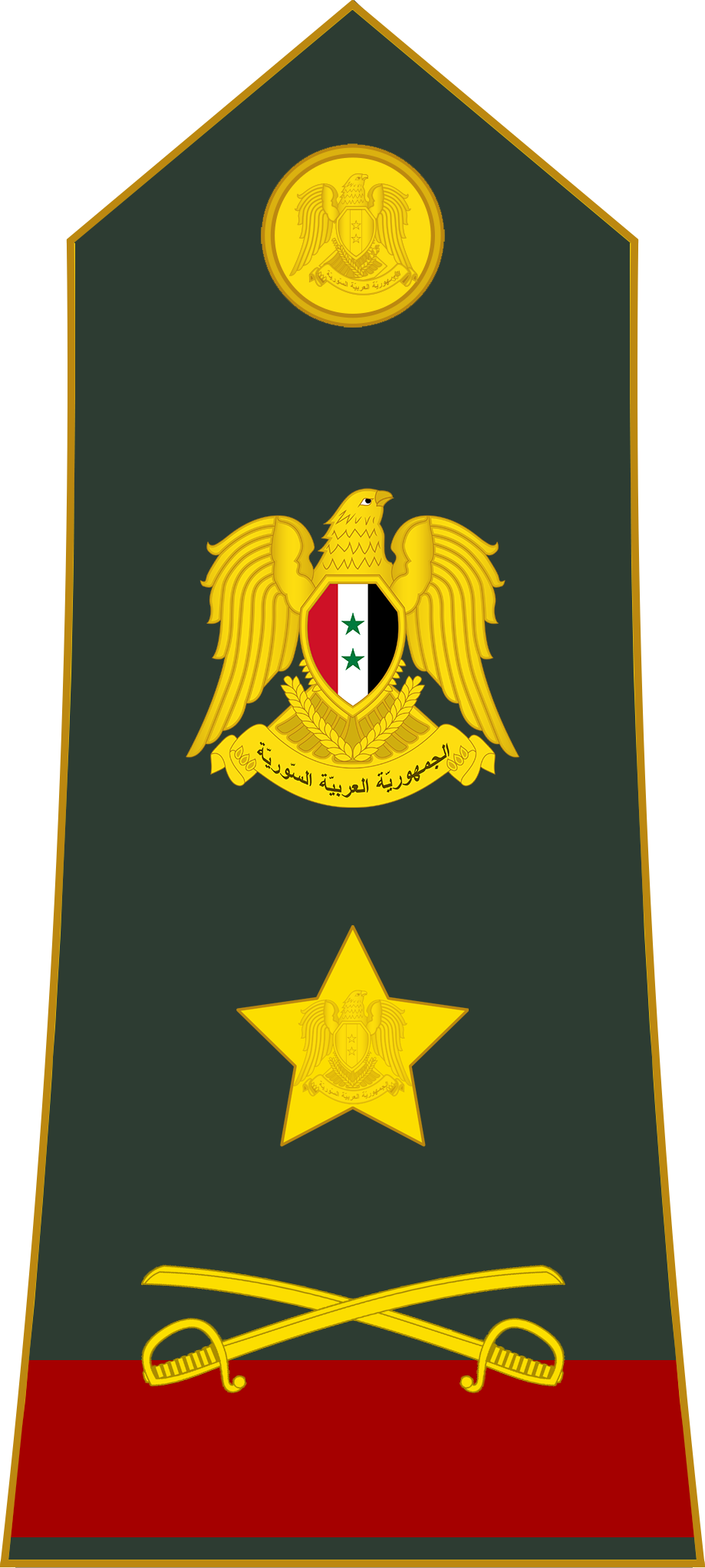
- Rank: Lieutenant general
- Commands: Syrian Arab Armed Forces
- Battles/wars: Syrian civil war; 2024 Syrian offensives; 2024 Hama offensive

Abdul Karim Mahmoud Ibrahim (Arabic: عبد الكريم محمود إبراهيم; born October 5, 1963) is a Syrian military officer who served as the Chief of the General Staff of the Syrian Army and Armed Forces from 2022 to 2024.

== Biography ==
Ibrahim is a native of Tartus Governorate, Syria. He was appointed as Chief of the General Staff on 30 April 2022, a position that has operational command over the country's ground, air, and naval forces.

In the fall of 2023, Ibrahim ordered the strengthening of the Syrian military defenses in northern Syria, near Idlib Governorate, which was controlled by Syrian opposition forces.

On 18 November 2024, Ibrahim met the Iranian Minister of Defense, Aziz Nasirzadeh, in Damascus.

There were reports on 1 December 2024 that Ibrahim was sent to Hama to oversee the military operations against the rebels during their 2024 Hama offensive, after the Syrian Ministry of Defense sent reinforcements to the region.

Following the Fall of the Assad regime, he was among the top Syrian military officials who fled Damascus on 8 December 2024 aboard a Syrian Air Yak-40 jet to the Russian-controlled Hmeimim Air Base, before being flown onward to Moscow under Russian military protection.
