= Syrian Armed Forces =

Combined military forces of Syria

- القُوَّاتُ المُسَلَّحَةُ السُورِيَّةُ
- Emblem of the Syrian Armed Forces

- Flag of the Syrian Armed Forces
- Founded: 1943; 83 years ago
- Current form: December 2024; 1 year ago
- Service branches: Syrian Army; Syrian Air Force; Syrian Navy
- Headquarters: Hay'at al-Arkan, Umayyad Square, Damascus

Leadership
- Commander-in-chief: President Ahmed al-Sharaa
- Minister of Defence: Murhaf Abu Qasra
- Chief of the General Staff: Ali Noureddine al-Naasan

Personnel
- Military age: 18
- Conscription: Inactive, discontinued
- Active personnel: ~180,000–182,000

Industry
- Foreign suppliers: Turkey; Qatar; Saudi Arabia; Russia; United States; Ukraine

Related articles
- History: Military history of Syria
- Ranks: Military ranks of Syria

The Syrian Armed Forces (Arabic: القُوَّاتُ المُسَلَّحَةُ السُورِيَّةُ, romanized: al-Quwwāt al-Musallaḥah as-Sūrīyyah) are the military forces of Syria. They consist of the Syrian Army, Syrian Air Force and Syrian Navy. According to Article 32 of the Constitutional Declaration of the Syrian Arab Republic, the President of Syria serves as the commander-in-chief of the Army and the Armed Forces.

After 1943, the Syrian Army played a major role in Syria's governance, mounting six military coups: two in 1949, including the March 1949 Syrian coup d'état and the August 1949 coup by Colonel Sami al-Hinnawi, and one each in 1951, 1954, 1963, 1966, and 1970. It fought four wars with Israel (1948, the Six-Day War in 1967, the 1973 Arab-Israel War, and 1982 Lebanon War) and one with Jordan ("Black September" in Jordan, 1970). The Air Force and Navy acted more as adjuncts to the army than independent actors, apart from the Air Force/ADF's reaction to the Israeli Operation Mole Cricket 19 ahead of the 1982 Lebanon War. Syrian fighters and air defence systems took very heavy losses. An armoured division was also deployed to Saudi Arabia in 1990–91 during the Gulf War, but saw little action. From 1976 to 2005 the Army was the major pillar of the Syrian occupation of Lebanon. Internally, it played a major part in suppressing the 1979–82 Islamist uprising in Syria, and from 2011 to 2024 was heavily engaged in fighting the Syrian civil war, the most violent and prolonged war the Syrian Army had taken part in since its establishment in the 1940s.

Prior to the fall of Ba'athist Syria, the Syrian Arab Armed Forces used conscription. Males served in the military from age 18, but they were exempted from service if they did not have a brother who could take care of their parents. Females were exempt from conscription.

The Ba'athist Syrian Arab Armed Forces collapsed in 2024 with the fall of the Assad regime and flight of Bashar al-Assad. Up until the fall of Bashar al-Assad's Ba'ath Party regime in December 2024, the Syrian Arab Armed Forces were the state armed forces. They consisted of the Syrian Army, Syrian Arab Air Force, Syrian Arab Navy, Syrian Arab Air Defence Force, and paramilitary forces, such as the National Defence Forces. According to the 2012 Constitution of Ba'athist Syria, the President of Syria was the Commander-in-chief of the Armed Forces, with the Minister of Defense holding the position of Deputy Commander-in-Chief of the Army and Armed Forces.

After the fall of the Assad regime, the Syrian transitional government made preparations to reorganise Syria's military forces. On 21 December 2024, it was reported that Murhaf Abu Qasra had been appointed the new defence minister for the interim government, while Ali Noureddine al-Naasan serves as Chief of the General Staff. On 25 August 2026, the Syrian Democratic Forces (SDF) formally dissolved and integrated into the national military apparatus, incorporating an estimated 10,000 to 12,000 active combatants into state defense units and bringing the active total strength of the Syrian Armed Forces to between 180,000 and 182,000 personnel.

== History ==
=== Mandate and independence (1923–1945) ===
The French Mandate volunteer force, which would later become the Syrian army, was established in 1923 with the threat of Syrian Arab nationalism in mind. Although the unit's officers were originally all French, it was, in effect, the first indigenous modern Syrian army. In 1925, this force was expanded and designated the Special Troops of the Levant (Troupes Spéciales du Levant). In 1941, during the Second World War, the Army of the Levant participated in a futile resistance to the Syria–Lebanon Campaign, the British and Free French invasion that ousted the Vichy French from Syria.

After the Allied takeover, the army came under the control of the Free French and was designated the Levantine Forces (Troupes du Levant). French Mandate authorities maintained a gendarmerie to police Syria's vast rural areas. This paramilitary force was used to combat criminals and political foes of the Mandate government. As with the Levantine Special Troops, French officers held the top posts, but as Syrian independence approached, the ranks below major were gradually filled by Syrian officers who had graduated from the Homs Military Academy, which had been established by the French during the 1930s. In 1938, the Troupes Spéciales numbered around 10,000 men and 306 officers (of whom 88 were French, mainly in the higher ranks). A majority of the Syrian troops were of rural background and minority ethnic origin, mainly Alawites, Druze, Kurds, Circassians and Bosniaks. By the end of 1945, the army numbered about 5,000 and the gendarmerie some 3,500. In April 1946, the last French officers were forced to leave Syria due to sustained resistance offensives; the Levantine Forces then became the regular armed forces of the newly independent state and grew rapidly to about 12,000 by the time of the 1948 Arab−Israeli War, the first of four Arab−Israeli wars involving Syria between 1948 and 1986.

=== First and Second Republic (1946–1963) ===
Flag of the Syrian Republic (1932–1958), and again from 1961 to 1963

Flag of the Armed Forces of the United Arab Republic (1958–1961)

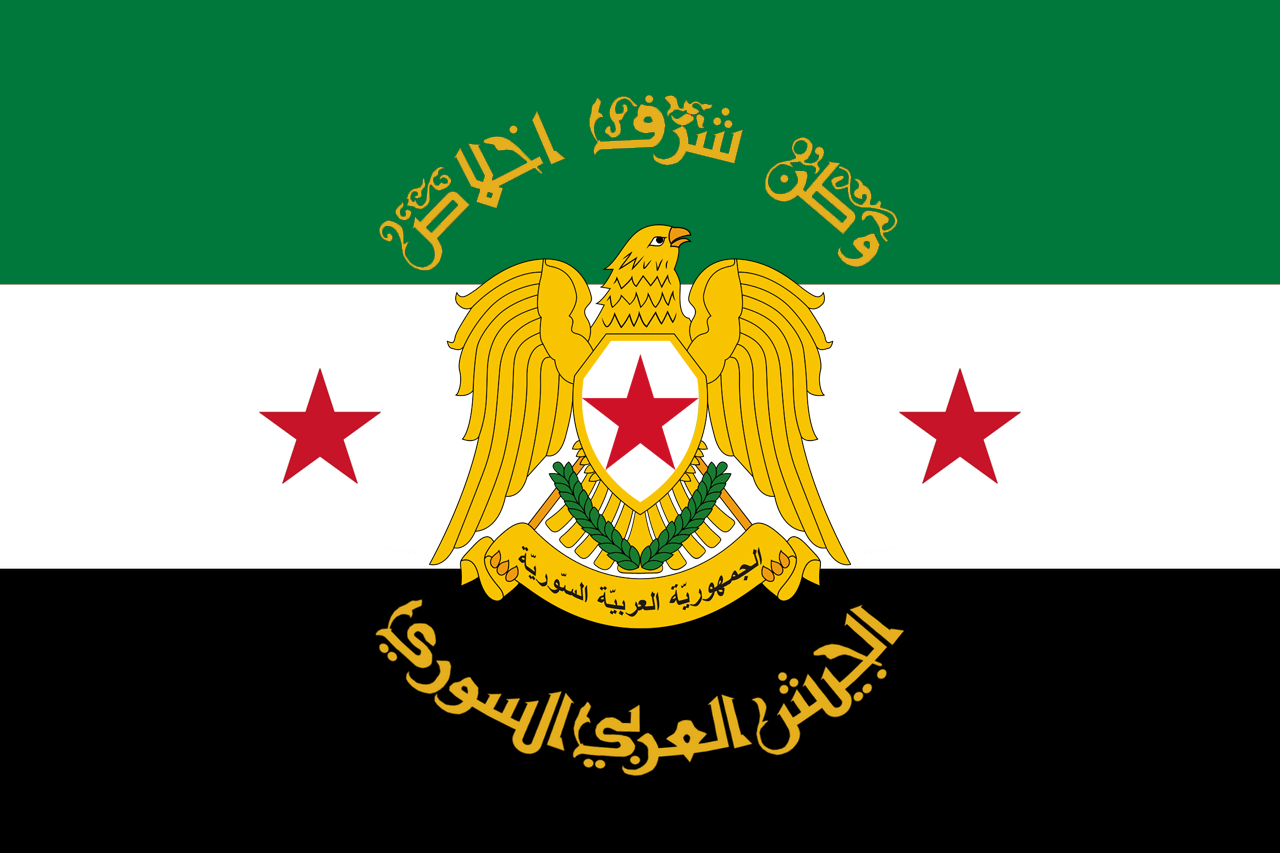
Flag of the Syrian Arab Armed Forces (1961–1963)

The Syrian Armed Forces fought in the 1948 Arab–Israeli War and were involved in some military coups. Between 1948 and 1967, a series of coups destroyed the stability of the government and any remaining professionalism within the armed forces. In March 1949, the chief of staff, Gen. Husni al-Za'im, installed himself as president. Two more military dictators followed by December 1949. Gen. Adib Shishakli then held power until deposed in the 1954 Syrian coup d'état. Further coups followed, each attended by a purge of the officer corps to remove supporters of the losers from the force.

The Syrian armed forces were part of the Armed Forces of the United Arab Republic between 1958 and 1961. Some Syrian ground forces formed the First Army (United Arab Republic) while the Second and Third Armies were established by the Egyptian half of the unified state.

==== Ba'athist Syria (1963–2024) ====
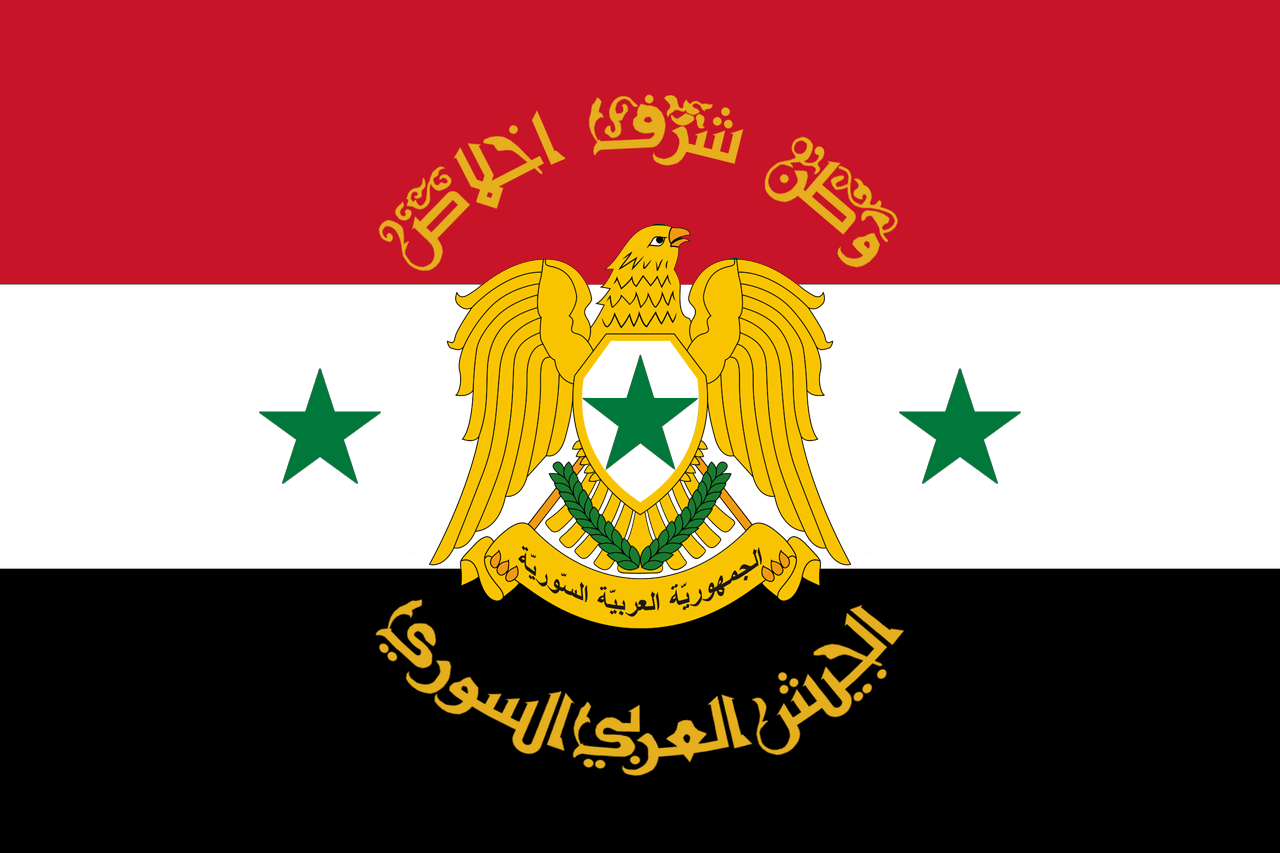
Flag of the Syrian Arab Armed Forces (1963–1972)

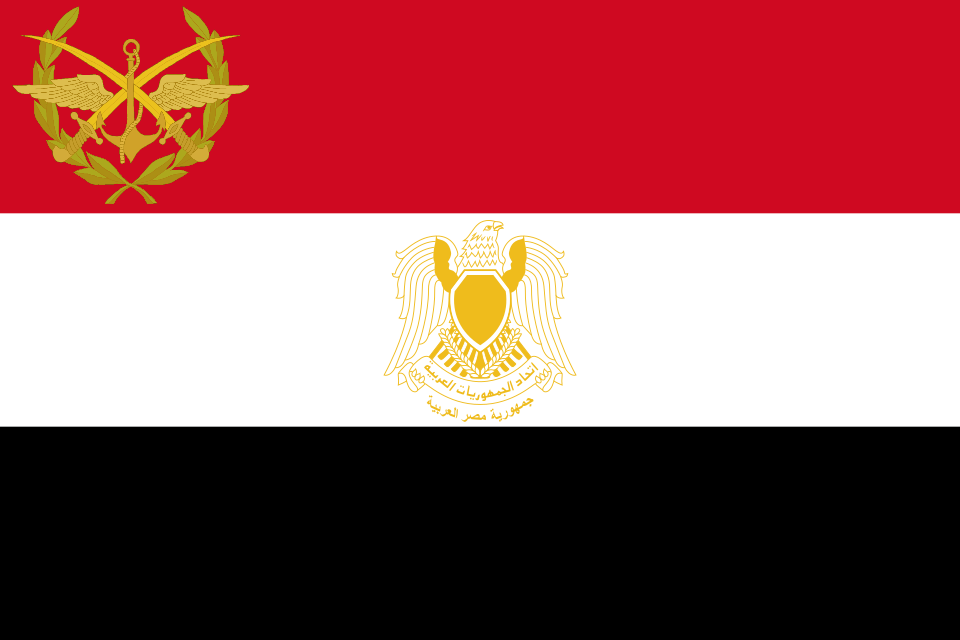
Flag of the Syrian Arab Armed Forces (1972–1980), used during Syria's membership in the Federation of Arab Republics

Flag of the Syrian Arab Armed Forces (1980–2024)

In 1963, the Military Committee of the Syrian Regional Command of the Ba'ath Party spent most of its time planning to take power through a conventional military coup. From the very beginning, the Military Committee knew it had to capture al-Kiswah and Qatana, two military camps and seize control of the 70th Armored Brigade at al-Kiswah, the Military Academy in the city of Homs and the Damascus radio station. While the conspirators of the Military Committee were all young, their aim was not out of reach; the sitting regime had been slowly disintegrating and the traditional elite had lost effective political power over the country. A small group of military officers, including Hafez al-Assad, seized control in the March 1963 Syrian coup d'état. Following the coup, Gen. Amin al-Hafiz discharged many ranking Sunni officers, thereby, Stratfor says, "providing openings for hundreds of Alawites to fill top-tier military positions during the 1963–1965 period on the grounds of being opposed to Arab unity. This measure tipped the balance in favor of Alawite officers who staged a coup in 1966 and, for the first time, placed Damascus in the hands of the Alawites."

The Armed Forces were involved in the 1967 Six-Day War. Since 1967, most of the Golan Heights territory of southwestern Syria has been under Israeli occupation. They then fought in the late 1960s War of Attrition and the 1970 Black September invasion of Jordan.

When Hafez al-Assad came to power in 1971, the army began to modernize and change. In the first 10 years of Assad's rule, the army increased by 162%, and by 264% by 2000. At one point, 70% of the country's annual budget spend only to the army. At the beginning of the 1973 Arab-Israel War, the Syrian Army launched an attack to seize the Golan Heights that was only narrowly repulsed by two vastly outnumbered Israeli brigades. Since 1973 the cease-fire line has been respected by both sides, with very few incidents until the Syrian civil war.

Syria was invited into Lebanon by that country's president in 1976, to intervene on the side of the Lebanese government against PLO guerilla and Lebanese Christian forces. The Arab Deterrent Force originally consisted of a Syrian core, up to 25,000 troops, with participation by some other Arab League states totaling only around 5,000 troops. In late 1978, after the Arab League had extended the mandate of the Arab Deterrent Force, the Sudanese, the Saudis and the United Arab Emirates announced intentions to withdraw troops from Lebanon, extending their stay into the early months of 1979 at the Lebanese government's request. The Libyan troops were abandoned, and the ADF thereby became a purely Syrian force (which did include the Palestine Liberation Army (PLA)).

A year after Israel invaded and occupied Southern Lebanon during the 1982 Lebanon War, the Lebanese government failed to extend the ADF's mandate, thereby effectively ending its existence, although not the Syrian or Israeli military presence in Lebanon. Eventually the Syrian presence became known as the Syrian occupation of Lebanon.

==== Occupation of Lebanon (1982–2005) ====
Syrian forces, still technically known as the Arab Deterrent Force, lingered in Lebanon throughout the Lebanese civil war (1975–90). Eventually, the Syrians brought most of the nation under their control as part of a power struggle with Israel, which had occupied areas of southern Lebanon in 1978. In 1985, Israel began to withdraw from Lebanon, as a result of domestic opposition to Israel and international pressure. In the aftermath of this withdrawal, the War of the Camps broke out, with Syria fighting their former Palestinian allies. Following the end of the Lebanese civil war in 1990, the Syrian occupation of Lebanon continued until they were also forced out by widespread public protest and international pressure. About 20,000 Syrian soldiers were deployed in Lebanon until 27 April 2005, when the last of Syria's troops left the country. Syrian forces were accused of involvement in the murder of Rafiq al-Hariri, as well as continued meddling in Lebanese affairs, and an international investigation into the Hariri killing and several subsequent bomb attacks has been launched by the UN.

==== Other engagements ====
Engagements since 1979 included the Islamist uprising in Syria (1979–82), notably including the Hama massacre, the 1982 Lebanon War and the dispatch of the 9th Armored Division to Saudi Arabia in 1990–91, ahead of the Gulf War against Iraq. The 9th Armored Division served as the Arab Joint Forces Command North reserve and saw little action. Syria's force numbered ~20,000 in strength (the sixth-largest contingent) and its involvement was justified domestically as an effort to defend Saudi Arabia. Syria's initial involvement in Operation Desert Shield also rolled into the Allied Operation Desert Storm, as Syrian forces did participate in helping dislodge and drive Iraqi forces out of Kuwait City. The total losses sustained were two dead and one wounded. There were indications the Syrian government had been prepared to double its force to 40,000.

==== Modernisation during the 2000s ====
During the 2000s, Syria relied on Russian arms purchases to acquire modern weapons. Those purchases included anti-tank and air defense systems. In early September 2008 the Syrian government ordered Mikoyan MiG-29SMT fighters, Pantsir S1E air-defence systems, Iskander tactical missile systems, Yak-130 aircraft, and two Amur-1650 submarines from Russia. Russia's Foreign Minister Sergey Lavrov asserted that the sale wouldn't upset the balance of power in the Middle East and was "in line with ... international law."

At the same time, Russia sought to transform its naval facility in Tartus into a permanent base. Israel and the United States opposed further arms sales to Syria, fearing that the weapons could fall under the control of Iran or Hezbollah fighters in Lebanon.

==== Syrian civil war (2011–2024) ====
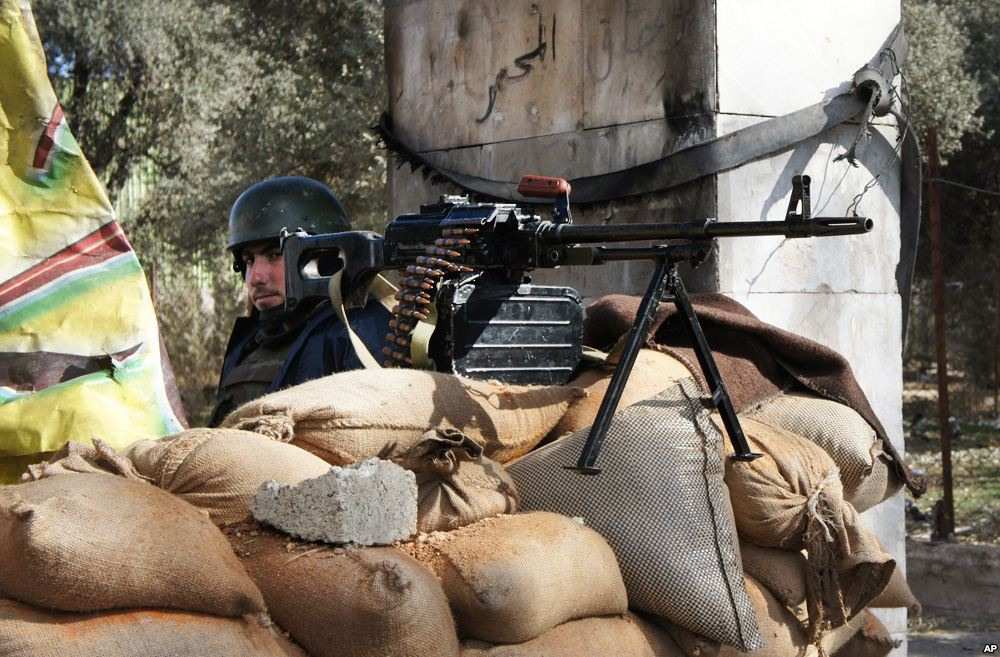
A Syrian soldier manning a checkpoint near Damascus.

Because of the violence against the people by the Syrian Army and the detention of a great number of people, some soldiers from different religions and sects (Sunni, Shia, Druze and Christian) defected in protest at orders to kill protesters in April 2011. By 2014, the number of defecting officers had reached approximately 170,000, from different ranks. They formed the Free Syrian Army on 29 July 2011 and at the beginning of the conflict they depended on light weapons. The arming of the Free Syrian Army began in mid-2012.

In March 2012 the Syrian government issued new travel restrictions for military-aged males. Under the new restrictions, reported by local Syrian news outlets, all males between 18 and 42 were banned from traveling outside the country. In a late June 2012 interview given by the FSA's Asharq Al-Awsat he claimed Riad al-Asaad said that about 20–30 Syrian officers defected to Turkey each day.

On 18 July 2012 the Syrian Defense Minister Dawoud Rajha, former defense minister Hasan Turkmani and the president's brother-in-law Gen. Assef Shawkat were killed in a bomb attack in Damascus. Syrian intelligence chief Hisham Bekhityar and Head of the 4th Army Division Maher Al Assad – brother of President Assad – were also injured in the explosion.

Since the start of the conflict in Syria, human rights groups say that the majority of abuses were committed by the Syrian government's forces, and UN investigations concluded that the government's abuses were the greatest in both gravity and scale. The branches of the Syrian Armed Forces that committed war crimes include at least the Syrian Arab Army, Syrian Arab Air Force and the Syrian Military Intelligence. However the Syrian authorities denied these accusations and claimed that irregular armed groups with foreign support are behind the atrocities, including Al Qaeda linked Insurgents.

The numbers in the Syrian armed forces had reduced considerably during the Civil War, although estimates varied.

Syrian Armed Forces size during the Civil War
Year	Army personnel	Air Force personnel	Total: Army + Air Force
2011	220,000	100,000	320,000
2014	110,000	63,000	173,000

In 2014, Gazeta.ru reported that the regular army had reduced from 325,000 to 150,000 due to "mortality, desertions and deviations", but that this was supplemented by 60,000 Republican Guards and 50,000 Kurdish militias. In 2015, LifeNews still reported the same figures.

Despite shrinking by nearly half from the 2011 beginning of the civil war by 2014, the Armed Forces became much more flexible and capable, especially in anti-guerilla warfare. Their modus operandi switched from traditional Soviet-modeled conventional military forces into a force of smaller groups fighting in close-quarters guerrilla combat with an increasing role for junior officers.

In September 2018, Statista Charts estimated that the Syrian military had lost 111 warplanes since the beginning of the civil war, including reconnaissance and attack drones. The Syrians lost most of their warplanes during the first four years of the war, with losses significantly decreasing after the Russian intervention into the war. After the civil war Bashar Al-Assad made little efforts to rehabilitate the military from the losses sustained during the civil war. This was most likely not due to a lack of resources, but instead it was an active choice of the regime. This left the military weakened and suspectable to attacks, such as from Israel.

=== Syrian transitional government (2024–present) ===
In December 2024, the Syrian Arab Army, alongside the Syrian Arab Republic itself, collapsed as the Assad regime fell. Some of the remaining Assad regime forces crossed into Iraq, others removed their uniforms before the rebels could arrive in Damascus, the last remaining territory controlled by the SAR. Retired U.S. General Wesley Clark said that a video showing Assad's forces evacuating to Iraq showed the "demoralization and collapse of an army", and that the forces knew they would lose, with the rebels taking Damascus and Assad's whereabouts unknown. He compared it to the fall of Kabul in 2021, where the U.S.-backed Afghan Armed Forces collapsed, and that when faced with certain defeat, armies simply "melt away".

As of 11 December 2024, leaders of the Syrian Democratic Forces, the military forces of the Autonomous Administration of North and East Syria, were preparing for "negotiations that would create a broader-based Syrian government that is not under al-Sharaa's control". Leaders of the Southern Operations Room met with al-Sharaa on 11 December and expressed interest in "coordination", a "unified effort" and "cooperation", without stating that they would support the HTS transitional government.

On 17 December 2024, Prime Minister Mohammed Al-Bashir has said the defense ministry would be restructured using former rebel factions and officers who defected from Assad's army. Murhaf Abu Qasra (nom de guerre; Abu Hassan al-Hamawi), the military commander of Hay'at Tahrir al-Sham said to The Economist, "All military units will naturally transition to the ministry of defence, forming a unified army tasked with protecting the nation on behalf of all Syrians." The Economist added that Qasra insisted "..that there will be no place in the new Syria for jihadists eager to launch attacks". Abu Qasra, speaking with AFP, said that HTS would be "among the first to take the initiative" to dissolve its armed wing for a national army; on 21 December it was reported that Abu Qasra was appointed transitional Minister of Defense.

On 22 December 2024, Ahmed al-Sharaa said that the new Syrian government would announce the new structure of the Syrian military within days. Two days later, the transitional government announced that a meeting between opposition groups and Ahmed al-Sharaa "ended in an agreement on the dissolution of all the groups and their integration under the supervision of the ministry of defence".

On 26 December 2024, the "former forces of deposed leader Bashar al-Assad" killed 14 HTS fighters in the process of the new government capturing Mohammad Kanjo Hassan. General Hassan, the former chief of military justice and head of the field court, had been closely associated with the Sednaya Prison, where detainees had been often been brutally tortured. This has led to the Western Syria clashes against the Syrian transitional government.

On 29 December 2024, Ahmed al-Sharaa announced the promotion of 42 individuals to the rank of Colonel, 5 to the rank of Brigadier General, and 2 to the rank of Major-General in the Syrian Army. This number included Defense Minister Abu Qasra and new Chief of the General Staff of the Syrian Armed Forces and Army Ali Noureddine Al-Naasan, who were both elevated to the rank of Major-General. In January 2025 the defense ministry said that it has met with over 60 armed groups and claimed that all of the armed groups agreed to be a part of the armed forces and reorganized into units. but they reject the SDF proposal of creating a Kurdish "bloc" within the armed forces. Later in February the SDF, the Democratic Autonomous Administration of North and East Syria (DAANES), and the Syrian Democratic Council decided in a meeting that the SDF would merge with the Syrian army.

On 8 March 2025, the Syrian Observatory for Human Rights reported that Syrian security forces and pro-government fighters had been involved in the mass killings of more than 750 Alawite civilians amidst clashes with supposed remaining pro-Assad groups in the western governorates of Syria.

By June 2025, the Syrian transitional government had recruited half of its planned 200,000-man army by uniting various Syrian factions led by Hay'at Tahrir al-Sham, including 30,000 members of the Syrian National Army and 15,000 members of the Syrian Democratic Forces, as well as foreign fighters. Two-thirds of the senior commanders are HTS members. Reuters reported that the US gave the nod to Syria to integrate foreign fighters into its army. On August 2026, it was reported that following their agreement with President Ahmed al-Sharaa’s government, the Kurdish led Syrian Democratic Forces SDF have announced they have formally dissolved as an independent military force, following their integration into the Syrian Armed Forces.

== Structure ==
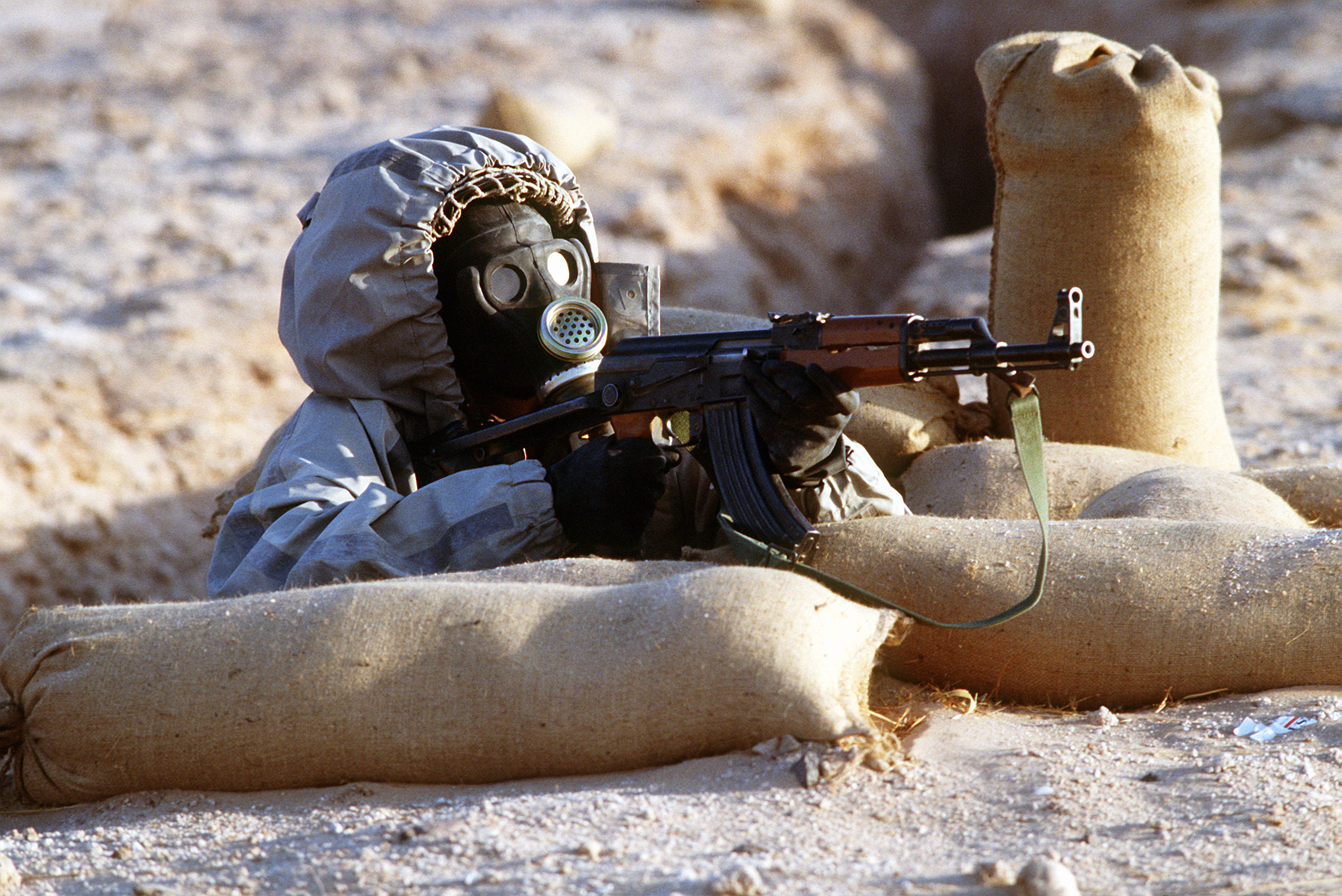
A Syrian soldier aims a Type 56 assault rifle from a foxhole during a military activity demonstration in Saudi Arabia in 1990. The soldier is wearing a Soviet-made Model ShMS nuclear-biological-chemical warfare mask.

=== Army ===
The Syrian Army was historically the dominant military service, controlled the seniormost posts in the armed forces, and had approximately 80% of the armed forces' personnel. In 1987 Joshua Sinai wrote that the major recent structural developments were the establishment of a special forces division (the 14th Special Forces Division) and the organization of ground formations into three corps. In 2010, the International Institute for Strategic Studies estimated army regulars or professionals at 220,000, with an additional 280,000 reserves. That figure was unchanged in the 2011 edition of the Military Balance, but in the 2013 edition, during the war, the IISS estimated that army strength was 110,000. By the end of 2018, analysts estimated the army to have just 100,000 combat-ready troops.

After the beginning of the Syrian civil war, Syrian military enlisted strength dropped by over half from a pre-civil war figure of 325,000 to 150,000 soldiers in the army in December 2014 due to casualties, desertions and draft dodging, reaching between 178,000 and 220,000 soldiers in the army, in addition to 80,000 to 100,000 irregular forces. By 2023, the number of active Syrian soldiers had increased to 170,000, but the number of active paramilitary and reserve forces may have decreased by as much as 50,000.

=== Air Force ===
The Syrian Air Force was established in 1948, and first saw action in the 1948 Arab–Israeli War. Under Ba'athist Syria until 2024 it was known as the Syrian Arab Air Force. Land-based air defence systems were grouped under the Syrian Air Defence Force, separate from both the Air Force and the Army. The air force was nearly destroyed by the Israeli Defence Forces in December 2024, following the collapse of the Assad regime and the subsequent Israeli invasion of Syria.

=== Navy ===
The Syrian Navy was established in 1950, with its main objective being to defend the country's coasts and ensure the security of the territorial waters of Syria. It saw action in the 1973 Arab-Israel War and the Syrian civil war.

=== Major officials and units, April 2026 ===
Role/Unit	Name/Commander	Notes
Ministry of Defense
Minister of Defense	Murhaf Abu Qasra	
Chief of Staff	Ali Noureddine al-Naasan	
Deputy Ministers of Defense	Mohammed Khair Hassan Shuaib; Sipan Hamo	
Assistant Minister of Defense for the Northern Region	Fahim Issa	
Spokesperson for the Ministry of Defense	Hassan Abdul Ghani	
Head of Officer Affairs	Mohammed Mansour	
Director of the Armament Directorate	Mohammed Abdul Rahman Al-Sheikh	
Head of Administrative Affairs	Anad al-Darwish	
Committee Official in the Military Operations Department	Abu Ubaydah al-Shami	
Head of the Medical Administration	Ahmed al-Youssef	
Director of the Higher Military Academy	Fadlallah al-Haji	
Armed Forces
Latakia
400th Division		
56th Reserve Division	Tariq Solaq	
1st Coastal Division	Muhammad Haj Ali	
Aleppo
80th Division	Ahmed Rizk	
76th Division	Sayf Bulad	
72nd Division	Doghan Suleiman	
60th Aleppo Division		
Hama
82nd Division	Khaled Al-Halabi Abu Khattab	
74th Division	Jamil al-Saleh	
60th Division	Fadi Zouda	
Daraa
40th Division	Binyan al-Hariri	
Damascus
77th Division	Sheikh Abu Adnan al-Zabadani	
70th Division	Essam al-Buwaydhani	
Damascus Division	Omar Mohammed Jaftashi	
Idlib
64th Division	Muhammad Ahmad al-Gharib	
Homs
54th Division	Vacant (Note: The previous commander of the 54th Division, Hussein Abdullah Al-Ubayd, passed away on March 3rd 2026, according to government sources.)	
52nd Division	Haitham al-Ali	
Badia
118th Division	Raed al-Arab	
42nd Division	Mohammed Saeed Abdullah	
Eastern Syria
66th Division	Ahmed Al-Muhammad	
86th Division	Abu Hatem Shaqra	
Other divisions
128th Division		
111th Division		
98th Armored Division		
62nd Division	Mohammed al-Jassem	
Zubair bin al-Awwam Brigade		

== Equipment ==
As of April 2026, much of Syria's military equipment are a mix of former Ba'athist-owned military equipment and equipment formerly used by Hay'at Tahrir al-Sham and other Syrian opposition factions, though they have received several new armored personnel carriers and weaponry from Turkey, with the latter mostly seeing use in the Internal Security Forces.

After the fall of the Syrian regime, Israeli strikes on Syria intensified, destroying a large amount of Syria's military equipment within 48 hours. In addition, the Israeli army had also expanded its territorial control within Syria. Syrian president Ahmed al-Sharaa responded to the Israeli aggression with the following statement: "Israel clearly crossed the disengagement line in Syria, which threatens a new unjustified escalation in the region" but "the general exhaustion in Syria after years of war and conflict does not allow us to enter new conflicts."

=== Uniforms ===
==== 1987–2024 ====
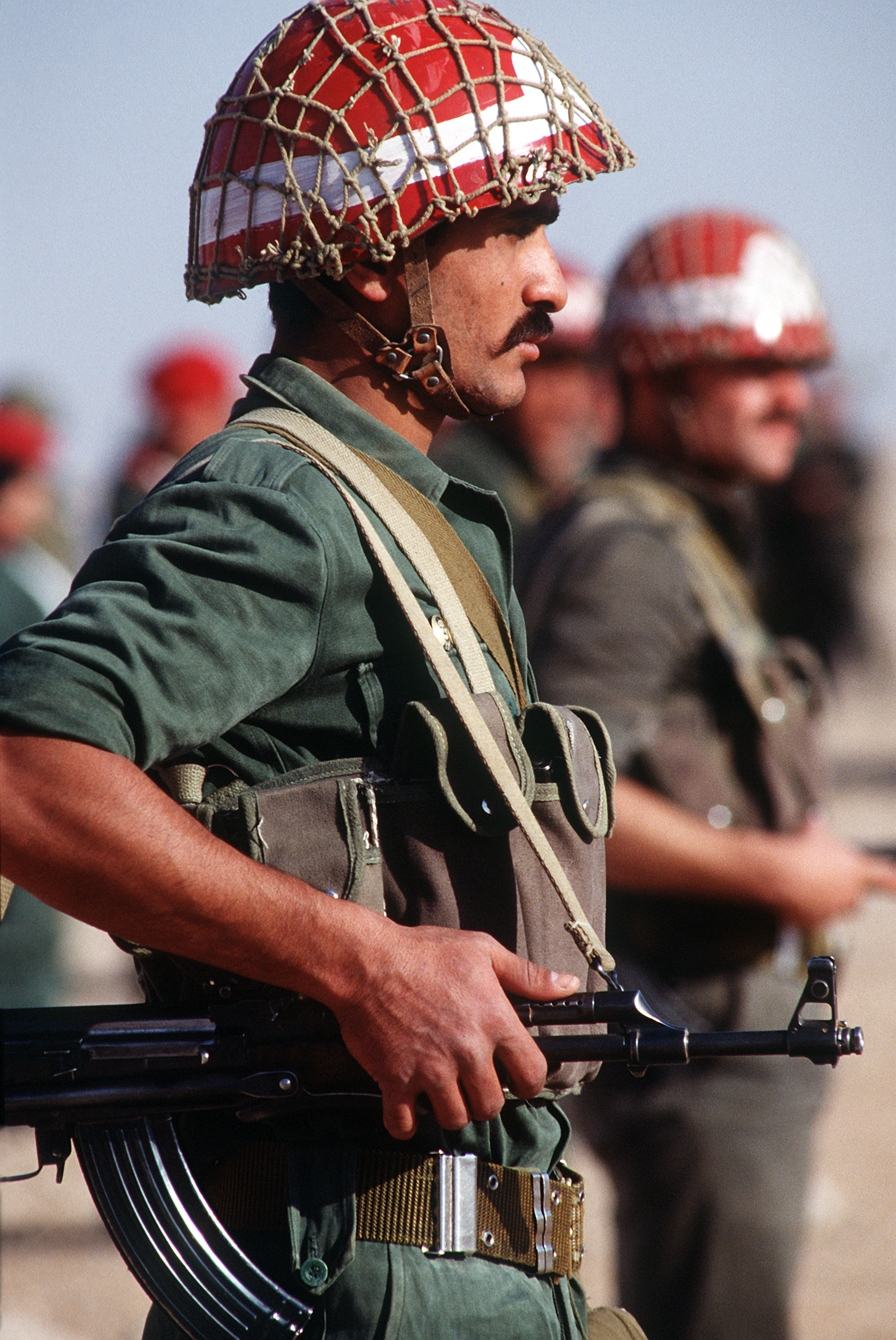
Syrian honor guard stands at attention during Operation Desert Shield. The soldier is armed with an AK-47 assault rifle.

In 1987, according to a Library of Congress Country Study on Syria, service uniforms for Syrian military officers generally followed the British Army style, although army combat clothing followed the older British model. Each uniform had two coats: a long one for dress and a short jacket for informal wear. Army officer uniforms were khaki in summer, and olive in winter. Certain Army and Air Defense personnel (i.e., commandos and paratroops) may have worn camouflage uniforms. Air Force officers had two uniforms for each season: a khaki and a light gray for summer and a dark blue and a light gray in winter. Naval officers wore white in summer and navy blue in winter while lower ranks wore the traditional bell bottoms and white blouse. The uniform for naval chief petty officers was a buttoned jacket, similar to that worn by American chief petty officers. Officers had a variety of headgear, including a service cap, garrison cap, and beret (linen in summer and wool in winter). The color of the beret varied by season and according to the officer's unit.

Syrian Commando and Paratroop uniforms consisted of lizard or woodland-patterned camouflage fatigues along with combat boots, helmets and bulletproof vests. Headgear consisted of a red or orange beret. The Syrian military provided NBC uniforms to soldiers to remain effective in an environment affected by biological or chemical agents. This uniform consisted of a Russian-made Model ShMS-41 mask similar to those made in the Desert Storm conflict. Previous models of the ShMS used a hose, while the improved "ShmS-41" used a canister-style respirator. It is difficult to assess how well equipped the Syrian Arab Army was. Although hundreds of hours of videos showing dead and captured Syrian soldiers filmed by rebels have been uploaded to social media, none show this equipment having been carried by or issued to frontline soldiers.

==== 2025 ====
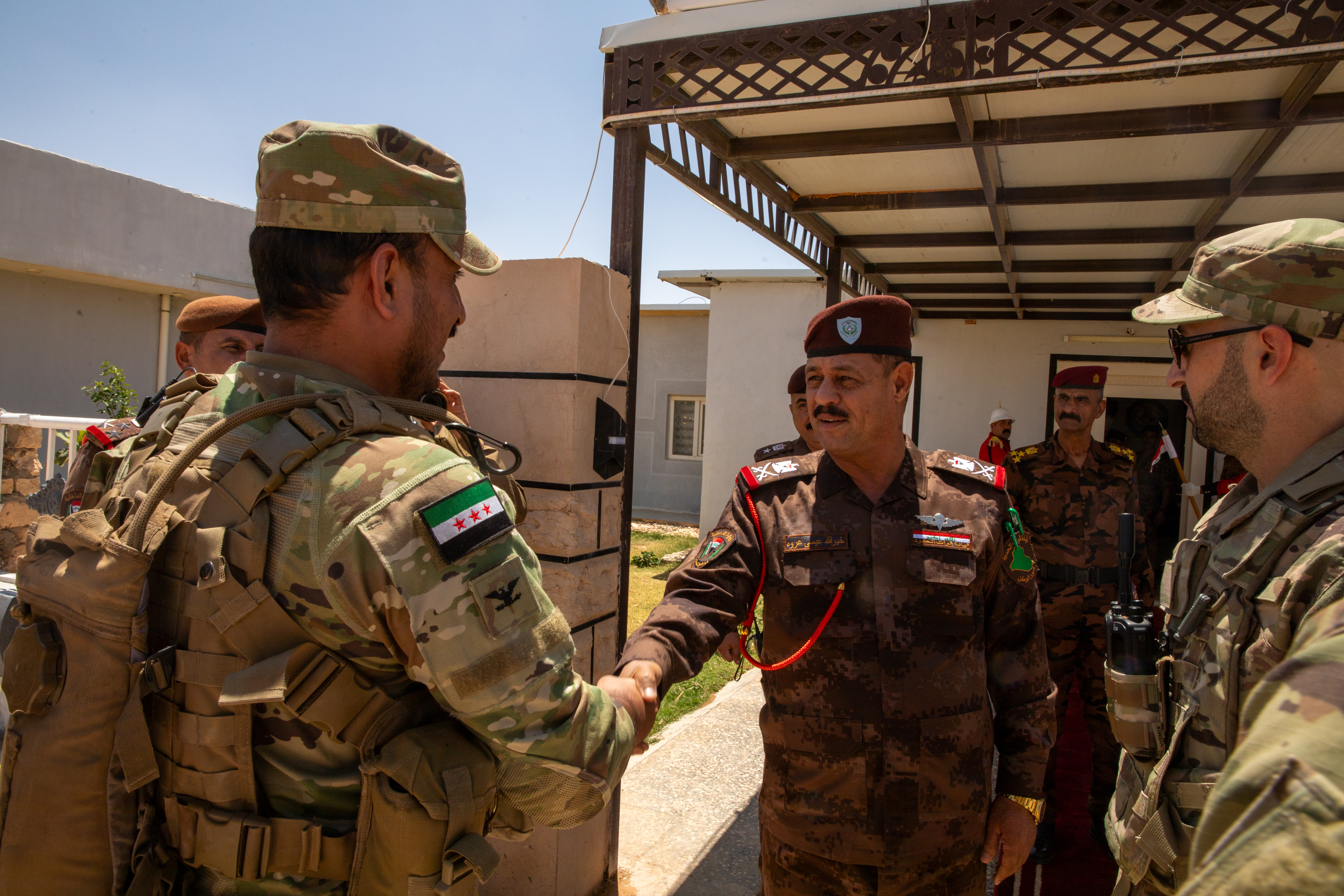
A Syrian military officer meets with an officer from the Iraqi Border Force Command.

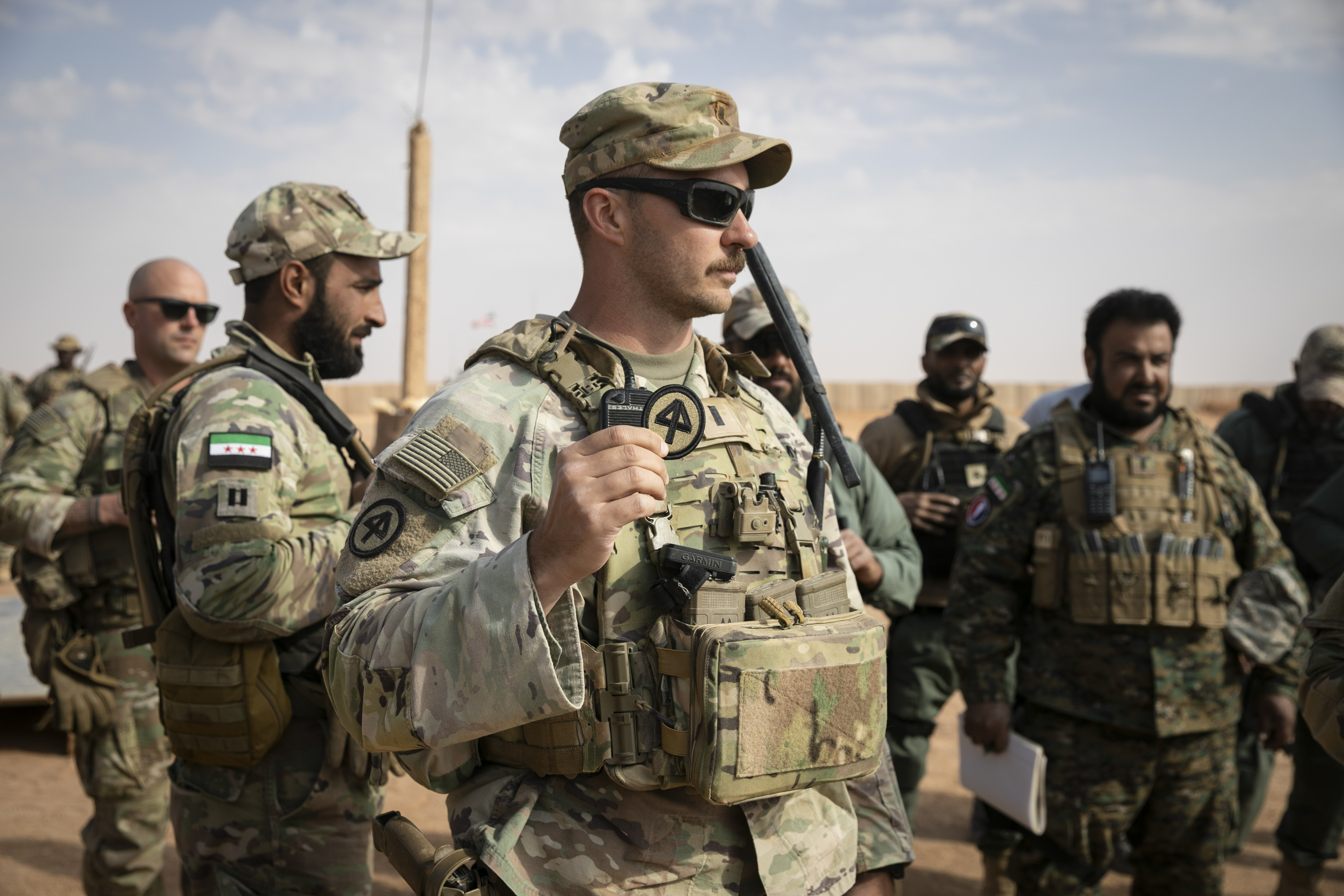
U.S. forces training with soldiers from the Syrian Army alongside from other coalition forces.

After the fall of the Assad regime, photographs and official documentation show the continued use of MultiCam, which was also used by the Ba'athist-led Syrian Arab Armed Forces prior to its collapse, among military personnel, alongside other camouflage uniforms.

=== Rank insignia ===
In 1987, according to a Library of Congress Country Study on Syria, the rank insignia of Syrian commissioned officers were identical for both the army and air force. These were gold on a bright green shoulder board for the army and gold on a bright blue board for the Air Force. Officer ranks were standard, although the highest was the equivalent of lieutenant general, a rank held in 1986 only by the commander-in-chief and the Minister of Defence.

Navy officer rank insignias were gold stripes worn on the lower sleeve. The highest-ranking officer in Syria's navy was the equivalent of lieutenant general. Army and Air Force ranks for warrant officers were indicated by gold stars on an olive green shield worn on the upper left arm. Lower noncommissioned ranks were indicated by upright and inverted chevrons worn on the upper left arm.

=== Awards and decorations ===
Although some twenty-five orders and medals were authorized, generally only senior officers and warrant officers wore medal ribbons. The following were some important Syrian awards: Order of Umayyad, the Medal of Military Honor, the War Medal, the Medal for Courage, the Yarmuk Medal, the Wounded in Action Medal, and the Medal of 8 March 1963.

Since the fall of the Assad regime, the status of these medals are currently unknown.

== See also ==
- Armed factions in the Syrian civil war
- War crimes in the Syrian civil war by the Ba'athist Syrian Armed Forces and its allied forces
- List of extrajudicial killings and political violence in Lebanon

== Notes ==
- International Institute for Strategic Studies (2025). The Military Balance. London: Routledge. ISBN 9781003630760.
- International Institute for Strategic Studies (2023). Hackett, James (ed.). The Military Balance (Report). Routledge. ISBN 9781032508955. ISSN 0459-7222.
- International Institute for Strategic Studies (2022). The Military Balance. London: Routledge. ISBN 978-1-032-27900-8. ISSN 0459-7222.
- International Institute for Strategic Studies (2019). "The Military Balance 2019". The Military Balance. London: Routledge. doi:10.1080/04597222.2018.1561033. ISSN 1479-9022. S2CID 219628874.
- International Institute for Strategic Studies (2011). The Military Balance 2011. Routledge. ISBN 978-1-85743-606-8.
- International Institute for Strategic Studies (2010). The Military Balance. Routledge. ISBN 978-1-85743-557-3.
- Pollack, Kenneth (2002). Arabs at War: Military Effectiveness, 1948–1991. University of Nebraska Press. ISBN 978-0-8032-3733-9.
- Schwarzkopf, H. Norman (1993). It Doesn't Take a Hero: The Autobiography of General H. Norman Schwarzkopf. Bantam Books. ISBN 978-0-553-56338-2.
- Seale, Patrick (1990). Asad of Syria: The Struggle for the Middle East. University of California Press. ISBN 978-0-520-06976-3.
- Sinai, Joshua (1987). Collelo, Thomas (ed.). A Country Study, Syria. Federal Research Division, Library of Congress.
- Straits Times (24 December 2024). "Syrian ex-rebel factions agree to merge under defence ministry".
