= Syrian Arab Armed Forces (Ba'athist Syria) =

Combined military forces of Ba'athist Syria

- القوات المسلحة العربية السورية
- Flag since 1980

- Coat of arms since 1980
- Motto: وطن، شرف، إخلاص; Watan, Sharaf, Ikhlas ("Homeland, Honor, Sincerity")
- Founded: 1963; 63 years ago
- Disbanded: De facto: 8 December 2024; De jure: 29 January 2025
- Service branches: Syrian Arab Army; Syrian Arab Air Force; Syrian Arab Air Defense Force; Syrian Arab Navy
- Headquarters: Hay'at al-Arkan, Umayyad Square, Damascus

Leadership
- Commander-in-chief: President Bashar al-Assad (last)
- Minister of Defence: General Ali Mahmoud Abbas (last)
- Chief of the General Staff: General Abdul Karim Mahmoud Ibrahim (last)

Personnel
- Military age: 18
- Conscription: Yes
- Active personnel: 170,000 (2023)
- Reserve personnel: 500,000 (2018)

Expenditure
- Budget: $1.8 billion (2019)
- Percent of GDP: 4.5% (2020)

Industry
- Domestic suppliers: Syrian Scientific Studies and Research Center (CERS); Établissement Industriel de la Défense (EID); Syrian Defense Laboratories (SDL)
- Foreign suppliers: Armenia; Belarus; Cuba; Iran; Iraq; North Korea; Laos; Pakistan; Russia; Venezuela Cold War-era suppliers: Czechoslovakia (Note: Until 1990. See also Velvet Revolution.); East Germany (Note: Until 1990. See also Fall of the Berlin Wall and German reunification.); Libya (Note: Until 2011. See also Battle of Tripoli (2011) and Killing of Muammar Gaddafi.); Romania (Note: Until 1989. See also Romanian Revolution.); Soviet Union (Note: Until 1991. See also Dissolution of the Soviet Union.)

Related articles
- History: Military history of Syria
- Ranks: Military ranks of Syria

The Syrian Arab Armed Forces (SAAF; Arabic: القوات المسلحة العربية السورية, romanized: al-Quwwāt al-Musallaḥah al-ʿArabīyah as-Sūrīyah) were the combined military forces of Ba'athist Syria.

The SAAF consisted of the Syrian Arab Army, Syrian Arab Air Force, Syrian Arab Air Defense Force, Syrian Arab Navy. According to the 2012 Constitution of Syria, the President of Syria was the Commander-in-chief of the Armed Forces. The Minister of Defence held the position of Deputy Commander-in-chief of the Army and Armed Forces.

The SAAF utilized conscription; males served in the military at age 18, but they were exempted from service if they did not have a brother who can take care of their parents. After the beginning of the Syrian civil war, Syrian military enlisted strength dropped by over half from a pre-civil war figure of 325,000 to 150,000 soldiers in the army in December 2014 due to casualties, desertions and draft dodging, reaching between 178,000 and 220,000 soldiers in the army, in addition to 80,000 to 100,000 irregular forces. By 2023, the number of active Syrian soldiers had increased to 170,000, but the number of active paramilitary and reserve forces may have decreased by as much as 50,000.

The Syrian Arab Armed Forces collapsed in 2024 with the fall of the Assad regime and flight of Bashar al-Assad. The new de-facto rulers of Syria, led by associates of Hay'at Tahrir al-Sham, are making preparations to drastically reorganise Syria's military forces and ambitions. On 21 December 2024, it was reported that Murhaf Abu Qasra had been appointed the new defence minister for the interim government.

== History ==
=== The 1963 coup and early history of the Arab Armed Forces ===
In 1963, the Military Committee of the Syrian Regional Command of the Arab Socialist Ba'ath Party spent most of its time planning to take power through a conventional military coup. From the very beginning, the Military Committee knew it had to capture al-Kiswah and Qatana—two military camps—seize control of the 70th Armored Brigade at al-Kiswah, the Military Academy in the city of Homs and the Damascus radio station. While the conspirators of the Military Committee were all young, their aim was not out of reach; the sitting regime had been slowly disintegrating and the traditional elite had lost effective political power over the country. A small group of military officers, including Hafez al-Assad, seized control in the March 1963 Syrian coup d'etat. Following the coup, Gen. Amin al-Hafiz discharged many ranking Sunni officers, thereby, Stratfor says, "providing openings for hundreds of Alawites to fill top-tier military positions during the 1963–1965 period on the grounds of being opposed to Arab unity. This measure tipped the balance in favor of Alawite officers who staged a coup in 1966 and, for the first time, placed Damascus in the hands of the Alawites."

The Arab Armed Forces were involved in the 1967 Six-Day War (against Israel). Since 1967, most of the Golan Heights territory of southwestern Syria has been under Israeli occupation. They then fought in the late 1960s War of Attrition (against Israel) and the 1970 Black September invasion of Jordan.

When Hafez al-Assad came to power in 1971, the army began to modernize and change. In the first 10 years of Assad's rule, the army increased by 162%, and by 264% by 2000. At one point, 70% of the country's GDP went only to the army. At the beginning of the Yom Kippur War of 1973 the Syrian Army launched an attack to seize the Golan Heights that was repelled by two Israeli brigades. Since 1973 the cease-fire line has been respected by both sides, with very few incidents until the Syrian civil war.

The Lebanese President invited Syria into his country in 1976, to intervene on the side of the Lebanese government against PLO guerilla and Lebanese Christian forces. The Arab Deterrent Force originally consisted of a Syrian core, up to 25,000 troops, with participation by some other Arab League states totalling only around 5,000 troops. In late 1978, after the Arab League had extended the mandate of the Arab Deterrent Force, the Sudanese, the Saudis and the United Arab Emirates announced intentions to withdraw troops from Lebanon, extending their stay into the early months of 1979 at the Lebanese government's request. The Libyan troops were essentially abandoned and had to find their own way home (if at all), and the ADF thereby became a purely Syrian force (which did include the Palestinian Liberation Army (PLA)). A year after Israel invaded and occupied Southern Lebanon during the 1982 Lebanon War, the Lebanese government failed to extend the ADF's mandate, thereby effectively ending its existence, although not the Syrian or Israeli military presence in Lebanon. Eventually the Syrian presence became known as the Syrian occupation of Lebanon.

=== Occupation of Lebanon (1982–2005) ===
Syrian forces, still technically known as the Arab Deterrent Force, lingered in Lebanon throughout the Lebanese civil war (1975–90). Eventually the Syrians brought most of the nation under their control as part of a power struggle with Israel, which had occupied areas of southern Lebanon in 1978. In 1985, Israel began to withdraw from Lebanon, as a result of domestic opposition in Israel and international pressure. In the aftermath of this withdrawal, the War of the Camps broke out, with Syria fighting their former Palestinian allies. Following the end of the Lebanese civil war in 1990, the Syrian occupation of Lebanon continued until they themselves were also forced out by widespread public protest and international pressure. About 20,000 Syrian soldiers were deployed in Lebanon until 27 April 2005, when the last of Syria's troops left the country. Syrian forces were accused of involvement in the murder of Rafiq al-Hariri, as well as continued meddling in Lebanese affairs, and an international investigation into the Hariri killing and several subsequent bomb attacks has been launched by the UN.

=== Other engagements ===
Engagements since 1979 included the Muslim Brotherhood insurgency (1979–82), notably including the Hama massacre, the 1982 Lebanon War (against Israel) and the dispatch of the 9th Armored Division to Saudi Arabia in 1990–91, ahead of the Gulf War against Iraq. The 9th Armored Division served as the Arab Joint Forces Command North reserve and saw little action. Syria's force numbered ~20,000 in strength (the sixth-largest contingent) and its involvement was justified domestically as an effort to defend Saudi Arabia. Syria's initial involvement in Operation Desert Shield also rolled into the Allied Operation Desert Storm, as Syrian forces did participate in helping dislodge and drive Iraqi forces out of Kuwait City. Total losses sustained were two dead and one wounded. There were indications the Syrian government had been prepared to double its force to 40,000.

=== Modernization efforts ===
In recent years Syria has relied on Russian arms purchases to obtain modern weapons. Purchases included anti-tank and air defense systems. In early September 2008 the Syrian government ordered MiG-29SMT fighters, Pantsir S1E air-defence systems, Iskander tactical missile systems, Yak-130 aircraft, and two Amur-1650 submarines from Russia. Russia's Foreign Minister Sergei Lavrov asserted that the sale wouldn't upset the balance of power in the Middle East and were "in line with . . . international law."

Russia aimed to turn the Russian naval base in Tartus into a permanent base. Israel and the US oppose further arms sales to Syria due to fears that the weapons could fall under the control of Iran or Hezbollah fighters in Lebanon.

=== Syrian civil war (2011–2024) ===
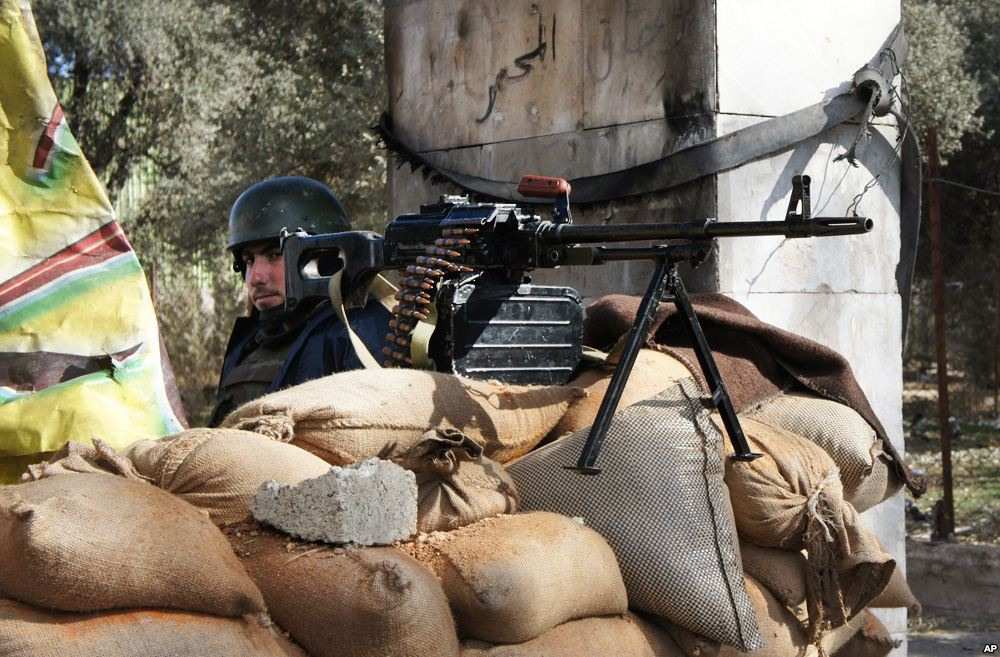
A Syrian soldier manning a checkpoint near Damascus.

In March 2011, protests erupted in the southern city of Daraa after the arrest and torture of fifteen students for writing anti-government graffiti. As demonstrations spread, local security forces were unable to contain the unrest, prompting the Assad government to deploy Syrian Arab Army units to restore control. Troops surrounded the city, imposed a siege, and opened fire on unarmed demonstrators—marking the first major military crackdown of the uprising. The violence in Daraa provoked nationwide outrage, transforming peaceful protests into an armed rebellion that quickly spread across Syria. As the army intensified its campaign of repression and mass arrests in April 2011, growing numbers of soldiers and officers—drawn from various sectarian and religious backgrounds, including Sunni, Shia, Druze, and Christian—refused orders to fire on civilians and defected, exposing early fractures within the military. Many former soldiers and officers left the Syrian Arab Army to form or join armed opposition groups. The most prominent of these during the early stage of the war was the Free Syrian Army, who had the primary goal of overthrowing the regime of Bashar al-Assad.

By March 2012, the government sought to stem further defections and desertions by imposing strict travel restrictions on military-aged men, banning all males between 18 and 42 years old from leaving the country. Despite this, defections continued at a rapid pace; by June 2012, Free Syrian Army commander Riad al-Asaad claimed that 20–30 Syrian officers were fleeing to Turkey each day. The crisis deepened on 18 July 2012, when a bomb explosion at Syria’s national security headquarters in Damascus killed Defense Minister Dawoud Rajha, former defense minister Hasan Turkmani, and the president’s brother-in-law, General Assef Shawkat. Intelligence chief Hisham Bekhityar and Maher al-Assad, commander of the elite 4th Armored Division and brother of the president, were also wounded in the blast—further demonstrating the regime’s growing internal vulnerability as the war escalated.

Despite shrinking by nearly half from the 2011 beginning of the civil war by 2014, the Armed Forces became much more flexible and capable, especially in anti-guerilla warfare. Their modus operandi switched from traditional Soviet-modeled conventional military forces into a force of smaller groups fighting in close-quarters guerrilla combat with an increasing role for junior officers. The number of defections within the Syrian military was estimated at around 170,000 personnel spanning multiple ranks and divisions. Throughout the war, they employed systematically brutal tactics—besieging entire cities, cutting off food, medicine, and water, and bombarding civilian areas to force capitulation. They indiscriminately used barrel bombs, cluster munitions, and heavy artillery in densely populated neighborhoods, carried out chemical attacks, and repeatedly struck hospitals, schools, and aid convoys. These actions caused widespread civilian suffering and drew international condemnation, economic sanctions, and U.S. military missile strikes in 2017 and 2018. Human Rights Watch documented deliberate demolition of neighborhoods as collective punishment, beyond immediate battle damage. Throughout the entirety of the war, most Syrian Arab Army units were operating with severely outdated and poorly maintained Soviet-era equipment dating back to the 1970s and 1980s. Years of combat, sanctions, and loss of foreign suppliers left many vehicles in disrepair, forcing troops to reuse salvaged parts or improvise battlefield repairs. Russia provided limited modernization and battlefield aid, including T-90 tanks, guided munitions, refurbished aircraft, and training support, which temporarily improved performance in key offensives. The army struggled to contain ISIS due to manpower shortages, collapsing logistics, and outdated equipment, losing major bases and cities such as Raqqa and Palmyra.

After 2015, the Syrian Arab Army began to recover from near-collapse, largely due to direct Russian military intervention and continued Iranian support. Russian air power, advisors, and intelligence enabled the army to reorganize and launch coordinated offensives for the first time in years. The Battle of Aleppo became an important moment, with intense Russian bombardment and Iranian-backed militias on the ground. In December 2016, the army regained control over the whole city, ending one of the war's longest and bloodiest sieges. In 2017, the army launched a series of offensives (Note: These offensives were: Central Syria campaign, Syrian Desert campaign, Eastern Homs offensive, Maskanah Plains offensive and 2017 Southern Raqqa offensive.) in central and eastern Syria against the Islamic State, including the campaigns to retake Palmyra and Deir ez-Zor.

Despite significant battlefield successes after 2016, the government-aligned Syrian Arab never regained complete control of the country. Foreign intervention and the growth of independent armed groups left large areas outside the government's control. However, most analysts and foreign countries recognized or accepted that Assad had won the conflict by 2019, as his government held the majority of the land. This led to the renewal of diplomatic ties between Syria and several Arab nations. Kurdish-led forces in the northeast controlled much land after fighting the Islamic State with American support. The Syrian military maintained slight strongholds in some places in Northeastern Syria, but real authority in the region belonged to the local Kurdish administration, which was backed by the United States. Several attempts by the government to negotiate with Kurdish leaders failed, leaving the area effectively self-governed and separate from the Assad government. In the north, the army also lost control to Turkey and Turkish-backed Syrian groups. In April 2019, the Syrian army launched a major offensive in northwestern Syria aimed at recapturing Idlib Province and parts of northern Hama—the last major region held by opposition forces. The area was largely controlled by Hay’at Tahrir al-Sham, an Islamist group that had become the dominant rebel faction, along with other Turkish-backed fighters. Turkish military operations between 2016 and 2019 created a long zone of occupation stretching across the border region, including the city of Afrin. These areas were run jointly by Turkish forces and their allied militias. Nevertheless, the army continued to face strong resistance from the rebel group Hay’at Tahrir al-Sham, which remained in control despite several government offensives supported by Russian airstrikes.

Since the start of the conflict in Syria, human rights groups say that the majority of abuses were committed by the Syrian government's forces, and UN investigations concluded that the government's abuses were the greatest in both gravity and scale. The branches of the Syrian Armed Forces that committed war crimes include at least the Syrian Arab Army, Syrian Arab Air Force and the Syrian Military Intelligence. However the Syrian authorities denied these accusations and claimed that irregular armed groups with foreign support are behind the atrocities, including Al Qaeda linked Insurgents.

The numbers in the Syrian armed forces had reduced considerably during the Civil War, although estimates varied.

Syrian Armed Forces size during the Civil War
Year	Army personnel	Air Force personnel	Total: Army + Air Force
2011	220,000	100,000	320,000
2014	110,000	63,000	173,000

Russian sources gave higher estimates. In 2014, Gazeta.ru reported that the regular army had reduced from 325,000 to 150,000 due to "mortality, desertions and deviations", but that this was supplemented by 60,000 Republican Guards and 50,000 Kurdish militias. In 2015, LifeNews still reported the same figures.

By September 2018, Statista estimated that the Syrian Air Force had lost around 111 aircraft since the start of the civil war, including both combat planes and reconnaissance drones. The majority of these losses occurred during the first four years of the conflict, when the air force faced heavy strain, poor maintenance, and frequent rebel attacks on airbases. After Russia’s military intervention in 2015, aircraft losses declined sharply as Russian air cover, repairs, and training support helped stabilize Syria’s remaining air capabilities.

=== Fall of the Assad regime and insurgency ===
In December 2024, the Syrian Arab Army, alongside the Syrian Arab Republic itself, collapsed as the Assad regime fell. Some of the remaining SAA forces crossed into Iraq, others removed their uniforms before the rebels could arrive in Damascus, the last remaining territory controlled by the SAR. Retired U.S. General Wesley Clark said that a video showing the SAA forces evacuating to Iraq showed the "demoralization and collapse of an army", and that the forces knew they would lose, with the rebels taking Damascus and Assad's whereabouts unknown. He compared it to the fall of Kabul in 2021, where the U.S.-backed Afghan Armed Forces collapsed, and that when faced with certain defeat, armies simply "melt away".

On 22 December 2024, Ahmed al-Sharaa said that the new Syrian government would announce the new structure of the Syrian military within days. On 24 December 2024, it was announced that the leaders of the different Syrian rebel forces would disband their forces and merge them under the defence ministry.

On 26 December 2024, the "former forces of deposed leader Bashar al-Assad" killed 14 HTS fighters following the capture of Mohammad Kanjo Hassan. This has led to the Western Syria clashes against the new Syrian government. And the Syrian Arab Armed forces have been disbanded as of December 2024 after the fall of the Assad regime.

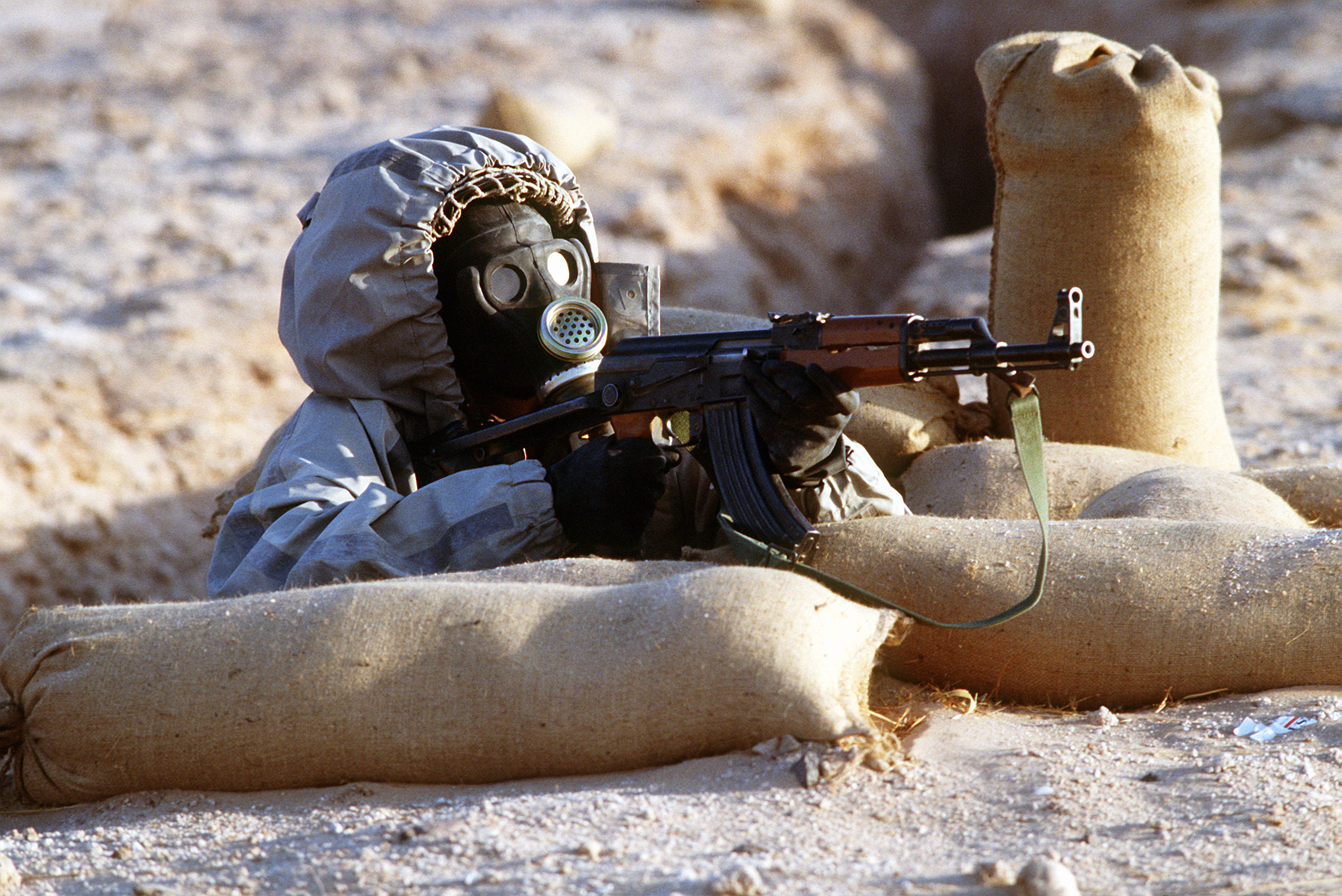
A Syrian soldier aims a Type 56 assault rifle from his position in a foxhole during Operation Desert Shield. The soldier is wearing a Soviet-made Model ShMS nuclear-biological-chemical warfare mask.

== Structure ==
=== Demographics and military service ===
With its headquarters in Damascus, the Syrian military consisted of air, ground and naval forces. Active personnel were estimated as 295,000 in 2011, with an additional 314,000 reserves. Paramilitary forces were estimated at 108,000 in 2011. Estimates of the declining size of the armed forces over time include 141,400 as of June 2019. (50% shrinkage according to sources) By 2023, the number of active soldiers in the Syrian military increased to 170,000. Also in 2023, the number of active paramilitary and reserve forces in the Syrian military decreased up to 50,000.

In 2011, the majority of the Syrian military were Sunni, but most of the military leadership were Alawites. Alawites made up 12% of the pre-war Syrian population, but 70% of the career soldiers in the Syrian Army. A similar imbalance was seen in the officer corps, where some 80% of the officers are Alawites. The military's most elite divisions, the Republican Guard and the 4th Armored Division, which were commanded by Bashar al-Assad's brother Maher, were exclusively Alawite. Most of Syria's 300,000 conscripts in 2011 were Sunni.

Before the start of the Syrian Civil War, the obligatory military service period was being decreased over time. In 2005, it was reduced from two and a half years to two years, in 2008 to 21 months and in 2011 to a year and a half. Since the Syrian Civil War the Syrian government has implemented a retention system for those in compulsory service (conscript retention into service after the specified period has passed) and enacted new regulations, with citizens who completed mandatory conscription being called up for reserve duty. By 2020, with the Syrian government having regained control over a large portion of Syrian territory, the General Staff of the Army and Armed Forces issued several demobilization decisions from service (retention and reserve) in batches.

Soldiers of the Syrian Armed Forces were divided into two main categories:

- Volunteers were those who join its ranks voluntarily after they reach eighteen years of age, of all ranks, specializations, and both sexes. They were promoted according to the internal regulations and receive a salary and compensation in return.
- The assigned were males were called (exclusively) to serve in the army when they reach the age of eighteen and until they reach the age of forty-two, but they were exempted from service as long as they were single to their mothers, or do not have another brother capable of taking care of their parents or have an impediment such as a health condition that prevents them from performing their service.

There were also civilian employees and reserves in the ranks of the armed forces who were called to serve in times of war and emergencies.

==== Administrative departments ====
- General Staff of the Army and Armed Forces
  - Military Intelligence Directorate
  - Air Force Intelligence Directorate
  - Army and Armed Forces Operations Authority
  - Artillery and Missile Forces
  - Electronic Warfare Forces
  - Special Operations Forces Command
  - Military Police Department
  - Political Guidance Department
  - Military Judicial Directorate
  - Military Engineering Directorate
  - General Recruitment Directorate
  - Manpower Directorate

=== Syrian Arab Army ===
Syrian Army Flag

In 1987 Joshua Sinai of the Library of Congress wrote that the Syrian Army (SAA) was the dominant military service, and as such controlled the senior-most posts in the armed forces and had the most manpower, approximately 80% of the combined services. In 1987 Joshua Sinai wrote that the major development in structural organization was the establishment of an additional divisional framework based on the special forces and the organization of ground formations into three corps. In 2010, the International Institute for Strategic Studies estimated army regulars or professionals at 220,000, with an additional 280,000 reserves. That figure was unchanged in the 2011 edition of the Military Balance, but in the 2013 edition, in the midst of the war, the IISS estimated that army strength was 110,000. By the end of 2018, analysts estimated the SAA to have just 100,000 combat-ready troops.

Between 2015 and 2018, the Syrian military under the supervision of Ministry of Defense underwent major structural changes, with the cooperation of Russia and Iran. This reform reflected a broader trend of consolidation within the Army. Part of this included the recruitment and mass integration of reconciled rebels. Since 2018, the Syrian military renewed its fortification and the annual training to prepare for war against Israel, while at the same time trying to increase its strategic independence. The Syrian government invested major sums in rebuilding the Syrian military through force buildup and reorganization measures, including with new personnel appointments.

By 2019, the Army's formations included three army corps (the 1st, 2nd and 3rd), one assault corps (5th), eight armored divisions, five mechanized divisions, two semi-autonomous reserve divisions, three armored/airborne special forces divisions and seven border guard regiments. Evolution of the command structure, training and military system continued.

Reports since the beginning of the war clarified the organisation of the army. In addition to the 14th Special Forces Division, the 15th Special Forces Division was identified by Human Rights Watch in 2011. New Special Forces units formed during the war included 25th Special Mission Forces Division. In addition, new regular army units such as 2nd Armored Division, 6th Armored Division and 8th Armored Division, were created by 2015. Units reporting to the Chief of Staff are 4th Armored Division, the Republican Guard and 25th Special Mission Forces Division. The 4th Armored Division became one of the Syrian government's most trusted security forces.

By 2023, the number of active soldiers in the Syrian Arab Army had increased to 130,000. In April 2024, Major General Suhayl al-Hasan was named as commander of the Special Operations Forces (SOF) of the Syrian Army. In July 2024, the first phase of training began to build and form new SOF units in the SAA. The main aim was to create special forces comparable to the Special Operations Forces in Russia.

=== Air Force ===
Syrian Air Force Flag

The Syrian Arab Air Force was the aviation branch of the Syrian Armed Forces. It was established in 1948 and saw combat in 1948, 1967, 1973 and in 1982 against Israel. It has seen combat against militant groups on Syrian soil from 2011 to 2012, during the Syrian civil war. Previously there were at least 15 Syrian Air Force bases throughout the country. Prior to the war, the Syrian Air Force was one of the largest in the Arab world, and became a decisive factor in the conflict by mid-2012, when Assad’s government began using airstrikes against rebel-held towns. Rebel groups began using man-portable air-defense systems which led to significant losses. In 2022 the Air Force was reportedly estimated at 15,000 strong. Following the fall of Assad's regime, Israel executed several air strikes that have eliminated most of Syria's air force, according to foreign reports.

=== Air Defense ===
Syrian Air Defence Force Flag

In 1986, according to the Library of Congress Country Studies, the Air Defence Command, within the Army Command but also composed of Air Force personnel, numbered approximately 60,000. In 1987 units included 20 air defense brigades (with approximately 95 SAM batteries) and two air defense regiments. The Air Defence Command had command access to interceptor aircraft and radar facilities. Air defenses included SA-5 long-range SAM batteries around Damascus and Aleppo, with additional SA-6 and SA-8 mobile SAM units deployed along Syria's side of the Lebanese border and in eastern Lebanon.

At some later point in time, the Air Defence Command was upgraded into a separate Syrian Air Defense Force. In 2022, it was reported as 21,000 strong. Following the downfall of Assad's regime, Israel launched several air strikes eliminating Syria's air defence system, which it considers one of the most powerful air defense systems in the Middle East.

=== Navy ===
Syrian Navy Flag

In 1950 the Syrian Navy was established following the procurement of a few naval craft from France. The initial personnel consisted of soldiers who had been sent to French academies of naval training. In 1985 the Navy consisted of approximately 4,000 regular and 2,500 reserve officers and men. The navy was under the army's Latakia regional command. The fleet was based in the ports of Latakia, Baniyas, Minat al Bayda and Tartus. Among the 41 vessel fleet were two frigates, 22 missile attack craft (including ten advanced Osa II missile boats), three old submarines, two submarine chasers, four mine warfare vessels, eight gunboats, six patrol craft, four missile corvettes (on order), three landing craft (on order), one torpedo recovery vessel and, as part of its coastal defense system, Sepal shore-based, anti-ship missiles with a range of 300 km. In 2011, the Navy was estimated have 5,000 personnel. In 2022 it was estimated at 4,000. After the downfall of the Assad regime, Israel launched a series of air and navy strike, targeting and eliminating the Syrian navy while at port.

== Paramilitary forces ==
- Defense Companies – since merged into the Syrian Arab Army as the 4th Armoured division and the Republican Guard as well as the 14th Airborne Division comprising five Special Forces regiments.
- Struggle Companies – dissolved.
- Shabiha – Sectarian Pro Government Militias, Merged into the National Defense Forces.
- Popular Committees – Neighborhood vigilante groups, Merged into the National Defense Forces.
- National Defence Forces – a part-time volunteer reserve component of the military.
- Local Defence Forces
  - Baqir Brigade
  - Lions of Hussein
  - 313th Regiment
  - Tribes of Manbij Regiment
  - Shuhada Nubl wa al-Zahraa Regiment
  - As-Safira Regiment
  - Special Assignments Battalion
  - Al-Nayrab Special Forces Battalion
  - Qamr Bani Hashim Battalion
