= Chief of the General Staff (Syria) =

Head of the armed forces of Syria

Chief of the General Staff of the Army and Armed Forces
- رئيس هيئة الأركان العامة للجيش والقوات المسلحة
- Incumbent; Ali Noureddine al-Naasan since 21 December 2024
- Ministry of Defense
- Reports to: Minister of Defense
- Residence: Damascus
- Seat: Hay'at al-Arkan, Umayyad Square
- Appointer: President
- Formation: 1947; 79 years ago
- First holder: Abdullah Atfeh

The Chief of the General Staff of the Army and Armed Forces (Arabic: رئيس هيئة الأركان العامة للجيش والقوات المسلحة, romanized: Raʾīs Hayʾat al-Arkān al-ʿĀmma li-l-Jaysh wa-l-Quwwāt al-Musallaḥa) is the professional head of the Syrian Armed Forces and the Syrian Army. The Chief of the General Staff is appointed by the President of Syria, who is the commander-in-chief of the Armed Forces.

On 16 July 2025, the Israeli Air Force bombed the entrance and two of its facades to the General Staff headquarters in Damascus, amid the July 2025 southern Syria clashes.

== List of officeholders ==
No.	Portrait	Name (Birth–Death)	Term of office			Ref.
No.	Portrait	Name (Birth–Death)	Took office	Left office	Time in office	Ref.
1		Major general Abdullah Atfeh (1897–1976)	1947	1948	0–1 years	
2		Brigadier general Husni al-Za'im (1897–1949)	1948	1949	0–1 years	
3		Colonel; Sami al-Hinnawi (1898–1950)	1949	1950	0–1 years	
4		Brigadier general Anwar Bannud (1908–1979)	2 January 1950	23 April 1951	1 year, 111 days	
5		Fawzi Selu (1905–1972)	23 April 1951	1953	1–2 years	
6		General; Shawkat Shuqayr (1912–1982)	1953	8 July 1956	2–3 years	
7		General; Tawfiq Nizam al-Din	8 July 1956	1957	0–1 years	
8		Lieutenant general Afif al-Bizri (1912–1982)	1957	1959	1–2 years	
9		General; Jamal al-Faisal (1915–1995)	1959	28 September 1961	1–2 years	
10		General; Abdul Karim Zahreddine (1917–2009)	28 September 1961	8 March 1963	1 year, 161 days	
11		Major general Ziad al-Hariri (1929–2015)	8 March 1963	8 July 1963	122 days	
12		Major general Salah Jadid (1926–1993)	11 November 1963	1966	2–3 years	
13		Major general Ahmed Suwaydani (1932–1994)	February 1966	February 1968	1–2 years	
14		Colonel general Mustafa Tlass (1932–2017)	1968	1972	3–4 years	
15		Colonel general Yusuf Shakkur (1926–2018)	1972	1974	1–2 years	
16		Colonel general Hikmat al-Shihabi (1931–2013)	12 August 1974	8 July 1998	23 years, 330 days	
17		Lieutenant general Ali Aslan (born 1932)	8 July 1998	23 January 2002	3 years, 199 days	
18		Lieutenant general Hasan Turkmani (1935–2012)	23 January 2002	12 May 2004	2 years, 110 days	
19		Colonel general Ali Habib Mahmud (1939–2020)	12 May 2004	3 June 2009	5 years, 22 days	
20		Colonel general Dawoud Rajiha (1947–2012)	3 June 2009	8 August 2011	2 years, 66 days	
21		Colonel general Fahd Jassem al-Freij (born 1950)	8 August 2011	18 July 2012	345 days	
22		Lieutenant general Ali Abdullah Ayyoub (born 1952)	18 July 2012	1 January 2018	5 years, 167 days	
Vacant 1 January 2018–1 April 2019
23		Lieutenant general Salim Harba	1 April 2019	30 April 2022	3 years, 29 days	
24		Lieutenant general Abdul Karim Mahmoud Ibrahim (born 1963)	30 April 2022	8 December 2024	2 years, 222 days	
Vacant 8–21 December 2024
25		Major general Ali Noureddine al-Naasan (born 1970)	21 December 2024	Incumbent	1 year, 260 days	

== See also ==
- Syrian Arab Armed Forces, the combined armed forces of Ba'athist Syria
