= Ali Noureddine al-Naasan =

Syrian military officer (born 1970)

Major General Ali Noureddine al-Naasan
- علي نور الدين النعسان

Chief of the General Staff
- Incumbent
- Assumed office 21 December 2024
- President: Ahmed al-Sharaa (Note: As de facto leader until 29 January 2025.)
- Prime Minister: Mohammed al-Bashir (2024–2025)
- Preceded by: Abdul Karim Mahmoud Ibrahim

Personal details
- Born: 1970 (age 55–56) Taybat al-Imam, Hama, Syria
- Party: Independent
- Other political affiliations: Hay'at Tahrir al-Sham (until 2025)
- Profession: Military officer
- Nickname: Abu Hamza (أبو حمزة)

Military service
- Allegiance: Syria (2024–present); Formerly: Ba'athist Syria (until 2011); Syrian opposition (2011–2024); Free Syrian Army (from 2011); Hay'at Tahrir al-Sham (until 2025)
- Branch/service: Syrian Army
- Rank: Major general
- Commands: Syrian Armed Forces
- Battles/wars: Syrian civil war

Ali Noureddine al-Naasan (Arabic: علي نور الدين النعسان) is a Syrian military officer and former rebel commander who serves as the incumbent chief of staff of the Syrian Armed Forces in the Syrian transitional government. Prior to the Syrian civil war, al-Naasan served as a Syrian Army officer under the Ba'athist government, later defecting in early 2011 to the Syrian opposition.

== Biography ==
=== Early life and career ===
He was born in the town of Taybat al-Imam, Hama Governorate during the mid-1970s, he was nicknamed "Abu Hamza". Al-Naasan studied locally at Taybat al-Imam before graduating as an officer with distinction from a military academy, he assumed leadership positions in infantry and armored units of the Syrian Arab Army. After the outbreak of the Syrian revolution in 2011 he defected to the Syrian Opposition, participating in fighting in North Syria. Al-Naasan became a military commander in Hay'at Tahrir al-Sham (HTS) and was a commander in the HTS-led Military Operations Command during the 2024 Syrian opposition offensives.

=== Chief of the General Staff of Syria ===
After the fall of the Assad regime, al-Naasan was appointed as Chief of the General Staff (COGS) and tasked with rebuilding the Syrian Army. Al Jazeera reported in January 2025 that al-Naasan had "modernised" armament systems, introduced modern training and operational technology, and instituted an 'advanced training program' (برامج تدريب متقدمة) for officers and soldiers in crisis management and modern warfare.

On 29 December 2024, Ahmed al-Sharaa announced the promotion of COGS Ali Noureddine al-Naasan to the rank of Major-General, together with the elevation of 48 other individuals including Defence Minister Murhaf Abu Qasra, who was also promoted to the rank of Major General alongside al-Naasan.

On 9 January 2025, Al Jazeera reported that al-Naasan's appointment as Chief of the General Staff was confirmed.

== See also ==
- Chief of the General Staff (Syria)
- Murhaf Abu Qasra
