= National Library of Syria =

Coordinates: 33°30′53″N 36°16′39″E

- المكتبة الوطنية السورية

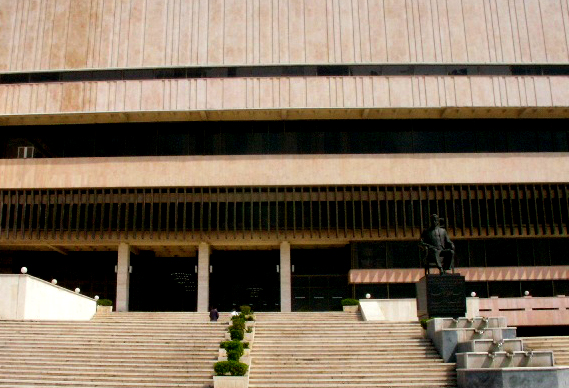
- The library building
- Location: Umayyad Square, Damascus, Syria
- Type: Public, National library.
- Established: 1984 (42 years ago)
- Architect: Jan-Jacques Meissner

Collection
- Size: Over 40,000 titles

Other information
- Website: snl.gov.sy

The National Library of Syria (Arabic: المكتبة الوطنية السورية, romanized: al-Maktabah al-Waṭanīyah al-Sūrīyah) is the national legal deposit and copyright library of Syria, located in the capital Damascus overlooking the Umayyad Square.

The Libraries and Documents Association of Syria has its headquarters at the National Library. As of July 2025 the Director is Saeed Hijazi.

== History ==
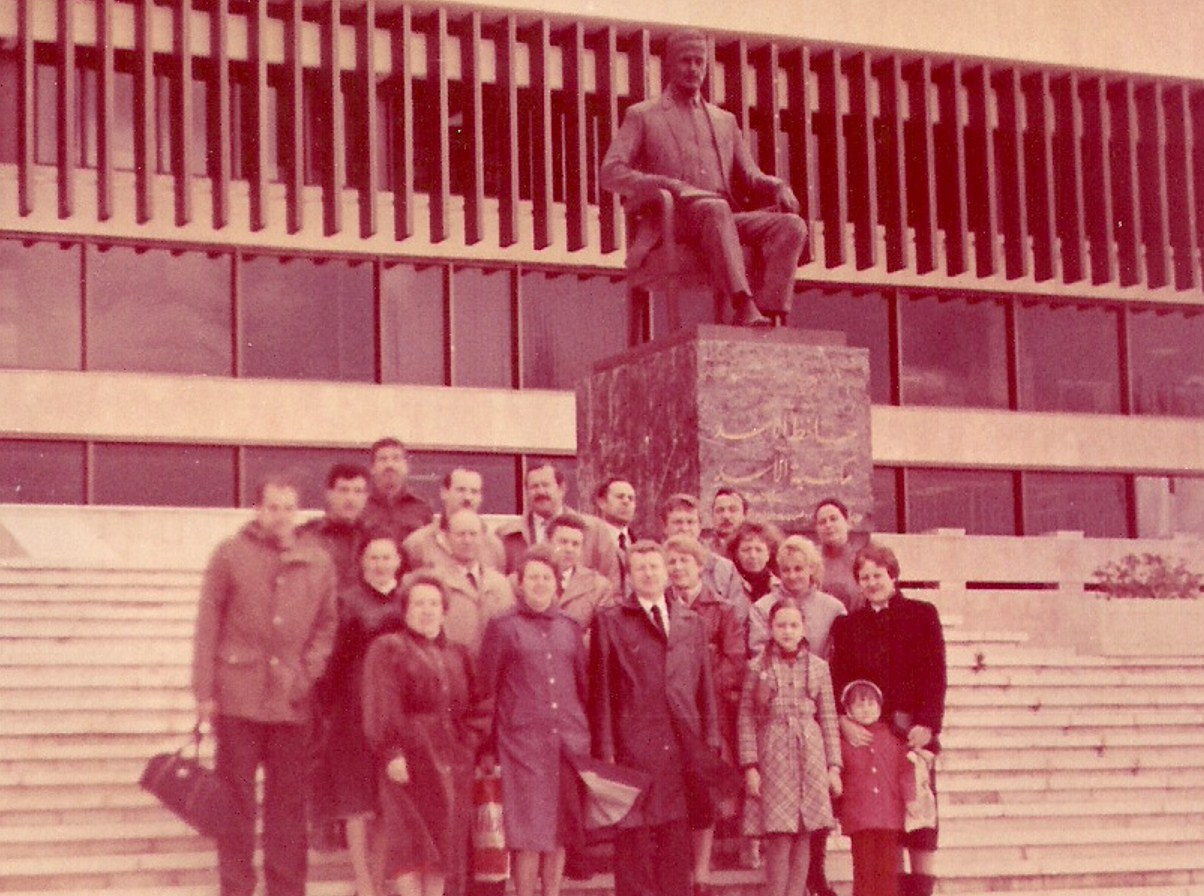
Soviet Advisors and their families in front of the library after it was opened

In 1976, Syria's Ministry of Culture announced an official decision to build a national library. Construction began in 1978 and the library was completed in November 1983 and was opened the following year. The library's purpose was "to gather all books and daily issues in addition to all kinds of literature connected with our ancestral cultural legacy", then to sort out these materials to serve researchers and scholars and benefit them.

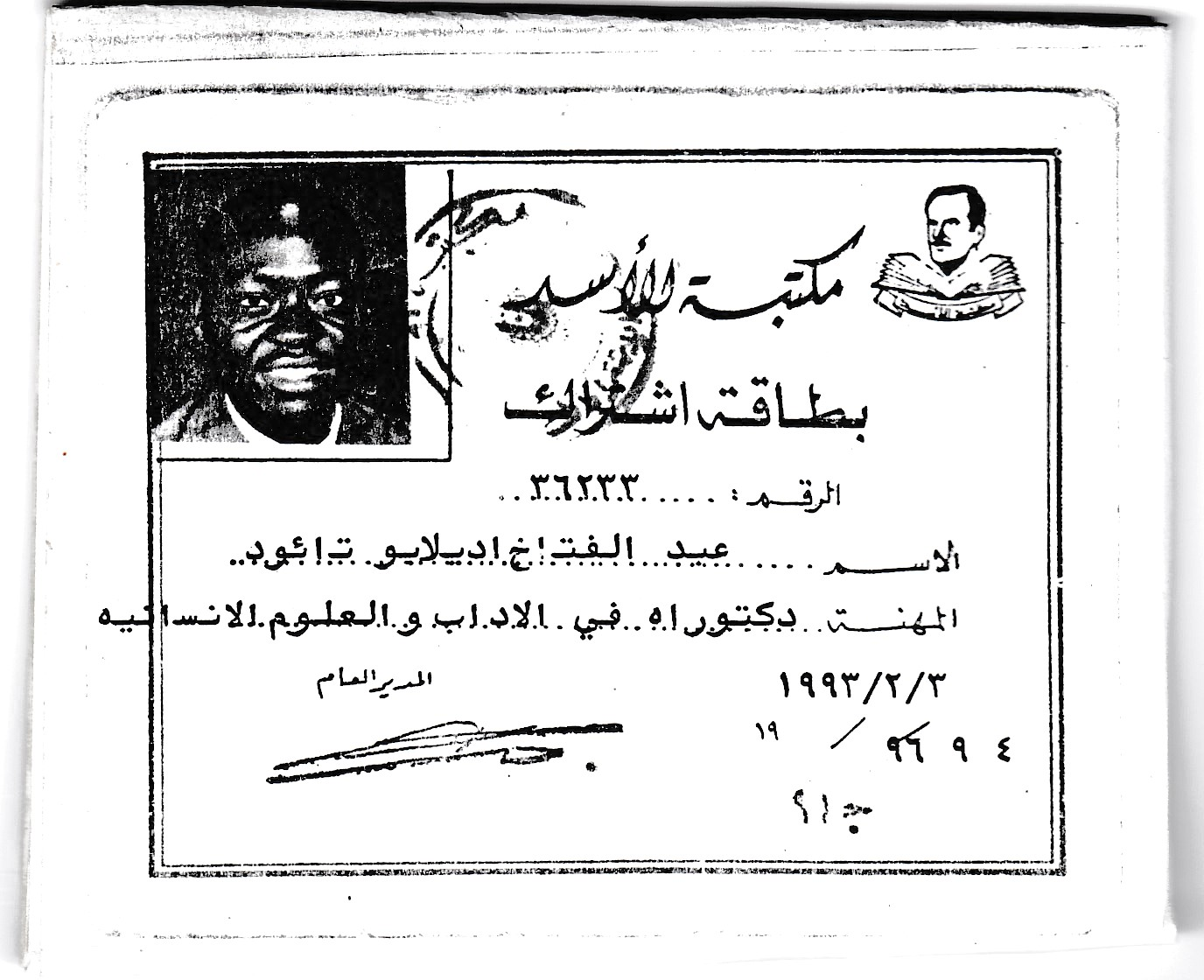
Copy of Al-Assad National Library Card for Nigerian Ph.D. researcher Sheikh Dr. Abu-Abdullah Adelabu in the 1990s

The library, from its founding until December 10, 2024 (two days after the fall of the Assad regime), was named the Al-Assad National Library (Arabic: مَكْتَبَةُ الْأَسَدِ الْوَطَنِيَّةِ, romanized: Maktabat al-ʾAsad al-Waṭanīyah), after Hafez al-Assad.

== Departments ==
The library has several departments which include a lecture hall and a special department for blind people. The library's departments are as follows:

- Department of Photographic Documentation: in its three forms (microfilm, microfiche, photocopy). This section was founded in order to satisfy the readers' wishes to obtain photocopies of books and publications.
- Department of Audio Material: In which the library's books and manuscripts are available in audio form.
- Department of Documentaries: In which documentaries are stored available to be watched.
- Department of Fine Arts: Which contains the works of contemporary Syrian artists.
- Department of Periodicals: In which regular publications and publications are deposited.
- Department of the Blind: In which books and other material are available in braille for blind people.
- Department of Information: In which specialists help readers to reach the required topics, and navigate through the various indexes, and through international information systems that enable the reader to identify the latest source of references in each subject.
- The Lecture Hall: The library has a main lecture hall which can accommodate 308 people. It is suitable for films, lectures and conferences. It is equipped with a radio system for simultaneous interpretation in four languages. There are also two other halls, each of which can accommodate up to 20 people.
- Reading Room: The library has three reading halls and four other reading rooms. The halls can accommodate up to 1,000 readers at the same time.
- Individual Reading Rooms: 21 Individual Reading Rooms are available.
- Showrooms: There are several showrooms in the library specifically for exhibitions such as art and book exhibitions.
