= Hay'at al-Arkan =

Headquarters of the Ministry of Defense

- هيئة الأركان العامة
- Part of Syrian Armed Forces
- Umayyad Square, Damascus in Syria

Site information
- Type: Military headquarters
- Owner: Government of Syria
- Operator: Syrian Armed Forces; Ministry of Defense
- Controlled by: Chief of the General Staff (Syria)
- Open to the public: No
- Condition: Damaged

Location
- Location in Damascus, Syria
- Coordinates: 33.5140°N 36.2789°E

Site history
- Built for: Syrian Armed Forces
- Events: 1973 Syrian General Staff Headquarters raid July 2025 Damascus airstrikes

The Hay'at al-Arkan (Arabic: هيئة الأركان العامة, lit. 'General Staff Headquarters') is the General Staff Command Building of the Syrian Armed Forces and the headquarters of Ministry of Defense. It is located in Umayyad Square in central Damascus. It is the main seat of the Chief of the General Staff.

== History ==
On 9 October 1973, Israeli Air Force F‑4 Phantom II jets struck the Syrian General Staff Headquarters in Damascus' upscale Abu Rummaneh district during the Yom Kippur War. The targeted raid, aimed at crippling Syria's military command, resulted in significant damage to the building and surrounding military and governmental offices, with casualties reported among both military personnel and civilians.

On 26 September 2012, it was hit by two explosions. Some reports state that parts of the building were set on fire by the explosions.

On 16 July 2025, the Israeli Air Force bombed the entrance and two of its four facades to the headquarters in Damascus as a warning, citing security concerns over the Syrian army's deployment to Suwayda to restore order amid the July 2025 southern Syrian clashes. Heavier strikes targeted the Syrian military headquarters complex and caused vast damage and destruction to the main building. The Syrian Ministry of Health reported at least three killed and 34 injured as a result of the attacks.

== Bibliography ==
- Nicolle, David; Cooper, Tom (2004). Arab MiG-19 and MiG-21 Units in Combat. Combat Aircraft. UK: Osprey. ISBN 978-1-84176-655-3.
