= Binyan al-Hariri =

Syrian general

Brigadier General Binyan al-Hariri
- Native name: بنيان الحريري
- Nickname: Abu Fares Daraa (أبو فارس درعا)
- Born: Alma, Daraa, Syria
- Allegiance: Syrian opposition (2011–2024); Ahrar al-Sham (2011–2025); Syria (since 2025)
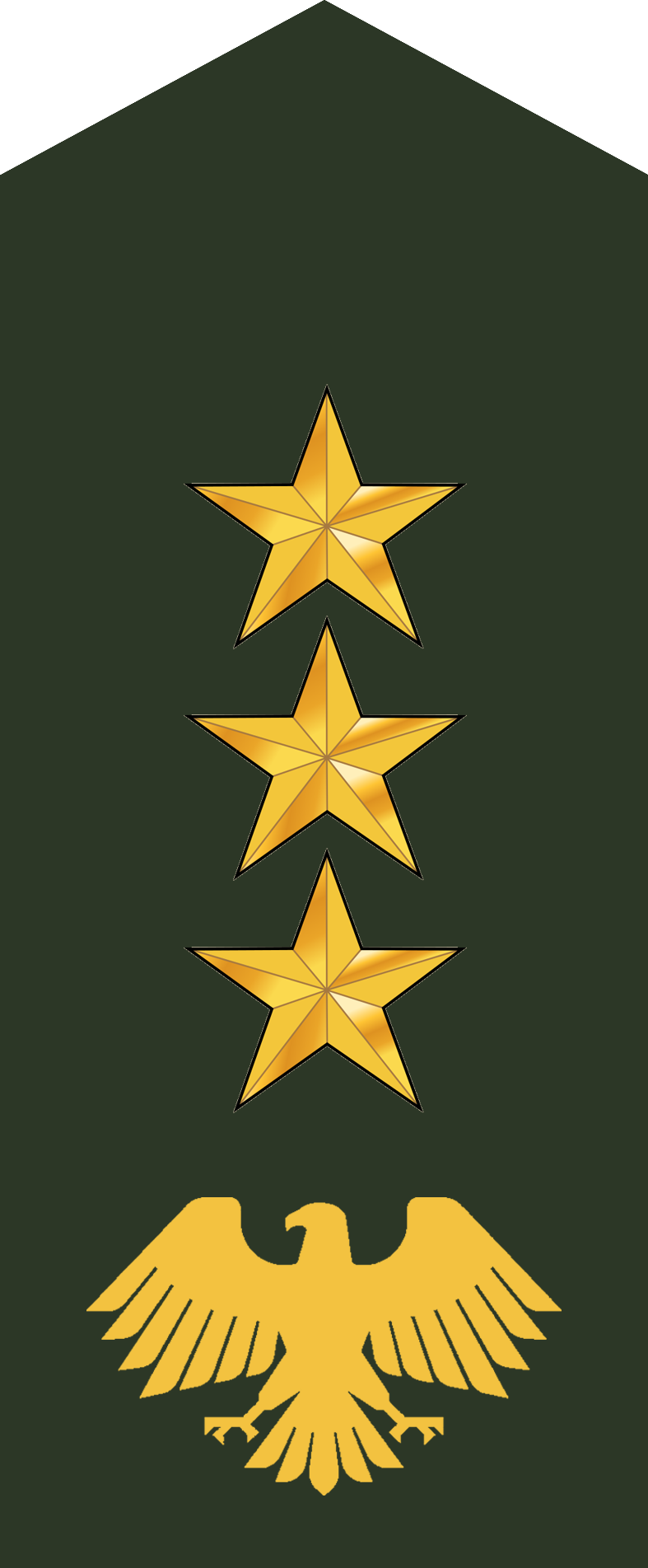
- Rank: Brigadier General
- Commands: 40th Division
- Conflicts: Syrian Civil War; Daraa Governorate campaign
- Education: Lebanese University; American University of Science and Technology; Fatih University; Idlib Military College

Binyan Ahmad al-Hariri (Arabic: بنيان أحمد الحريري) is a Syrian military officer serving as commander of the 40th Division of the Syrian Army, following the fall of the Assad regime.

== Early life and education ==
Al-Hariri was born in Alma, Daraa. He holds a law degree from the Lebanese University in Beirut. He also holds a degree in political science from the American University of Science and Technology and a certificate in strategic leadership from Fatih University.

Prior to the outbreak of the civil war, he served as a warrant officer in the Syrian Arab Army. In 2020, he attended the Idlib Military College and graduated as a colonel.

== Activity during the civil war ==
Al-Hariri defected from the Assad regime in 2011 and contributed to the formation of Ahrar al-Sham in Daraa Governorate, becoming a commander for one of the group's brigades. In 2018, after he was deported to opposition-held Idlib Governorate following the 2018 Southern Syria offensive, he managed "important" military fronts, including the coastal front.

== Post-Assad era ==
On 29 December 2024, he was promoted to a colonel alongside other former opposition figures.

On 22 January 2025, Syrian Minister of Defense Murhaf Abu Qasra announced that al-Hariri had been appointed commander of the 40th Division, a military division based in the Hauran region which consists of former opposition factions and military figures from Daraa, Suwayda, and Quneitra Governorates.
