= 40th Division (Syria) =

- Active: February 2025 – present
- Country: Syria
- Branch: Syrian Army
- Type: Infantry division
- Role: Security and stabilization
- Size: ~3,000 personnel
- Garrison/HQ: Daraa
- Nickname: Southern Division (initially)
- Equipment: Small arms, light vehicles
- Engagements: Druze insurgency in Southern Syria (2025–present); Southern Syria clashes (July 2025)

Commanders
- Current commander: Colonel Binyan al-Hariri

The commander of the division is Binyan Ahmad al-Hariri (Abu Fares). Initially, during the Syrian civil war, al-Hariri joined the Salafi-jihadist group Liwa al-Muhajireen wal-Ansar and later became the commander and co-founder of the Islamist-Salafi militant group Ahrar al-Sham, which fought in the conflict to establish an Islamic state governed by Sharia law.

Under the 40th Division, four brigades are expected to operate:

- Western Daraa Countryside Brigade (led by Ahmad al-Qassem (Abu Iyad))
- Daraa Brigade
- Suwayda Brigade
- Brigade (name/number unknown)
