= Abu Rummaneh =

Abu Rummaneh أبو رمانة
- Neighborhood
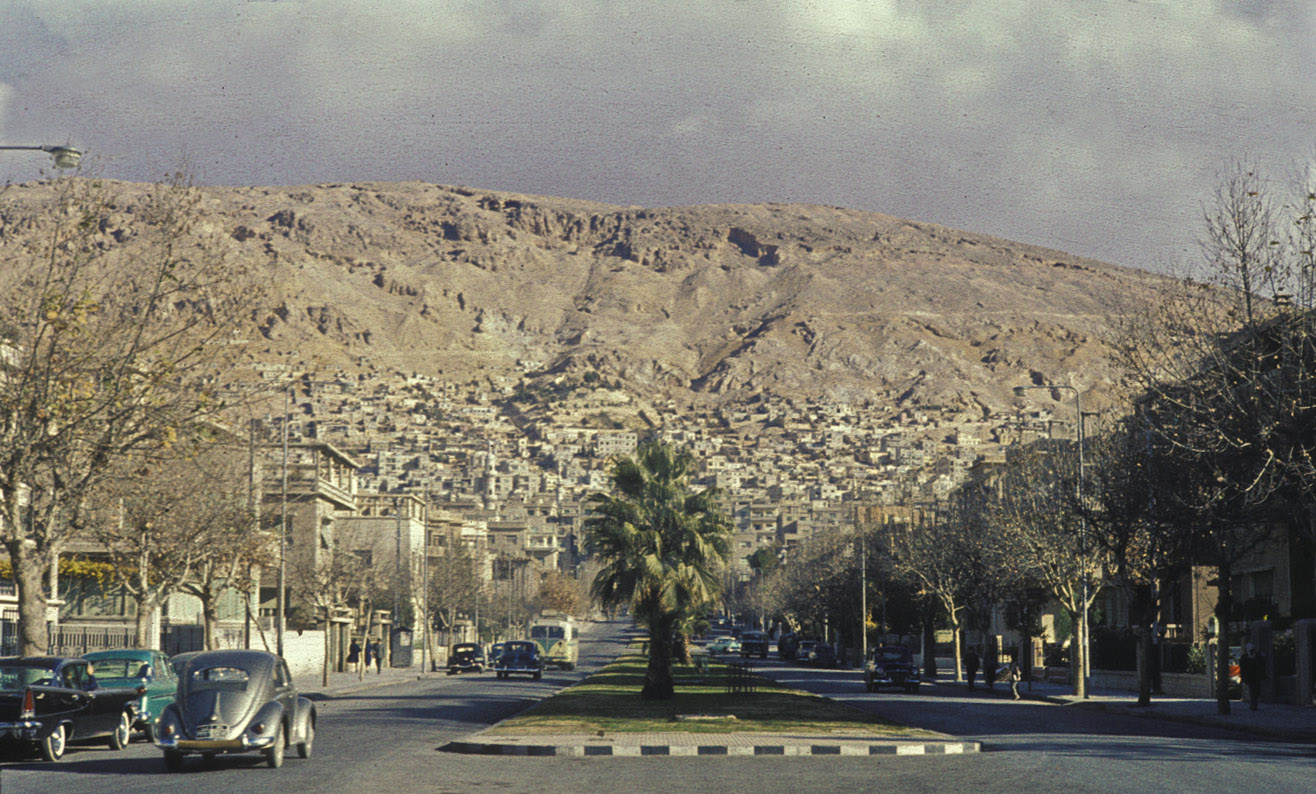
- Abu Rummaneh skyline, 1959

- Location in Syria
- Coordinates: 33°31′22″N 36°16′54″E
- Country: Syria
- Governorate: Damascus Governorate
- Subdistrict: Damascus
- Municipality: Qanawat

Population (2004)
  - Total: 6,421

Abu Rummaneh (Arabic: أبو رمانة) is an upscale neighborhood and district of the Muhajirin municipality in western Damascus, Syria. It had a population of 6,421 in the 2004 census.
