= Umayyad Square =

Location in Damascus, Syria

- Square
- ساحة الأمويين
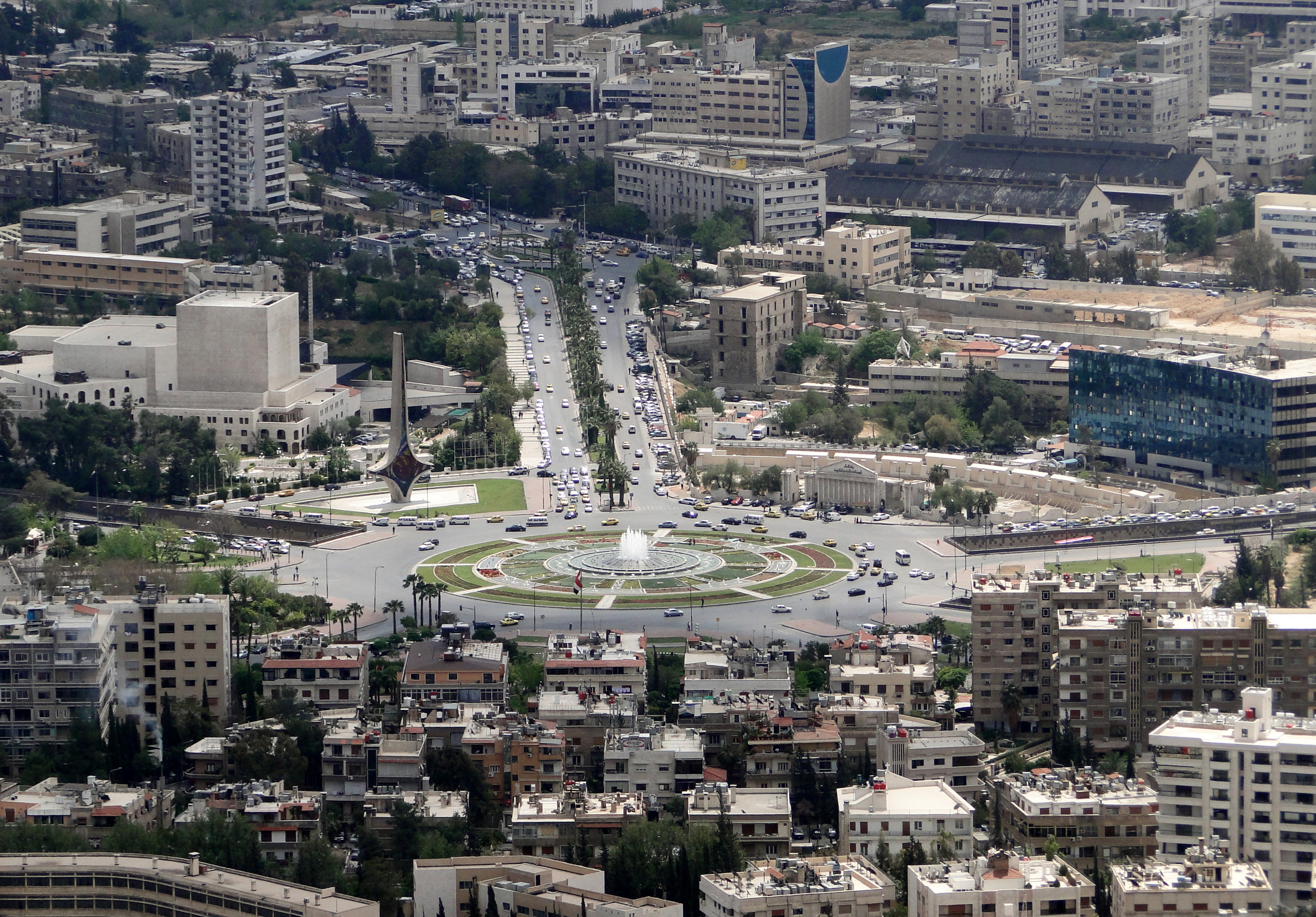
- Umayyad Square, Damascus
- Features: Damascene Sword monument Damascus Opera House; Ministry of Defense (Syria); Syrian Armed Forces headquarters
- Amenities: National Library of Syria; General Authority for Radio and Television building Sheraton Damascus Hotel
- Location: Damascus, Syria
- Location in Damascus, Syria
- Coordinates: 33°30′50″N 36°16′35″E

Umayyad Square (Arabic: ساحة الأمويين, romanized: Sāḥat al-Umawiyyīn, lit. 'Umayyads' Square') is a large and important square in Damascus, Syria. It connects the city center with several important highways and areas, and contains important buildings, including the Ministry of Defense, Syria's national Opera House and the headquarters of the Syrian Armed Forces.

The Damascene Sword monument, widely considered as the symbol of the city, stands in the square, and is considered a symbol and reminder "of the victories, strength and achievements of the Syrian people". The name of the square is a reference to the Umayyads who took Damascus as the capital of their caliphate in the 7th century.

Prior to the opening of the new 1.2 million sqm fairground to house the Damascus International Fair, the fair which was held annually since 1954 (before being cancelled in 2012 and reopening in 2017) was held in the square.

== Streets ==
The Umayyad square is connected with seven of the city's most important streets and highways:

- Beirut Street, which connects Damascus to the capital of Lebanon, Beirut
- Jawaharlal Nehru street, named after Jawaharlal Nehru, former prime minister of India
- Adnan al-Malki street, named after Adnan al-Malki, a Syrian Army officer and major 20th century political figure
- Mehdi Ben Barka street, named after Mehdi Ben Barka, a Moroccan politician
- Shukri al-Quwatli street, one of the city's most important streets, named after Shukri al-Quwatli, first president of an independent Syria
- Abu Bakr street, named after Rashidun caliph Abu Bakr
- Fayez Mansour street, named after Syrian Colonel Fayez Mansour who aced 14 victories against the Israeli Air Force

== Buildings on the Umayyad Square ==
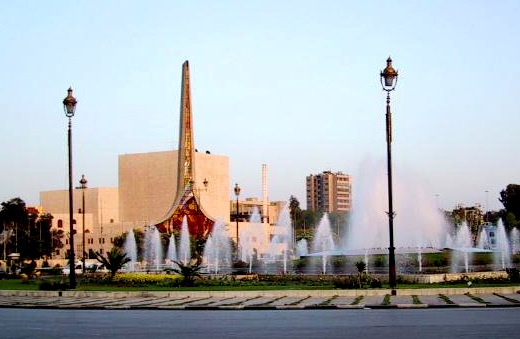
The Damascene Sword monument in front of the national opera house

- Damascus Opera House complex, which includes the Higher Institute of Dramatic Arts.
- National Library of Syria. Malki Street
- General Authority for Radio and Television building.
- the Hay'at al-Arkan, the Syrian Armed Forces General staff headquarters.
- Ministry of Defense.
- Sheraton Damascus Hotel.
