= Constituent and Parliamentary Assembly =

Legislative term of Syria's parliament from 1961 to 1963

Constituent and Parliamentary Assembly المجلس التأسيسي والنيابي

Type
- Type: Constituent assembly and unicameral of Second Syrian Republic

History
- Founded: 12 December 1961
- Disbanded: 8 March 1963 (Note: The Constituent and Parliamentary Assembly was elected for a four-year term. Its constituent character ended when the constitution was ratified on 13 September 1962, after which the Assembly continued to function de jure as a purely legislative body, but without convening again. See § Dissolution.)
- Preceded by: National Assembly
- Succeeded by: National Council for the Revolutionary Command

Leadership
- Speaker: Maamun al-Kuzbari (Independent) until 12 September 1962; Said al-Ghazzi (Independent) since 13 September 1962

Structure
- Seats: 172
- Political groups: People's Party (33); National Party (21); Ba'ath Party (20); Muslim Brotherhood (10); Arab Liberation Movement (4); Independents (84)

Elections
- First election: 1961

Meeting place
- Parliament Building, Damascus

The Constituent and Parliamentary Assembly (Arabic: المجلس التأسيسي والنيابي, romanized: al-Majlis al-Taʼsīsī wa-al-Niyābī) was the legislative body of Syria during the period following the September 1961 coup and seceding from the United Arab Republic.

Formed after the 1961 Syrian parliamentary election, the assembly combined both constituent and legislative functions. Its primary task was to draft a permanent constitution while also exercising parliamentary authority. Among its most significant acts were the election of Nazim al-Qudsi as President in December 1961, the reversal of socialist economic policies adopted during the UAR, and the adoption of a new constitution on 13 September 1962.

The assembly operated during a period of political instability marked by repeated military interventions, and remained in existence until the Ba'athist coup of 8 March 1963.

== Background ==
The 1961 provisional constitution, agreed between army command and the Council of Ministers following the September 1961 coup, consisted of eight articles. Article 1 acknowledged the heritage of the United Arab Republic and changed the country's name from the Syrian Republic to the Syrian Arab Republic, a name retained by every subsequent constitution and system of government. Article 8(b) provided that the President, Council of Ministers, and ministers would exercise executive authority under the provisions of the 5 September 1950 constitution until a new constitution was promulgated.

Article 2 provided for the people to elect a constituent and parliamentary assembly for a four-year term, while Article 7 provided for the assembly to elect a President of the Republic for a five-year term, following the same procedure set out in the 1950 constitution. Article 4 required the assembly to draft a new constitution within a maximum of six months, after which it would convert into a parliamentary chamber, a provision intended to settle in advance the controversy that had followed the simple-majority conversion of the 1949–1950 Constituent Assembly into a legislative chamber. Article 6 set out the legislative procedure to be followed during the drafting period: bills could be proposed by the government or by at least ten deputies; approved bills were promulgated by the President and published in the official gazette; and the President could return a bill to the assembly for reconsideration within ten days, after which, if the assembly insisted, it would be promulgated automatically.

The Assembly was elected by direct suffrage in December 1961, under a new electoral law issued by the caretaker government which amended the 1957 one. Seven seats were reserved for Bedouin representatives considered close to the authorities, bringing total membership to 172. The People's Party won a plurality, as in previous elections, allowing rightists and their independent allies a comfortable majority. The Muslim Brotherhood held several seats, including that of its leader, Issam al-Attar. Khalid al-Azm, an independent deputy for Damascus, received the highest number of votes nationally, followed by Maarouf al-Dawalibi of the People's Party, representing Aleppo.

At its first sitting, the assembly elected Maamun al-Kuzbari as Speaker, a choice that displeased the army, which had favoured Said al-Ghazzi, the outgoing Prime Minister. On 14 December 1961, the assembly elected Nazim al-Qudsi of the People's Party as head of state by near-unanimous vote; he was the only candidate after Khalid al-Azm withdrew, having been supported by the assembly's few leftist members and the independents aligned with them. The new head of state appointed Maarouf al-Dawalibi as Prime Minister, further angering the army.

== Government ==
Prime Minister	Party	Term of office	Government
Maarouf al-Dawalibi	People's Party	22 October 1961 – 27 March 1962	al-Dawalibi II
Bashir al-Azma	Independent	16 April – 17 September 1962	al-Azma
Khalid al-Azm	Independent	17 September 1962 – 8 March 1963	K. al-Azm V

== Bureau ==
Position	Name	Party	Tenure
Speaker	Maamun al-Kuzbari	Independent	12 December 1961 – 12 September 1962
Speaker	Said al-Ghazzi	Independent	13 September 1962 – 8 March 1963
Deputy Speaker	Rafiq Bashur	People's Party	12 December 1961 – 8 March 1963
Deputy Speaker	Abd al-Samad al-Futtayih	Independent	12 December 1961 – 8 March 1963
Secretary	Abd al-Latif al-Yunis	National Party	12 December 1961 – 8 March 1963
Secretary	Omar Awda al-Khatib	Muslim Brotherhood	12 December 1961 – 8 March 1963
Overseer	Najdat al-Najjari	National Party	12 December 1961 – 8 March 1963
Overseer	Shahin Mustafa Shahin	Independent	12 December 1961 – 8 March 1963
Overseer	Diab al-Mashi	People's Party	12 December 1961 – 8 March 1963

=== Elections of the Bureau ===
The Constituent and Parliamentary Assembly elected its bureau on the first sitting of the first ordinary session on 12 December 1961.

Election of the Speaker
Candidate	Party	Votes	%
Maamun al-Kuzbari	Independent	114	66.67
Jalal al-Sayyed	Independent	47	27.49
Total		161	100.00
Valid votes		161	94.15
Invalid/blank votes		10	5.85
Total votes		171	100.00
Registered voters/turnout		172	99.42

Election of the Deputy Speakers
Candidate	Party	Votes	%
Rafiq Bashur	People's Party	150	87.72
Abd al-Samad al-Futayh	Independent	128	74.85
Other candidates			
Total		278	100.00
Total votes		171	–
Registered voters/turnout		172	99.42

Election of the Secretaries
Candidate	Party	Votes	%
Abd al-Latif al-Yunis	National Party	106	62.35
Omar Awda al-Khatib	Muslim Brotherhood	92	54.12
Other candidates			
Total		198	100.00
Total votes		170	–
Registered voters/turnout		172	98.84

Election of the Overseers
Candidate	Party	First round		Second round	
Candidate	Party	Votes	%	Votes	%
Najdat al-Najjari	National Party			74	43.53
Shahin Mustafa Shahin	Independent politician			68	40.00
Diab al-Mashi	People's Party			50	29.41
Khalid al-Sarhani	Independent			49	28.82
Uthman Hasan Esber	People's Party			46	27.06
Ibrahim Tayfur	National Party			40	23.53
Hasan Abd al-Karim	People's Party			32	18.82
Total				359	100.00
Total votes		170	–	170	–
Registered voters/turnout		172	98.84	172	98.84

== Members ==
Party	Members
People's Party	35 / 172 (20%)
National Party	20 / 172 (12%)
Ba'ath Party	19 / 172 (11%)
Muslim Brotherhood	9 / 172 (5%)
Arab Liberation Movement	5 / 172 (3%)
Independent	84 / 172 (49%)

== List of sessions ==
- 1st ordinary session: 12–23 December 1961
- 1st special session: 8 January – 28 February 1962
- 2nd ordinary session: 1–27 March 1962
- 2nd special session (held at Khalid al-Azm's residence): 11–13 September 1962

== National Security Council ==
A National Security Council was established by decree under the thirty-day caretaker government of Izzat al-Nuss, intended to provide a framework for cooperation and consultation between the highest civilian and military authorities. Chaired by the President of the Republic, it included the Prime Minister, the army's commander-in-chief, and senior officers, who together outnumbered the ministers on the council, and was tasked with deciding major domestic and foreign policy directions.

In practice, the President, the Prime Minister, and their ministers showed little interest in the council, viewing it as a body imposed by the military on the legitimate civilian authorities to control executive and legislative decisions; it was never developed into an effective institutional forum, and the constitution drafted by the Constituent Assembly made no reference to it among the institutions of the republic. Of the council's intended biweekly meetings, two proved particularly consequential: one concerning the review of socialist measures adopted during the union with Egypt, and one concerning the Constituent Assembly itself.

== Political instability ==
The assembly operated during a turbulent period marked by frequent changes in government, rivalries between political parties, and continued military interference in politics.

In early 1962, the army pressed President al-Qudsi and Prime Minister al-Dawalibi to pass legislation through the Constituent Assembly amending the socialist measures adopted under Gamal Abdel Nasser's rule during the union period, in line with a joint army–government declaration calling for a moderate form of socialism. The bills, drafted at the army's direction by Colonel Abd al-Karim al-Nahlawi and approved by the National Security Council, were passed to the government and then to the Constituent Assembly, whose right-wing majority abolished the socialist measures outright rather than merely amending them, reportedly with the tacit agreement of the government and possibly the President. Feeling deceived, the army demanded that the President withhold his assent to the legislation, dismiss the government, lift the parliamentary immunity of certain deputies, reduce the assembly's remaining term to six months from the constitution's adoption rather than eighteen, and call new elections under a new electoral law. President al-Qudsi refused, denying any intention of interfering with the assembly's work or violating the provisional constitution.

On 28 March 1962, Colonel al-Nahlawi, backed by mostly Damascene officers, carried out his second coup in six months. President al-Qudsi, the Prime Minister, most of the government, and a large number of deputies were arrested, and the Constituent Assembly was dissolved. The President was forced to resign in writing at army headquarters before being transferred to al-Mazza military hospital. The coup divided the army: some officers, mostly leftists, supported it merely as a means of amending rather than abolishing the Nasser-era socialist measures, while pro-unity Nasserist officers saw it as an opportunity to restore union with Egypt; others remained cautiously neutral.

On 31 March 1962, army units in Homs mutinied under Brigadier General Badr al-A'sar, commander of the central region, joined by units and officers — many of them Ba'athists and Nasserists discharged from the army after the collapse of the union in September 1961. The mutiny was directed not against army leadership or the country's de facto ruler, General Abd al-Karim Zahr al-Din, but against Colonel al-Nahlawi and the Damascene officers around him. General Zahr al-Din convened a military conference in Homs on 1 April 1962 to prevent the mutiny spreading; its resolutions included the immediate expulsion of al-Nahlawi and his supporters from Syria, reconstitution of army high command, a review of terms for possible reunification with other Arab states including Egypt, amnesty for those involved in the mutiny, and formation of a non-partisan transitional civilian government excluding military figures. Zahr al-Din accepted all the conference's demands.

A second mutiny broke out on 2 April 1962 in Aleppo, led by Colonel Louai al-Atassi, commander of the eastern region, and Colonel Jassem Alwan, a Nasserist officer discharged from the army after the end of the union. Alwan announced over Aleppo radio the restoration of union with Egypt and requested Egyptian military and logistical support. Army command sent an armoured unit, supported by aircraft, which recovered the city with almost no fighting; Alwan fled and al-Atassi surrendered. Both officers were subsequently sent abroad, and army command granted amnesty to all participants in the Homs and Aleppo mutinies.

=== 1962 Jazira census ===
In August 1962, a month before the adoption of the 1962 constitution, the al-Azma government conducted a population census in Jazira Governorate under controversial circumstances, stripping an estimated 120,000 Kurds, classified as ajanib ("foreigners"), of their Syrian citizenship; those who did not participate in or failed the census were classified as maktoumeen ("unregistered") and left in an even more precarious legal status. By 2011, the stateless population resulting from the census had grown to more than 300,000 people.

Following the 2004 Qamishli riots, which left around 65 people dead and 165 injured, President Bashar al-Assad promised to resolve the issue. No action followed until April 2011, amid the outbreak of the Syrian uprising, when Assad issued Legislative Decree No. 49, granting Syrian Arab nationality to those registered as ajanib in Hasakah; the decree made no provision for the maktoumeen, who remained stateless.

In January 2026, the transitional government led by Ahmed al-Sharaa issued a further decree granting Syrian citizenship, along with Kurdish-language rights, to Kurdish Syrians who remained stateless, marking the first time such rights had been formally recognised.

== Restoration and adoption of the 1962 constitution ==
Following the failed coup and the two mutinies, army leadership consulted political leaders not in detention on restoring legitimate government, while stressing it had no intention of joining any government itself. On their advice, the army declined to accept President al-Qudsi's resignation, allowing him to automatically resume office. Al-Qudsi agreed to return on condition that he receive a written mandate, signed by more than half the members of the Constituent Assembly, authorising him to assume both executive and legislative powers alongside a transitional government, and that more than half the assembly's members submit their resignations in writing.

The army set its own conditions for the President's release, requiring him to sign a secret agreement outlining the principles of Syrian policy going forward. The agreement, signed by al-Qudsi and General Zahr al-Din, committed the President to a non-aligned stance toward all political parties, including the People's Party; to pursuing Syrian unity with other Arab states, foremost Egypt; to prioritising social justice and economic development, including a review of agrarian reform and company-regulation laws; to guaranteeing public freedoms and political and trade-union organisation; to treating National Security Council decisions as binding pending a new constitution defining the council's powers; to ensuring the army's commander-in-chief exercised the full powers of the Minister of Defence; to having a committee, appointed by the President in agreement with the government, draft a new constitution to be put to referendum after free public debate and approval by the National Security Council; and to enacting a new electoral law and holding free elections.

President al-Qudsi was released from al-Mazza military hospital upon signing this agreement and receiving the written resignations and mandate from more than half the assembly's members. In April 1962, Bashir al-Azma, a centre-left politician and former Minister of Health during the union period, formed a government by joint agreement between the President and the army, but without parliamentary approval, since the army had dissolved the assembly the previous month. His government's most significant act was to amend by decree the legislation the Constituent Assembly had passed abolishing the union-era socialist measures. A committee to draft the new constitution, as envisaged under the al-Qudsi–Zahr al-Din agreement, was never established.

By June 1962, some members of the dissolved assembly had begun meeting informally at the home of former Prime Minister Khalid al-Azm to discuss restoring constitutional life; most, encouraged by al-Azm, signed a statement disavowing any intention of reversing the al-Azma government's decree restoring the socialist measures, so as to reassure the army. As Bashir al-Azma's resignation became imminent, a group representing the assembly's main political currents met with President al-Qudsi and, with the exception of Ba'ath Party leader Akram al-Hourani, expressed a wish to see the dissolved assembly restored; the President did not object, though he recognised the army was largely opposed.

Seeking to persuade senior army officers to allow the assembly to meet one final time to "dissolve itself," al-Qudsi referred the matter to a special National Security Council meeting, where some senior right-wing officers sided with him against the army commander-in-chief, who remained reluctant to allow the assembly to convene even once more. The President ultimately accepted the army's conditions and informed the commander-in-chief that informal consultations with assembly members indicated most parliamentarians wished to see Khalid al-Azm, rather than Bashir al-Azma, appointed Prime Minister. General Zahr al-Din initially objected, since al-Azm was unpopular among pro-unity officers for having opposed union with Egypt since 1958 in favour of federal union, and among leftist officers for his strong support of the March 1962 legislation abolishing the socialist measures; the army ultimately agreed.

Khalid al-Azm had already prepared a list of amendments to the Constituent Assembly's draft constitution and a plan for the legitimate transfer of power, which was presented to the President and the assembly's main parliamentary leaders for approval. It was agreed that the Constituent and Parliamentary Assembly would convene at Khalid al-Azm's private residence to adopt the new constitution in one or two sittings, with amendments allowing the government to be granted legislative powers, the President to appoint the Prime Minister without a further assembly vote once confidence had been granted, the government to be given the right to dissolve the Chamber (with new elections to follow within one year, without requiring the dissolving government's own resignation), and existing legislative decrees to remain in force pending amendment under the new constitution.

The Assembly convened at Khalid al-Azm's residence on 11 September 1962, with 39 of the 172 deputies absent. At the President's explicit request, Speaker Maamun al-Kuzbari did not preside; his deputy, Rafiq Bashur, chaired the sitting instead. Al-Azm's plan was referred to a special committee, and before the sitting closed, the assembly voted to adopt the 1950 constitution, as amended, as the constitution of Syria. A brief second sitting was held the following day to reaffirm the legitimacy of the session taking place outside the parliament building, while the special committee examined the proposed amendments. A third sitting was held on 13 September 1962, attended by all but fifteen deputies, at which the committee's recommendations were approved, including provisions allowing the President to select the Prime Minister subject to a confidence vote extending to the whole cabinet; allowing the assembly to delegate its legislative powers to the Council of Ministers by absolute majority, with legislative decrees adopted under the President's chairmanship by a two-thirds majority of ministers; permitting dissolution of the sitting Chamber, with elections to follow within one year without requiring the dissolving government's resignation; and restoring the Court of Cassation, which had been abolished during the union with Egypt. With the adoption of these transitional provisions, the assembly's constituent character was formally ended, and it became, in law, a legislative chamber.

Khalid al-Azm informed the deputies that the President, under Article 11 of the new constitution, had specifically asked him to form a government. He then read his ministerial statement and requested a vote of confidence, which he received almost unanimously, 156 of 157 votes cast. Before the sitting closed, outgoing Speaker Maamun al-Kuzbari's resignation letter was read out, and the deputies elected Said al-Ghazzi in his place. Ten deputies then introduced a bill granting the government legislative powers for one year, which was adopted. This sitting brought to a close the assembly's final session — the last for a body first elected in December 1961 and dissolved by the army in March 1962, but permitted to reconvene once to adopt a new constitution and grant a final vote of confidence to what proved to be the last government of the Second Syrian Republic.

== Dissolution ==
The army remained susceptible to infiltration by rival political currents. Colonel al-Nahlawi, expelled from the country since April 1962, returned to Syria in early January 1963 in collusion with officers in the intelligence services and army. He met with close allies and, with loyal Damascene officers, attempted to organise a third coup in fifteen months. The attempt took place on 13 January 1963, when armoured units from garrisons around Damascus (al-Kiswah, Qatana, al-Qabun) moved toward the capital, but army headquarters' defences remained loyal to army command and neutralised the units. The attempt failed decisively; al-Nahlawi returned into exile as a military attaché in Indonesia, and his associates were arrested.

The army emerged weakened from this episode. Unlike the previous coups, this one had been organised and carried out solely by Damascene right-wing officers, unsettling the fragile balance of power within the army that had persisted since the collapse of the union with Egypt. The expulsion of the pro-Nahlawi Damascene right-wing officers opened the way for officers from other regions holding different political convictions — including a small number of leftist Ba'athist and Nasserist officers who had not been discharged after the separation from Egypt, or even during the union period in the Ba'athists' case — to expand their influence, ultimately persuading neutral, non-politicised officers to support the overthrow of the Second Republic for good on 8 March 1963.

While it never convened after its last sitting on 13 September 1962, the Assembly technically remained in place until 8 March 1963, when it was formally dissolved following the coup led by the Arab Socialist Ba'ath Party in alliance with Nasserists and independent officers.

The coup marked the end of parliamentary and democratic life in Syria. Legislative authority would be vested in the military-dominated National Council for the Revolutionary Command.

== See also ==
- Constituent Assembly (Syria, 1928–1929)
- Constituent Assembly (Syria, 1949–1950)
