= Supreme Arab Revolutionary Command of the Armed Forces =

Group of military officers who staged the 1961 Syrian coup d'état

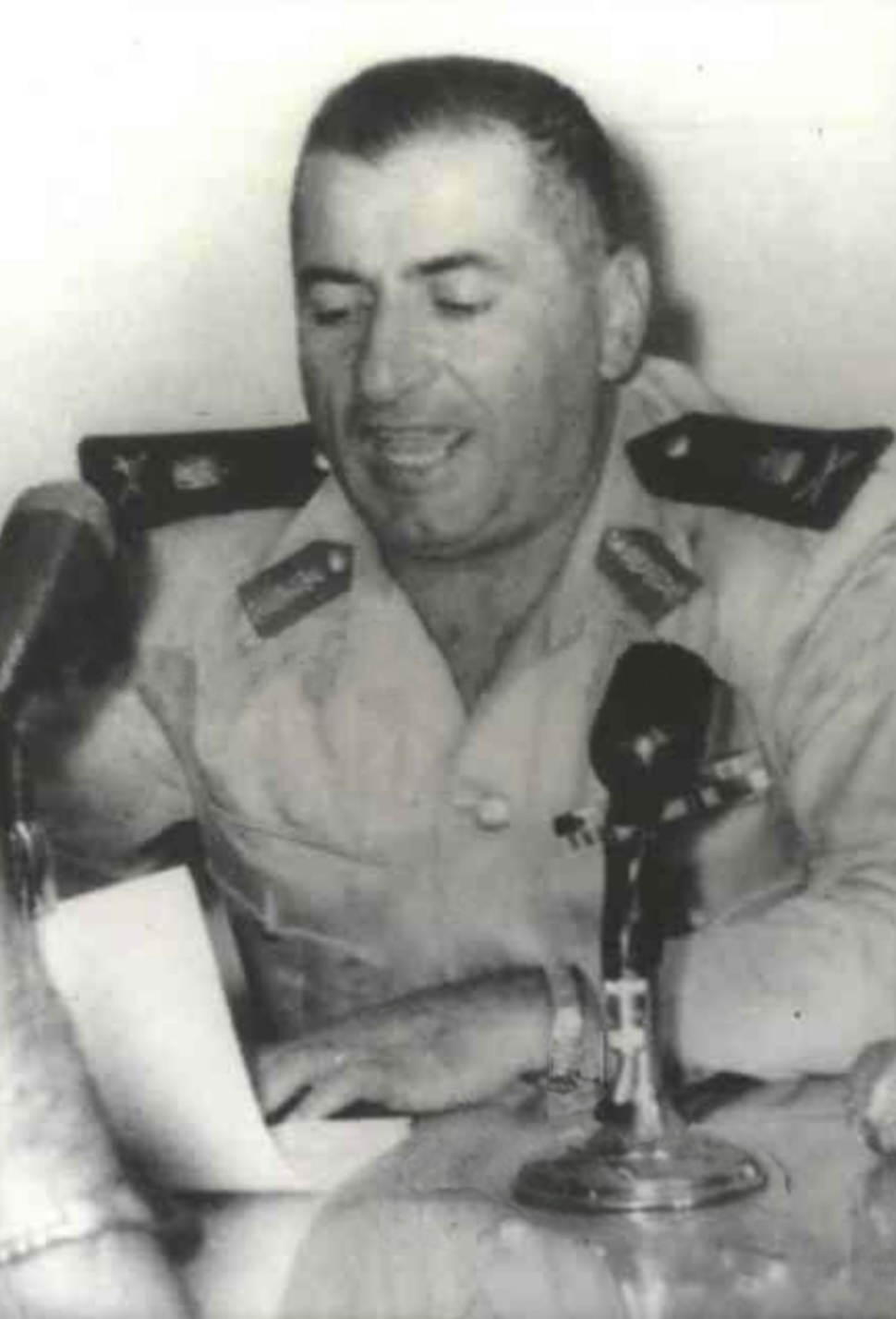
Abdel Karim Zahreddine broadcast a communique from the SARCAF, 1961

The Supreme Arab Revolutionary Command of the Armed Forces or SARCAF (Arabic: القيادة الثورية العربية العليا للقوات المسلحة) was an organized group of Syrian military officers who staged a military coup in September 1961 and declared Syria's secession from the United Arab Republic. It is sometimes also described as a short-lived military junta.

== History ==
=== Creation of the UAR ===
In 1958, Egypt and Syria united to form the United Arab Republic. Although many in Syria expected Egyptian President Gamal Abdel Nasser to allow Syrians to govern the Syrian part of the UAR, they were very wrong: Nasser installed Egyptians in almost all important positions. Nasser established a new provisional constitution proclaiming a 600-member National Assembly with 400 members from Egypt and 200 from Syria, and the disbanding of all political parties. During the winter and the spring of 1959–60, Nasser slowly squeezed prominent Syrians out of positions of influence. In the Syrian Ministry of Industry, for example, seven of the top thirteen positions were filled by Egyptians. In the General Petroleum Authority, four of the top six officials were Egyptian. Mustafa al-Barudi, the Syrian Minister of Propaganda, stated that 'the smallest member of the (Egyptian) retinue thought that he had inherited our country. [Egyptians] spread "like octopuses" everywhere.' Nasser was not able to address problems in Syria completely, because they were new to him, and instead of appointing Syrians to run Syria, he assigned this position to Amer and Abdel Hamid Sarraj (a Syrian army official and Nasser sympathizer).

=== Formation and creation ===
SARCAF arose from officers of the Syrian army (which during the UAR was known as the First Field Army) who were dissatisfied with their position and the position of their country within the UAR, as well as the complete hegemony of the Egyptians in Syria that had emerged as a result of unification. Syrian army officers resented being subordinate to Egyptian officers, and Syrian Bedouin tribes received money from Saudi Arabia to prevent them from becoming loyal to Nasser. The exact composition of the SARCAF is unknown, as is the exact number of its members. However, it is known that at least several army officers were members: Abdul Karim al-Nahlawi, Haydar al-Kuzbari, Maamun al-Kuzbari, and Abd al-Karim Zahreddine.

=== Coup d'etat and UAR's dissolution ===
On September 28, 1961, the organization (together with several Syrian politicians) launched a successful coup d'état against the UAR's government in Syria. By September 30, the SARCAF controlled the entire country, with the exception of the area around the port of Latakia and the Dumayr airfield north of Damascus. The SARCAF had installed a civilian provisional government headed by Prime Minister and Acting Chief of State Maamun Kuzbari, which governed pending the holding of elections for a Constituent Assembly. The Assembly was later duly elected, under terms of an electoral law which had existed prior to Syrian union with Egypt, and the Assembly in turn elected Nazim al-Qudsi as president, and the Army declared it had “returned to its barracks” and was turning the reins of government over to civilian authorities. SARCAF announced the formation of a Syrian cabinet headed by Mamun Kuzbari as prime minister, foreign minister, and defense minister, and empowered the cabinet to rule by decree. SARCAF soon began launching propaganda attacks on Nasser's person (Nasser responded in kind in his speeches). The political orientation of individual members of the military junta that carried out the coup remained unclear, although some were clearly right-wing.

The exact date of the end of the junta's rule is unknown: the latest potential date is March 1963, when another coup d'état took place in Syria, which overthrew the entire old system of government and brought to power a new military junta and the Ba'ath Party. But the junta presumably ceded power to a civilian government in the same year, 1961.
