= Maamun al-Kuzbari government =

1961 Syrian government

- 61st government of the Syrian Arab Republic

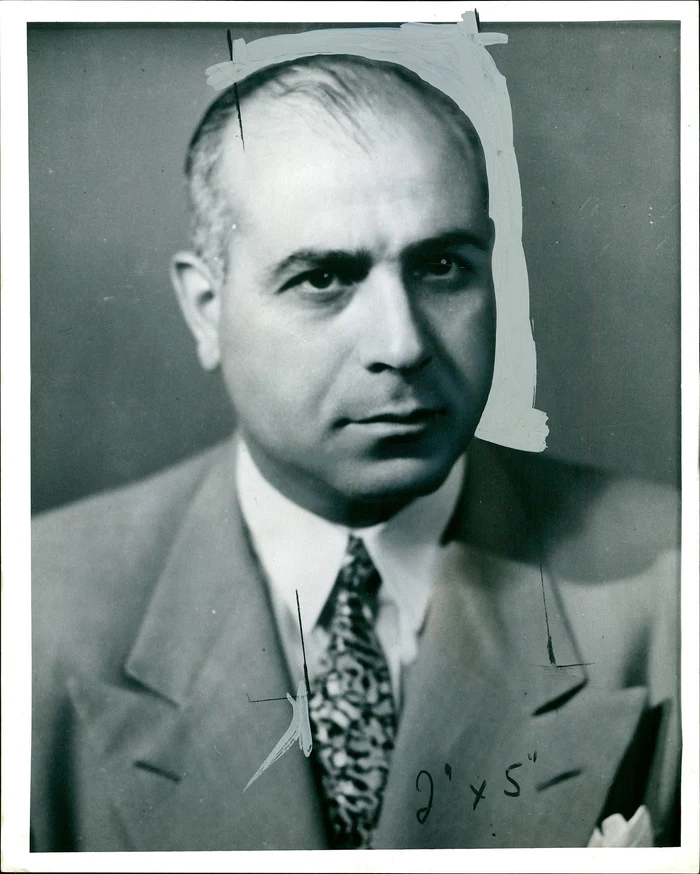
- Date formed: 29 September 1961
- Date dissolved: 20 November 1961

People and organisations
- President: Vacant
- Prime Minister: Maamun al-Kuzbari
- No. of ministers: 12
- Member parties: ▌People's Party; ▌National Party; ▌Independent

History
- Incoming formation: Secession from UAR
- Legislature term: None
- Predecessor: Abdel Nasser VI
- Successor: al-Nuss

The Maamun al-Kuzbari government was the sixty-first government in the history of modern Syria. Formed on 29 September 1961 by Decree No. 1, it was the first government established following Syria's secession from the United Arab Republic and the restoration of the Syrian Arab Republic. The cabinet was headed by Maamun al-Kuzbari, who played a leading role in the transitional political arrangements that followed the collapse of the union with Egypt.

The government was primarily tasked with re-establishing Syrian state institutions and overseeing the transition to an independent political order after more than three years of union with Egypt. As a provisional administration, it sought to restore constitutional governance and stabilise the country during a period of significant political uncertainty.

The government remained in office until 20 November 1961, when it was succeeded by a new government as part of the continuing process of political reorganisation in post-union Syria.

== Composition ==
Portfolio	Minister	Took office	Left office	Party
Prime Minister	Maamun al-Kuzbari	29 September 1961	20 November 1961	Independent
Minister of Foreign Affairs	Maamun al-Kuzbari	29 September 1961	20 November 1961	Independent
Minister of Defense	Maamun al-Kuzbari	29 September 1961	20 November 1961	Independent
Minister of Finance	Leon Zamarya	29 September 1961	20 November 1961	National Party
Minister of Supply	Leon Zamarya	29 September 1961	20 November 1961	National Party
Minister of Health and Ambulance	Farhan al-Jandali	29 September 1961	20 November 1961	People's Party
Minister of Interior	Adnan al-Quwatli	29 September 1961	20 November 1961	National Party
Minister of Education and National Guidance	Izzat al-Nuss	29 September 1961	20 November 1961	Independent
Minister of Economy	Awad Barakat	29 September 1961	20 November 1961	Independent
Minister of Industry	Awad Barakat	29 September 1961	20 November 1961	Independent
Minister of Agriculture and Agrarian Reform	Amin Nazif	29 September 1961	1 November 1961	
Minister of Agriculture and Agrarian Reform	Said al-Sayyed	1 November 1961	20 November 1961	
Minister of Justice	Ahmad Sultan	29 September 1961	20 November 1961	Independent
Minister of Endowments	Ahmad Sultan	29 September 1961	20 November 1961	Independent
Minister of Public Works and Transportation	Abdul Rahman Houriyeh	29 September 1961	20 November 1961	
Minister of Planning, Rural and Municipal Affairs	Numan al-Azhari	29 September 1961	20 November 1961	Independent
Minister of Social Affairs and Labor	Fouad al-Adil	29 September 1961	20 November 1961	Independent
Minister of State for Propaganda, News, Radio and Television	Mustafa al-Baroudi	30 September 1961	20 November 1961	Independent

== See also ==
- Council of Ministers (Syria)
- List of Syrian governments
- Government ministries of Syria
- List of prime ministers of Syria
