= 1961 Syrian presidential election =

- 14 December 1961
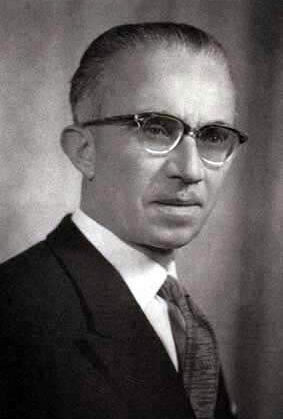
Candidate	Nazim al-Qudsi	Dahham al-Hadi	Fahd al-Dandal
Party	People's	Independent	Independent
Electoral vote	153	2	1
Percentage	89%	1.1%	0.6%
Acting Chief of State before election
Maamun al-Kuzbari
Independent
Elected President
Nazim al-Qudsi
People's

The 1961 Syrian presidential election was held on 14 December 1961, when the Syrian Constituent and Parliamentary Assembly elected Nazim al-Qudsi as President of the Syrian Republic by 153 votes out of 172. The election took place shortly after Syria's secession from the United Arab Republic in September 1961, and marked the country's return to parliamentary democratic governance. Al-Qudsi, described by contemporary observers as a moderate conservative, immediately began moves to form Syria's first parliamentary-based government since the break with Egypt.

== Background ==
Syria had been part of the United Arab Republic since 1958. Following a military coup on 28 September 1961, Syria declared its secession from the UAR. A provisional government was established, and elections were held for a new parliament of 172 deputies. The newly elected assembly then proceeded to elect a President of the Republic.

== Candidates ==
Khalid al-Azm, a left-wing political figure and former Prime Minister who had previously contested the 1955 Syrian presidential election, had been considered al-Qudsi's main opponent. However, on the morning of election day, al-Azm withdrew his candidacy in order to, in his own words, "aid unification of the ranks of the new regime." A British Embassy despatch from Damascus dated 15 December 1961 noted that al-Azm's withdrawal gave al-Qudsi a virtually unopposed election, and that this withdrawal certainly added to his already strong claims for consideration.

== Results ==
Canditates	Parties	Votes	%
Nazim al-Qudsi	People's Party	153	88.95
Dahham al-Hadi	Independent	2	1.16
Fahd al-Dandal	Independent	1	0.58
Required majority		114 votes	Two-thirds of MPs
Valid votes		156	90.70
Blank and invalid votes		16	9.30
Total		172	100
Registered voters / turnout		172	100

== Inaugural address ==
Al-Qudsi's speech was described by the British Embassy as non-controversial in character; he mentioned no individual Arab or foreign state by name. He thanked the deputies for their confidence and spoke of his pride in the responsibility entrusted to him. He expressed regret that the renewal of parliamentary democracy in Syria should have arisen from the failure of hopes of creating a unified Arab homeland. He gave a brief summary of the Syrian Arabs' struggle for freedom over the preceding forty years, and paid tribute to the members of the revolutionary command who had opened the way to freedom and dignity.

Al-Qudsi declared a policy of non-alignment as the best contribution Syria could make to world peace, and expressed support for the principles of the United Nations Charter. He spoke of his hope that the parliamentary democratic system could be made to work successfully, and that the new constitution would be soundly based so as to function smoothly regardless of personalities. He referred to the importance of citizen welfare and the need to utilise the country's resources through carefully prepared development plans. He mentioned hopes of greater prosperity from the Euphrates Dam project and from the discovery of oil and other minerals. He closed with a tribute to the Syrian Arab Army for opening the way to freedom, and to the members of the provisional government who had carried out their duties impartially during the transition period.
