= Bashir al-Azma government =

1962 Syrian government

- 64th government of the Syrian Arab Republic

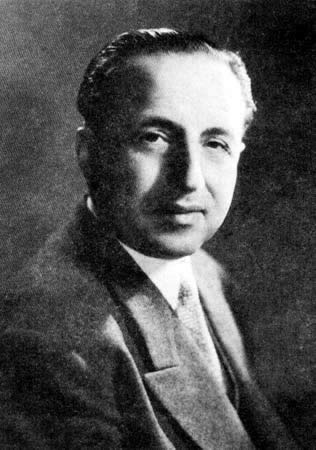
- Date formed: 16 April 1962
- Date dissolved: 17 September 1962

People and organisations
- President: Nazim al-Qudsi
- Prime Minister: Bashir al-Azma
- Deputy Prime Minister: Rashad Barmada
- No. of ministers: 14 (until June 1962); 15 (from June 1962)
- Member parties: ▌People's Party; ▌Ba'ath Party; ▌Independent
- Opposition parties: ▌National Party; ▌Muslim Brotherhood; ▌Arab Liberation

History
- Legislature term: Constituent and Parliamentary Assembly
- Predecessor: al-Dawalibi II
- Successor: K. al-Azm V

The Bashir al-Azma government was the sixty-first government in the history of modern Syria. Formed on 16 April 1962 by Decree No. 680, it was established as a transitional government during the period of political instability that followed Syria's secession from the United Arab Republic and the 1962 coup attempt. The decree officially described the government as a transitional ministry and appointed Bashir al-Azma as its prime minister.

The government was tasked with managing the transitional phase and preparing the country for a new political settlement. According to the decree establishing the cabinet, the Commander-in-Chief of the Army and Armed Forces was granted the powers and responsibilities of the Minister of Defence, reflecting the continuing influence of the military in Syrian political affairs.

The government remained in office until its resignation on 17 September 1962. Its brief tenure was part of the wider period of political uncertainty in Syria following the collapse of the union with Egypt and the struggle to restore a stable constitutional order.

== Composition ==
Portfolio	Minister	Took office	Left office	Party
Prime Minister	Bashir al-Azma	16 April 1962	17 September 1962	Independent
Deputy Prime Minister	Rashad Barmada	16 April 1962	17 September 1962	People's Party
Minister of Education	Rashad Barmada	22 December 1961	17 September 1962	People's Party
Minister of Broadcasting	Rashad Barmada	16 April 1962	20 June 1962	People's Party
Minister of Agrarian Reform	Ahmad Abdul-Karim	16 April 1962	17 September 1962	Independent
Minister of Social Affairs and Labor	Ahmad Abdul-Karim	16 April 1962	20 June 1962	Independent
Minister of Social Affairs and Labor	Rifaat Zureiq	20 June 1962	17 September 1962	Independent
Minister of Municipal and Rural Affairs	Riyad al-Madani	16 April 1962	17 September 1962	
Minister of Supply	Riyad al-Madani	16 April 1962	17 September 1962	
Minister of Foreign Affairs	Adnan al-Azhari	16 April 1962	20 June 1962	
Minister of Foreign Affairs	Jamal al-Fara	20 June 1962	17 September 1962	
Minister of Justice	Rashid Humeidan	16 April 1962	17 September 1962	
Minister of Endowments	Rashid Humeidan	16 April 1962	17 September 1962	
Minister of Finance	George al-Khoury	16 April 1962	17 September 1962	
Minister of Transportation	Subhi Kahalah	16 April 1962	17 September 1962	Independent
Minister of Planning	Subhi Kahalah	16 April 1962	17 September 1962	Independent
Minister of Culture and National Guidance	Abdul-Salam al-Ujeili	16 April 1962	20 June 1962	Independent
Minister of Culture and National Guidance	Omar Shakhashiro	20 June 1962	17 September 1962	Independent
Minister of Economy	Nihad al-Sibai	16 April 1962	20 June 1962	
Minister of Economy	George al-Khoury	20 June 1962	17 September 1962	
Minister of Health and Ambulance	Ihsan al-Rifai	16 April 1962	17 September 1962	Independent
Minister of Interior	Abd al-Halim Qaddur	16 April 1962	20 June 1962	Ba'ath Party
Minister of Interior	Aziz Abdul-Karim	20 June 1962	17 September 1962	Independent
Minister of Industry	Robert Ilyas	16 April 1962	17 September 1962	
Minister of Public Works	Robert Ilyas	16 April 1962	17 September 1962	
Minister of Information	Abdullah Abdul-Dayem	16 April 1962	20 June 1962	
Minister of Information	Abdul-Salam al-Ujeili	20 June 1962	17 September 1962	Independent
Minister of Agriculture	Abdul-Wahhab al-Aqqad	20 June 1962	17 September 1962	

Major General Abd al-Karim Zahreddine, Commander-in-Chief of the Army and Armed Forces, assumed the responsibilities and powers of the Minister of Defense.

== See also ==
- Council of Ministers (Syria)
- List of Syrian governments
- Government ministries of Syria
- List of prime ministers of Syria
