= Izzat al-Nuss government =

1961 Syrian government

- 62nd government of the Syrian Arab Republic

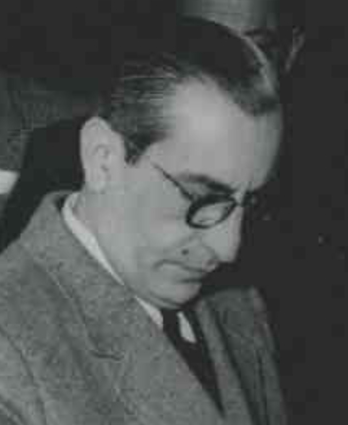
- Date formed: 20 November 1961
- Date dissolved: 22 December 1961

People and organisations
- President: Vacant
- Prime Minister: Izzat al-Nuss
- No. of ministers: 10

History
- Legislature term: None
- Predecessor: al-Kuzbari
- Successor: al-Dawalibi II

The Izzat al-Nuss government was the sixty-second government in the history of modern Syria. Formed on 20 November 1961 by Decree No. 329, it was established during the transitional period that followed Syria's secession from the United Arab Republic. The government was headed by Izzat al-Nuss and succeeded the government of Maamun al-Kuzbari.

The government assumed office amid continuing efforts to stabilise the country's political institutions and consolidate the restoration of the Syrian state after the end of union with Egypt. Its tenure was marked by the challenges of managing political divisions and defining the future direction of the post-union Syrian state.

The government remained in office for just over a month before resigning on 22 December 1961. Its brief tenure reflected the political uncertainty that characterised Syria during the early years following the dissolution of the United Arab Republic.

== Composition ==
Portfolio	Minister	Took office	Left office	Party
Prime Minister	Izzat al-Nuss	20 November 1961	22 December 1961	Independent
Minister of Defense	Izzat al-Nuss	20 November 1961	22 December 1961	Independent
Minister of Foreign Affairs	Izzat al-Nuss	20 November 1961	22 December 1961	Independent
Minister of Social Affairs and Labor	Fathallah Asyun	20 November 1961	22 December 1961	People's Party
Minister of Economy	Awad Barakat	29 September 1961	22 December 1961	Independent
Minister of Industry	Awad Barakat	29 September 1961	22 December 1961	Independent
Minister of Justice	Ahmad Sultan	29 September 1961	22 December 1961	Independent
Minister of Endowments	Ahmad Sultan	29 September 1961	22 December 1961	Independent
Minister of Public Works and Transportation	Abdul Rahman Houriyeh	29 September 1961	22 December 1961	
Minister of Finance	Numan al-Azhari	20 November 1961	22 December 1961	Independent
Minister of Supply	Numan al-Azhari	20 November 1961	22 December 1961	Independent
Minister of State for Propaganda, News and Broadcasting	Mustafa al-Baroudi	29 September 1961	22 December 1961	Independent
Minister of Rural and Municipal Affairs	Mustafa al-Baroudi	20 November 1961	22 December 1961	Independent
Minister of Agriculture and Agrarian Reform	Said al-Sayyed	1 November 1961	22 December 1961	
Minister of Education, Culture and National Guidance	Ahmad al-Samman	20 November 1961	22 December 1961	Independent
Minister of Interior	Abdul-Salam al-Tarmanini	20 November 1961	22 December 1961	Independent
Minister of Health and Ambulance	Abdul-Salam al-Tarmanini	20 November 1961	22 December 1961	Independent

== See also ==
- Council of Ministers (Syria)
- List of Syrian governments
- Government ministries of Syria
- List of prime ministers of Syria
