= Second Maarouf al-Dawalibi government =

1961–1962 Syrian government

- 63rd government of the Syrian Arab Republic
- Date formed: 22 December 1961
- Date dissolved: 27 March 1962

People and organisations
- President: Nazim al-Qudsi
- Prime Minister: Maarouf al-Dawalibi
- Deputy Prime Minister: Jalal al-Sayyed
- No. of ministers: 16
- Member parties: ▌People's Party; ▌National Party; ▌Arab Liberation; ▌Independent
- Opposition parties: ▌Ba'ath Party; ▌Muslim Brotherhood

History
- Election: 1961
- Legislature term: Constituent and Parliamentary Assembly
- Predecessor: al-Nuss
- Successor: al-Azma

The Second Maarouf al-Dawalibi government was the sixty-third government in the history of modern Syria. Formed on 22 December 1961 by Decree No. 15, it was headed by Maarouf al-Dawalibi and served during the early period of the restored Syrian state following Syria's secession from the United Arab Republic.

The government assumed office amid continuing efforts to redefine Syria's political system after the end of union with Egypt. Led by al-Dawalibi, a prominent Islamist and parliamentary politician, the cabinet sought to consolidate constitutional governance and address the political divisions that had emerged during the transition to independent statehood.

Despite these efforts, the government faced mounting political challenges and remained in office for only a short period. It resigned on 27 March 1962, reflecting the persistent instability that characterised Syrian politics in the aftermath of secession and the struggle to establish a durable political order.

== Composition ==
Portfolio	Minister	Took office	Left office	Party
Prime Minister	Maarouf al-Dawalibi	22 December 1961	27 March 1962	People's Party
Minister of Foreign Affairs	Maarouf al-Dawalibi	22 December 1961	27 March 1962	People's Party
Deputy Prime Minister	Jalal al-Sayyed	22 December 1961	27 March 1962	Independent
Minister of Agriculture	Jalal al-Sayyed	22 December 1961	27 March 1962	Independent
Minister of Defense	Rashad Barmada	22 December 1961	27 March 1962	People's Party
Minister of Education	Rashad Barmada	22 December 1961	27 March 1962	People's Party
Minister of Interior	Ahmad Qanbar	22 December 1961	27 March 1962	People's Party
Minister of Public Works	Muhammad al-Shawwaf	22 December 1961	27 March 1962	People's Party
Minister of Industry	Abd al-Rahman al-Hunaydi	22 December 1961	27 March 1962	Arab Liberation Movement
Minister of Justice	Mustafa al-Zarqa	22 December 1961	27 March 1962	Independent
Minister of Endowments	Mustafa al-Zarqa	22 December 1961	27 March 1962	Independent
Minister of Economy	Adnan al-Quwatli	22 December 1961	27 March 1962	National Party
Minister of Culture and National Guidance	Fouad al-Adil	22 December 1961	27 March 1962	Independent
Minister of Information	Fouad al-Adil	22 December 1961	27 March 1962	Independent
Minister of State	Mahmoud al-Azm	22 December 1961	27 March 1962	National Party
Minister of Health and Ambulance	Mahmoud al-Azm (acting)	22 December 1961	27 March 1962	National Party
Minister of Planning	Naum al-Suyufi	22 December 1961	27 March 1962	National Party
Minister of Transportation	Ahmad Ali Kamil	22 December 1961	27 March 1962	Independent
Minister of Municipal and Rural Affairs	Suhail al-Khoury	22 December 1961	27 March 1962	National Party
Minister of Agrarian Reform	Bakri al-Qabbani	22 December 1961	27 March 1962	People's Party
Minister of Finance	Rashid ad-Duqr	22 December 1961	27 March 1962	Independent
Minister of Supply	Rashid ad-Duqr	22 December 1961	27 March 1962	Independent
Minister of Social Affairs and Labor	Muhammad Abdin	22 December 1961	27 March 1962	Independent

== See also ==
- Council of Ministers (Syria)
- List of Syrian governments
- Government ministries of Syria
- List of prime ministers of Syria
