= Jamal al-Faisal =

Syrian military officer (1915–1995)

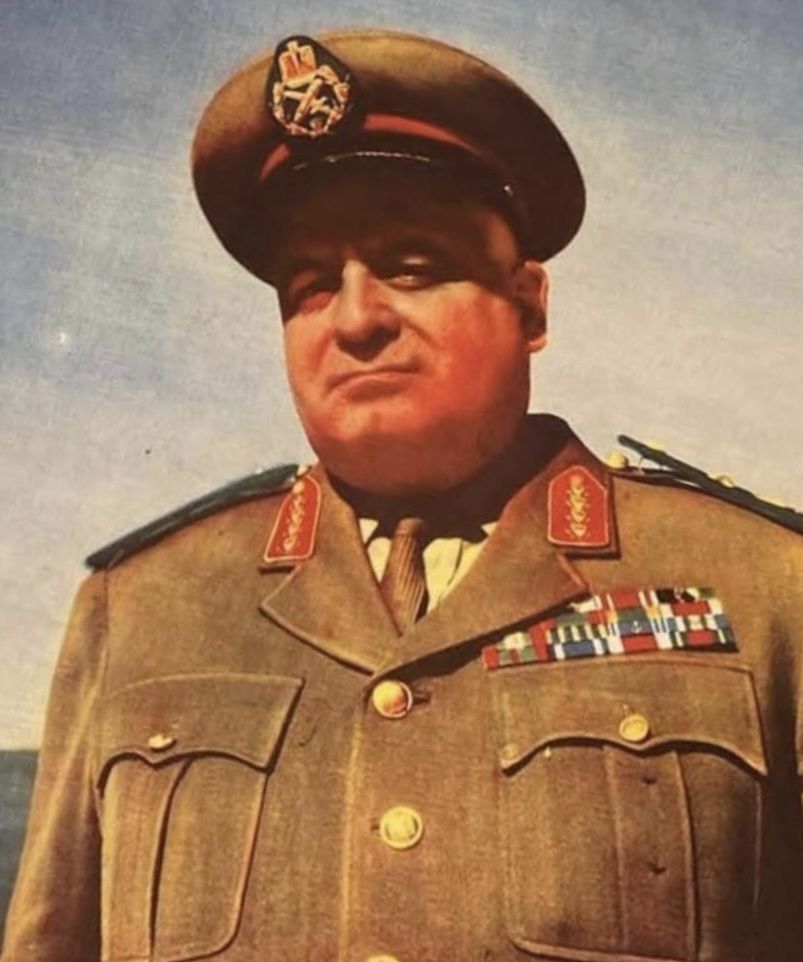
- Jamal in 1961
- Born: 1915; Homs, Ottoman Empire
- Died: September 28, 1995 (aged 79–80) Homs, Syria
- Allegiance: France (1939–1945); First Syrian Republic (1946–1950); Second Syrian Republic (1950–1958); United Arab Republic (1958–1961)
- Branch: Syrian Army
- Service years: 1939–1961
- Rank: General
- Conflicts: 1948 Arab–Israeli War
- Education: Homs Military Academy
- Spouse: Samira Al-Shahabi
- Children: 2

Jamal taher al-Faisal (1915 – 28 September 1995) was a Syrian military officer who played a significant role during the late 1950s and early 1960s. He served as the Chief of Staff of the Syrian Army from 1959 until 1961, succeeding Lieutenant General Afif al-Bizri.

== Early life ==
He was born in Homs to a father who was a merchant and mosque imam, and a mother from the influential Haraki family in Maarat al-Numan. He studied primary school at Manbaa Al-Irfan School and graduated from the Homs Military Academy in 1939, he then joined the Eastern Army under the French Mandate in Syria. In 1941, he was appointed assistant to the head of the Deir ez-Zor Garrison, before defecting from the French and joining the rebels when France bombed the capital, Damascus, on May 29, 1945. France sentenced him to death, and when the Syrian Army was founded on August 1, 1945 he was one of its first officers.

== Career ==
He was promoted to the rank of General in February 1959. Al-Faisal strongly opposed the dissolution of the union between Syria and Egypt and refused to join its ranks, declaring his absolute loyalty to the union and its president. He was retired in 1961 and wrote his memoirs.

During his tenure, al-Faisal was appointed as the commander of the First Army, a position he held from 1958 to 1961.

The UAR dissolved following a coup d'état in Syria on September 28, 1961, which led to Syria's secession from the union. After the secession coup, he traveled with Field Marshal Abdel Hakim Amer to Cairo and came back three months later, where he was met with legal charges.
