= 1961 Syrian coup d'état =

Military coup in splitting Syria from the UAR

- Part of the Arab Cold War
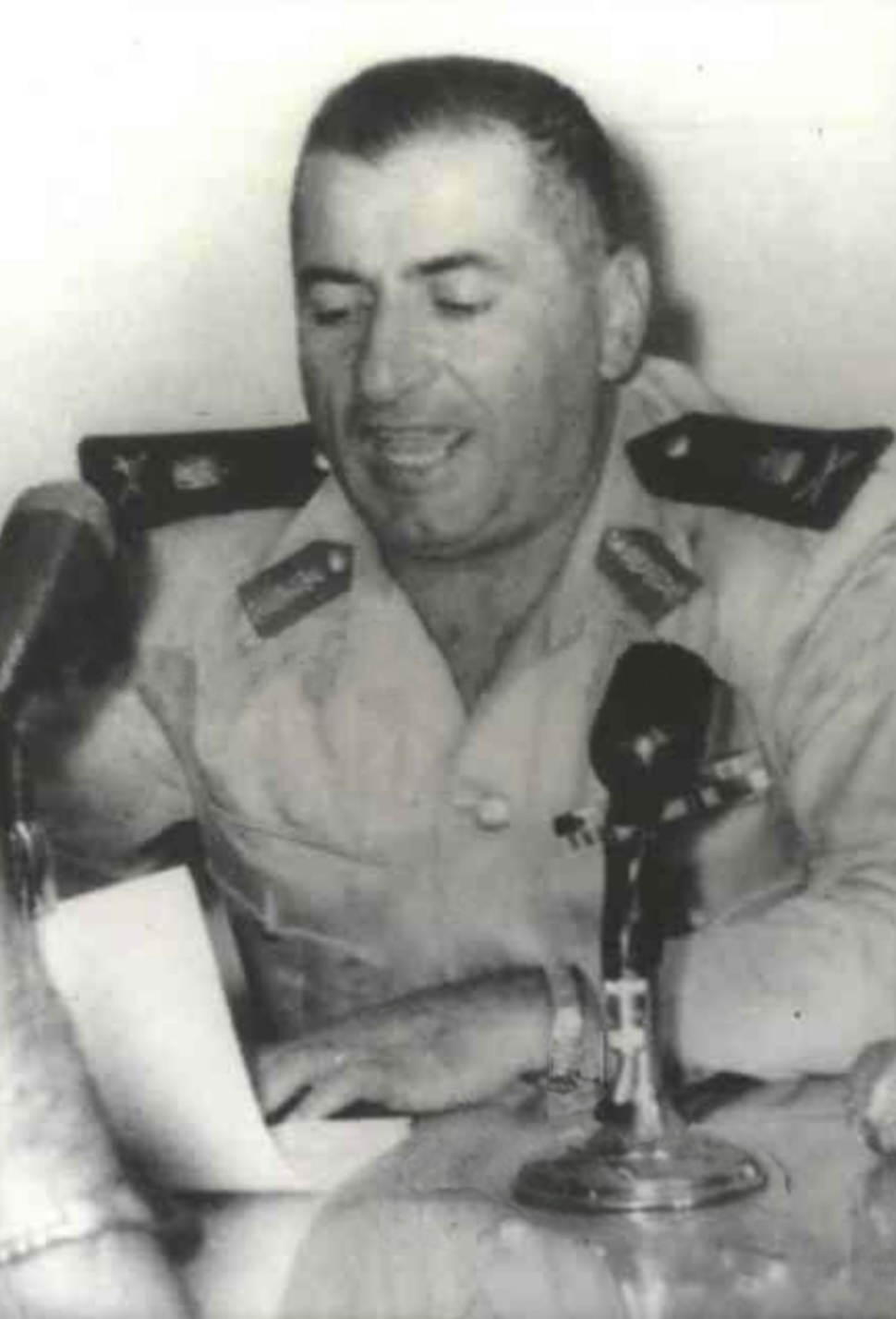
- Military officer Abdel Karim Zahreddine speaks on the radio about the dissolution of the UAR and the separation of Syria, September of 1961.
Date	28 September 1961
Location	Syria, United Arab Republic 33°30′47″N 36°17′31″E
Result	Coup successful: Syrian independence restored; Repeal of socialist UAR's laws, reversal of nationalization of several industries and currency unification; Writing of a new constitution, Constitution of 1950 in force; Series of coups and counter-coups culminate in the coup of 8 March 1963

Belligerents
United Arab Republic	Syrian Arab Republic; SARCAF; National Party; People's Party; Muslim Brotherhood; Communist Party; Ba'ath Party; Arab Liberation Movement

Commanders and leaders
Gamal Abdel Nasser; Abdel Hakim Amer; Abdel Hamid al-Sarraj; Maj.-Gen. Anwar al-Qadi; Lt.-Col. Jassem Alwan; Lt.-Gen. Jamal al-Faisal	Lt.-Col. Abd al-Karim al-Nahlawi; Lt.-Col. Haydar al-Kuzbari; Maamun al-Kuzbari; Maj.-Gen. Abdel Karim Zahreddine; Akram al-Hawrani; Nazim al-Kudsi; Maarouf al-Dawalibi; Salah al-Din al-Bitar; Capt. Mohamad Bahaa Mahmalji
- Location within Syria

The Syrian coup d'état of 1961 was an uprising by disgruntled Syrian Army officers on 28 September 1961, that resulted in the break-up of the United Arab Republic and the restoration of an independent Syrian Republic.

While the army had all the power, it chose not to rule directly and instead entrusted politicians from the traditional political parties of the earlier Syrian Republic to form the secessionist government. The restored country was a continuation of the Syrian Republic, but due to the influence of Nasserists and Arab nationalists it adopted a new name and became the Syrian Arab Republic. The restored regime was fragile and chaotic as internal army struggles influenced government policy. The traditionalist conservative politicians were increasingly out of touch with the radicalized army, which eventually swept the old order away in the coup of 8 March 1963.

== Economy ==
During the first months of 1961 state control over the Syrian economy was greatly increased. Izzat Traboulsi, the governor of the Central Bank of Syria, resigned at the end of January, warning about the dangers of nationalization and planned currency unification (Egypt and Syria still had their own currencies). On 5 February currency control was introduced, all foreign currency deposits were frozen, and the export of currency over 100 Syrian piasters from Syria was prohibited. The official goal was to increase currency reserves and to prevent the flight of capital, in reality just the opposite occurred as capital started to flee the country. On 10 February existing import licenses were revoked and importers had to reapply for new ones. On 4 March all banks had to become joint stock companies owned by UAR Arab citizens. Of the 16 banks operating in Syria at this time, 6 were UAR-Arab owned, 6 were owned by non-UAR Arabs and 7 were owned by non-Arabs.

From 20 February until 8 March 1961, Nasser was on his fifth and final visit in Syria, where he made speeches denouncing liberal economy and promoting a more socialist, state controlled model. He also promised that more factories and industrial infrastructure would be developed in the still largely agricultural country.

In early July government seized grain from storage and announced increased import of cattle in order to meet food and meat shortages that were caused by severe drought that had plagued Syria for three years.

In July 1961 Nasser announced his Second (Social) revolution by promoting a number of laws that nationalized most of the industries, toughened the agrarian reform, introduced employee management participation and profit sharing rights. As usual for Nasser, these laws were not discussed beforehand. Syrian elites were united in the realization that they were about to lose everything. This was coupled with the increasing dissatisfaction among army officers.

== Regional government abolished ==
On 16 August the Northern Executive council, the regional government of Syria since 1958, was abolished and all executive power was concentrated in Cairo. Syrian executives were transferred to Cairo and given positions of in the unified government. On 30 August the Northern Region was divided in 11 governorates with governors appointed by Nasser and accountable to the Minister of the Interior.

== Sarraj crisis ==
Abdel Hamid al-Sarraj was the last Syrian with real power in Syria. The President of the Northern Executive Council, Secretary General of the local branch of the ruling National Union, Syrian Minister of Interior and the long-time head of the secret police Sarraj had also been a significant supporter of Nasser and his rise to power with the United Arab Republic.

Already in June 1961 Nasser had told Sarraj about his plan to liquidate the local administration. As a way of removing him from the power, on 17 August 1961 Sarraj was made one of UAR's Vice Presidents with responsibility over internal affairs and moved to Cairo. On 13 August Nasser sent his confidant Abdel Hakim Amer (in the role of Inspector General) to take control in Damascus. On 26 August Amer and Sarraj both went to Cairo for a government meeting. On 15 September Sarraj returned to Damascus, and on 16 September he convened a meeting of Northern region's National Union Executive committee meeting.

On 16 September, Amer announced that Sarraj no longer had authority to convene such meetings, to which Sarraj replied that as an elected Secretary General of the regional National Union, he remained in power until the next Secretary General was elected. The National Union at that time was the UAR's ruling party and, at least in theory, had control over the government. To eliminate this conflict, on 18 September Nasser ordered the merger of Egyptian and Syrian National union branches.

A struggle over Sarraj's power base, the secret police, started. During 16–17 September Amer ordered the dismissal or arrest of leading security officers. On 17 September Amer published a decree prohibiting the arrest of any person without a warrant from the Attorney General. This curbed the freedom of the secret services to arrest anyone at will. At the same time, it was decided to unite the Egyptian and Syrian security services, bringing them under Cairo's control.

Amer also tried to rebuild positive contacts with Ba'ath politicians, including Salah ad-Din al-Bitar, who were enemies of Sarraj but supporters of Nasser's socialism, by awarding pensions to the former Ba’ath ministers on 17 September.

The struggle between Amer and Sarraj had caused further consolidation of all power structures in the hands of Cairo. As the week progressed, some underground parties started street demonstrations against increased Egyptian control and the army was brought out to guard key buildings in Damascus.

On 20 September 1961 Sarraj and Amer went to Cairo for a crisis meeting with Nasser. Sarraj was expected to continue in his duties, but on 26 September he submitted his resignation from all posts. Nasser ordered Amer to return to Damascus immediately.

During this tumultuous time amongst the UAR leadership, the coup plotters were able to plan and launch their coup unnoticed.

== The coup ==
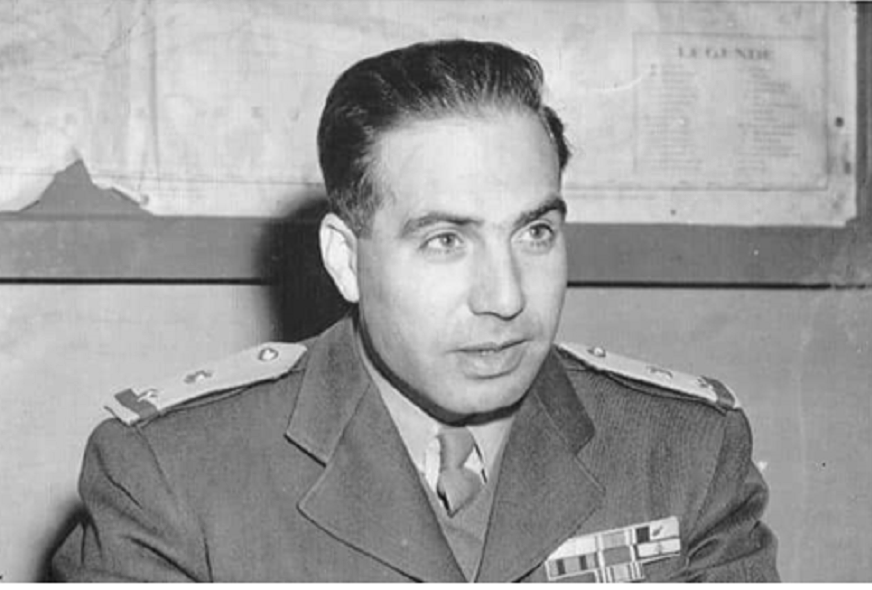
Abdul Karim al-Nahlawi, leader of separatists

At 4 am on 28 September an armoured column under the command of Lt-Colonel Abd al-Karim al-Nahlawi, the chief of Amer's bureau in Syria, and Desert Guard units under the command of Lt-Colonel Haydar al-Kuzbari entered Damascus, and met with the troops of the Damascus garrison and air force. Army HQ, the radio station and airport were seized, checkpoints established and tanks patrolled the streets. The Syrian Army's commanding officers and Amer were arrested. Sarraj was placed under house arrest. Just before his arrest at 4 am, Amer had time to order Egyptian Major General Anwar al-Qadi to move a field artillery brigade from its base 40 km away from Damascus to the city and to suppress the uprising. While the Egyptian officers, ignoring Syrian complaints, dutifully obeyed the order, en route to Damascus these troops were met by their Syrian commanding officer who ordered them back to the base and arrested all the Egyptian officers.

At 7:25 am Damascus radio broadcast communique #1 of the Supreme Arab Revolutionary Command of the Armed Forces (SARCAF) in which they announced that "the army has taken steps to remove corruption and tyranny and to restore the legitimate rights of the people". Communique #2 was more political and listed complaints against "the oppressive, corrupt clique" that had discredited the union between the Arab peoples. Socialist laws that had been introduced in July and plans to purge Syrian officers were also criticized. Communique #3 announced that SARCAF was in full control and asked that all Egyptians be treatred with care. Communique #4 announced the closure of all airports and harbors.

While SARCAF at this time did not announce the break-up of the UAR or secession from it, most Syrians had had enough of Egyptian rule, and despite the never-ending professions towards the goal of Arab unity, they were happy to regain their traditional freedoms.

At 9:07 am Nasser took the unusual step of responding to the rebellion via live radio broadcast. He announced that he would not dissolve the UAR (this was to be done by Anwar Sadat in September 1971), that the rebellion in Damascus was small scale and that he had given orders to the Syrian army to suppress it.

Meanwhile, Amer, along with other arrested Syrian army commanders and ministers spent the day negotiating with the rebels. Amer was certain that the UAR could be saved by meeting the rebel demands for greater local autonomy, softening the July laws and through agrarian reform. It is still unclear if Amer was sincere during these negotiations or was simply playing for time and awaiting Egyptian troops. Amer was allowed to get in touch with Nasser via shortwave radio and to get his approval for this agreement. On this conciliatory note, SARCAF communique #9 was broadcast at 1:26 pm in which it was announced that SARCAF wanted to preserve Arab unity and that Amer had "made the necessary decisions to safeguard the unity of the armed forces of the United Arab Republic. The army matters had been restored to their normal course." Radio Damascus once again identified itself as the "radio station of the UAR in Damascus".

While for a few hours it seemed that the UAR was saved, both sides were far from agreement. By early afternoon the rebels had received support from nearly all the Syrian army units and felt certain of victory. Nasser refused to negotiate with the rebels or to change his policies in Syria. At 5:20 pm, Amer and a group of Egyptian officers and loyalists were put on a plane to Cairo; this was announced in communique #12 at 5:45 pm.

At 6:55 pm Nasser went on the radio once again. He refused to negotiate and called on the armed forces to do their duty by crushing the rebels. In fact, at around 9:30 am that morning, Nasser had ordered some Egyptian troops to Syria in an effort to suppress the rebellion. As Egypt and Syria shared no land border, airborne paratroopers and some seaborne troops were ordered to leave for Latakia and Aleppo, where army bases were still loyal to Nasser. However, a short time before the Egyptian forces reached these bases they were taken over by rebel troops. The fewer than 200 Egyptian paratroopers who landed in Latakia were surrounded by the rebel troops and later returned to Egypt. Nasser called off the whole operation. On 2 November 870 Egyptian officers and soldiers were sent home while 960 Syrians returned home peacefully from Egypt.

Later in the evening of 28 September, rebel radio announcements started attacking Nasser personally, calling him a tyrant. A curfew was imposed on Damascus from 7 pm until 5:30 am. If during the day it was unclear if rebels want greater freedom for Syria within UAR or restoration of total independence, when Radio Damascus ended its last broadcast for that day after midnight with the Syrian national anthem it was clear that they had chosen independence.

== Secessionist government period (29 September 1961 – 8 March 1963) ==
At 7:30 am on 29 September, Radio Damascus announced that SARCAF has entrusted Maamun al-Kuzbari (a relative of one of the coup organizers) to form a new government which consisted of the old National Party and People's Party politicians. It was government of the traditional Syrian elites, but it promised to maintain some of Nasser's progressive and socialist policies. On the same day Jordan and Turkey recognized the new regime. During that day, Major-General Abdel Karim Zahreddine, a Druze, who was not involved in the planning of the coup, was appointed the army's commander-in-chief. He was a compromise figure and survived in the post until the 8 March 1963, coup. The restored republic kept the flag and anthem of the old Syrian Republic but changed its name to the Syrian Arab Republic (to demonstrate its commitment to the Arab nationalist cause).

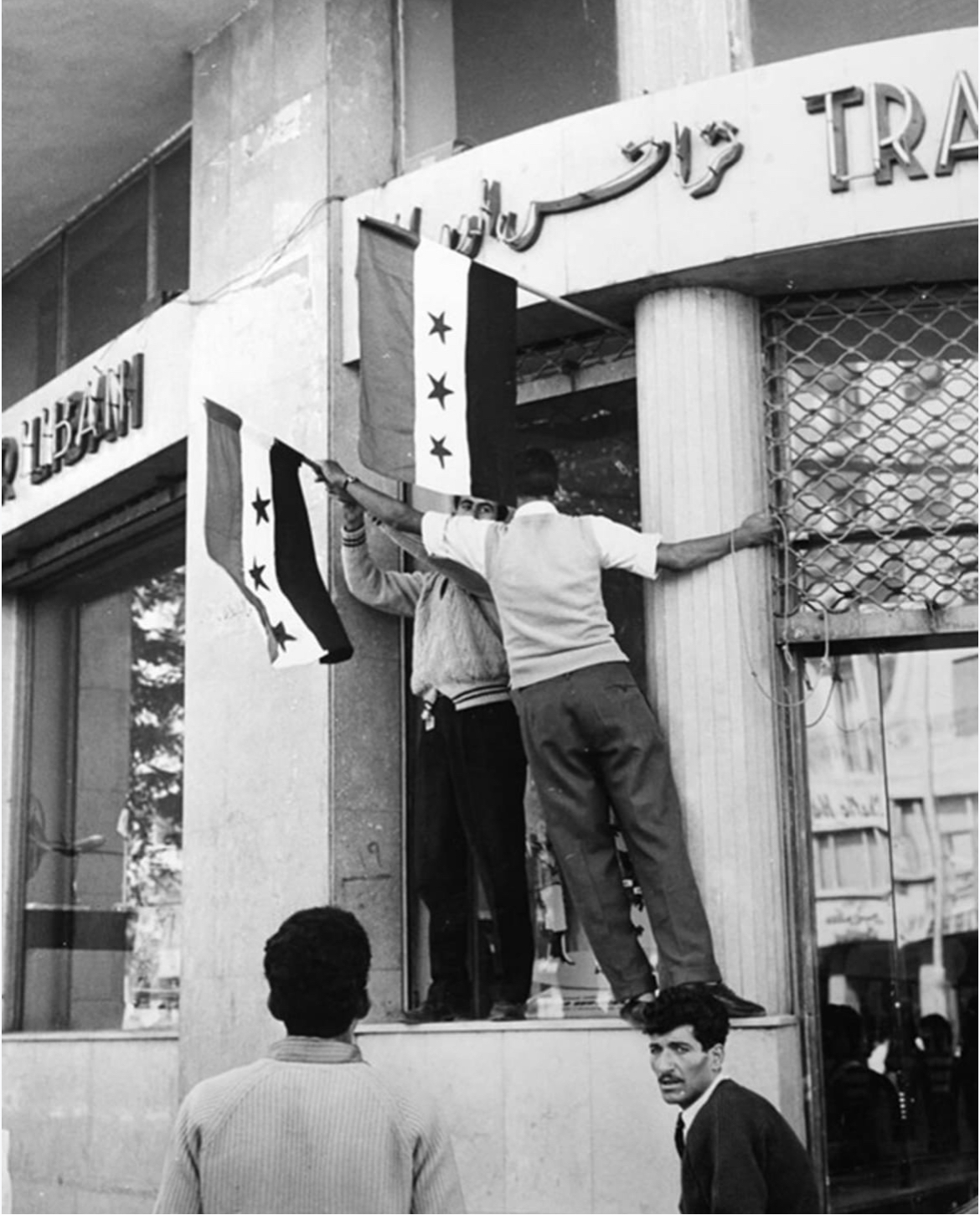
Raising of Syrian flag instead of UARs

In a speech on 5 October Nasser recognized the fact of Syrian secession and said that he would not block Syria's renewed membership in the UN and League of Arab States which Syria re-joined on 29 October. However, this did not mean that Nasser was going to be friendly towards the new regime. The Egyptian-Syrian propaganda wars started in October with Egypt calling the Syrian politicians “capitalists, reactionaries and feudalists”. Instead of talking about the dictatorial nature of the UAR police state, the Syrians constantly had to respond by stating that they were not reactionaries, western agents and traitors against Arab unity.

After SARCAF appointed Zahreddine, the new communiques were issued under his name. A new National Security Council was established which included the Army commanders, the President and five key ministers who supervised the government. This system was the source for the instability of the secessionist regime. While the parliament and government were composed of largely traditional, right of centre politicians, the military wanted to retain and to implement many of the UAR era socialist reforms and gains aimed at improving conditions for the poor and creation of a state controlled economy. The military were not democrats, but rather wanted to implement their local version of UAR-style one party military rule.

Abd al-Karim al-Nahlawi established a National Security Council, which served as a tool for continued army control over the civilian government. UAR era restrictions on political and individual freedoms were retained. Political parties were still banned and control over the media was retained. Those who were purged from their posts under the UAR regime were not reinstated. The traditional infighting and instability resumed. This was aided by the fact that the main coup leaders had different political leanings and also business interests (through their extended families). Al-Kuzbari was arrested already in November 1961 and al-Husseini in January 1962.

While the traditional parties fully supported the restored Syria, the Ba’ath party was split. Akram al-Hawrani and his socialists were against the UAR, while both founders Michel Aflaq and Salah ad-Din al-Bitar sent confusing signals. Aflaq refused to support secession, while al-Bitar initially had supported it, but withdrew his support under pressure from the party. Many party members in the provinces had kept the party alive during the UAR period and were against Aflaq, who had proclaimed the dissolution of the Ba’ath party without any consultation with party members. This period of confusion increased the determination of the Ba’ath Military Committee to achieve its goals.

Prior to ratification of the newly drafted Constitution, the Constitution of 1950 was in force. On 17 October Syria abolished the July laws that had nationalized large sectors of the economy.

After the December elections, Peoples Party leaders Maarouf al-Dawalibi and Nazim al-Kudsi became prime minister and president, respectively. Maamun al-Kuzbari was elected Speaker of the Parliament.

During the first months after the coup, the government succeeded in reducing the number of coup supporters in the leading army positions and at the same reduced UAR socialist laws and regulations. Instead of maintaining strong relations with Egypt's ally, the USSR, better relations were established with West Germany and Iraq. On 16 March 1962 President Nazim al-Kudsi met with Iraq's prime minister Abd al-Karim Qasim.

During the spring of 1962 the pressure grew in parliament for the restoration of full democratic freedoms. Parliament requested al-Dawalibi's resignation, restoration of all liberties and establishment of National Unity Government. Al-Dawalibi resigned on 27 March.

Between 28 March and 2 April 1962 Syria was racked by coups and counter coups. The first attempt was made by Abd al-Karim al-Nahawi, whose forces now included Ba’athists and Nasserites. He wanted to regain his lost influence in the army and government. Al-Nahlawi's forces arrested government members and dissolved the parliament after which President al-Qudsi resigned in protest. On 30 March general Zahreddine and leading army officers from the Damascus region announced that this coup was a continuation of the 28 September coup and would return the country to its original goals.

Meanwhile, on 31 March Nasserites and Ba’athists led by Jassem Alwan rose in revolt. While their goals were different, they were united in their opposition to al-Nahlawi's coup in Damascus. Alwan's forces and Ba’athists from the Military Committee rebelled in Aleppo, Homs and Deir ez-Zor. They called for the restoration of the UAR and for Egypt to send supporting troops.

On 1 April 1962, army chief Zahreddine held talks in Homs between all the army factions, during which a secret compromise was reached:

1. Both al-Nahlawi, Alwan and his leading supporters were exiled.
2. President al-Qudsi and the civilian government were reinstated.
3. New elections and a referendum about the union with Egypt would be organized in the near future.
4. Army ranks would be reorganized so that Nasserites obtained their share of posts.
5. The UAR's land reform and nationalization policies would be reintroduced.
6. It would be ensured that Jaseem's Aleppo garrison adhered to these agreements.

Syria's army had fractured along political, regional and religious lines, but it was unified in its wish to retain control over the government, prevent a return to a full democracy and continue on a more socialist course of development.

On 3rd April, a group of mutinous officers was exiled to Switzerland. On 4th April, Zahreddine made new appointments in the ranks. On 13 April President al-Qudsi resumed his duties. On 16 April a new government of technocrats, led by Dr. Bashir al-Azma was sworn in. Zahreddine was the new Defence minister. This government renationalized large enterprises including banks and restarted land reform.

Meanwhile, Nasserites and Ba’athists, with Egyptian support, planned another coup for the restoration of UAR, which was to take place on 28 July 1962, but was discovered and suppressed by the government. Syria demanded that the Arab League look into the matter and during a meeting publicly accused Egypt of wanting to annex Syria. The Egyptian delegation left the meeting and suspended Syrian participation in the Arab League for a year.

On 17 September a new National Unity Government, led by Khalid al-Azm, was sworn in and the parliament dissolved. The new government began to implement socialist policies and restore full democratic liberties. The state of emergency was lifted on 22 December 1962. Benefiting from the new liberties, Abd al-Karim al-Hahlawi returned to Syria and demanded reinstatement in the army. The machinations and conspiracies in the army continued and eventually led to the coup of 8 March 1963, organized by junior officers from the Ba’athist Military Committee.
