= Abdul Karim al-Nahlawi =

Lieutenant colonel Abdul Karim al-Nahlawi
- عبد الكريم النحلاوي
- Born: 1926 (age 99–100); Damascus, French Syria
- Military career
- Allegiance: First Syrian Republic (1948–1950); Second Syrian Republic (1950–1958; 1961–63); United Arab Republic (1958–1961)
- Branch: Syrian Army
- Service years: 1948–1963
- Rank: Lieutenant colonel

Abdul Karim al-Nahlawi (Arabic: عبد الكريم النحلاوي; born 1926) is a Syrian former military officer. He is known for being the leader of the 1961 Syrian coup d'état against Gamal Abdel Nasser which ended the union of Syria and Egypt as the United Arab Republic (UAR). He insisted that the coup was intended to correct the path of the unity, not to end it.

On 28 March 1962, Al-Nahlawi attempted to seize power directly for himself in another coup against his former political allies Nazim al-Qudsi, Maarouf al-Dawalibi and Khalid al-Azm. However, the coup failed and after this failed coup, he briefly held diplomatic posts in Indonesia, Pakistan, Morocco and Turkey, but after the 8th March 1963 Baathist coup d'état, he was expelled from the army and went into exile in Saudi Arabia.

Al-Nahlawi was a lieutenant colonel in the UAR's armed forces when he headed a coalition of moderate officers from Damascus in a coup on behalf of Maamun al-Kuzbari, (Note: Cited by name by Gamal Abdel Nasser in the Ministerial Council of 19 October 1961, as deceitfully praising the union and socialist policies in public whilst conspiring the coup, which was the case of several of Syria's class of hereditary notables and financial rentiers who all pretended to be Nasserists with zeal.) and in collaboration with Haydar al-Kuzbari (who was married to Al-Nahlawi's sister and is the cousin of Maamun al-Kuzbari), and Muwafak 'Asasa (موفق عصاصة). The coup was against Nasser and locally his deputy Abdel Hakim Amer, who was the Egyptian viceroy in Syria. The Syrian officers were to some degree operating at the behest of the Syrian middle and upper class who opposed Nasser's socialist policies and in particular land reform.

In his later life, he relocated to the United States. In 2021, he gave an interview to Al Araby about the current situation in Syria, and provided insight into the 1961 coup.
