= Armed Forces of the United Arab Republic =

Military forces of the United Arab Republic (1958–1961)

- القوات المسلحة للجمهورية العربية المتحدة
- Army flag

- Naval ensign Air force ensign
- Founded: 22 February 1958
- Disbanded: 5 October 1961
- Service branches: Army; Air force Navy

Leadership
- President: Gamal Abdel Nasser
- Commander-in-Chief: Abdel Hakim Amer
- Chief of Staff: Mohamed Ibrahim Selim
- Commander of the First Army: Jamal al-Faisal

Personnel
- Active personnel: 1,500,000
- Reserve personnel: 1,500,000

Industry
- Foreign suppliers: Soviet Union; East Germany; Cuba; Yugoslavia

Related articles
- History: Air engagement on 4 November 1959; Rotem Crisis; Fedayeen operations

The Armed Forces of the United Arab Republic (Arabic: القوات المسلحة للجمهورية العربية المتحدة) was the official designation of the military of the United Arab Republic, a union made up of the territories of Egypt and Syria. After the union was announced on 22 February 1958, the Syrian Army was called the First Army, and the Egyptian Army was named the Second Army. It was dissolved after Syria withdrew from the union after a coup d'état took place on 28 September 1961. However, Egypt under Gamal Abdel Nasser continued using the designation.

== Syria ==
The First Field Army was a designation used during the period of the United Arab Republic. It was based in Syria. During the period of the United Arab Republic, army forces based in Syria was designated the First, and the other army in Egypt the Second (and possibly Third). By 1973 any use of the 'First' designation in Syria had ended, but this did not stop erroneous Western press reporting that forces of the Central Military Region around Cairo were designated the First Army.
