= 1962 Syrian coup attempt =

Coup d'etat attempt by Karim Nahlawi

1962 Syrian coup d'état attempt
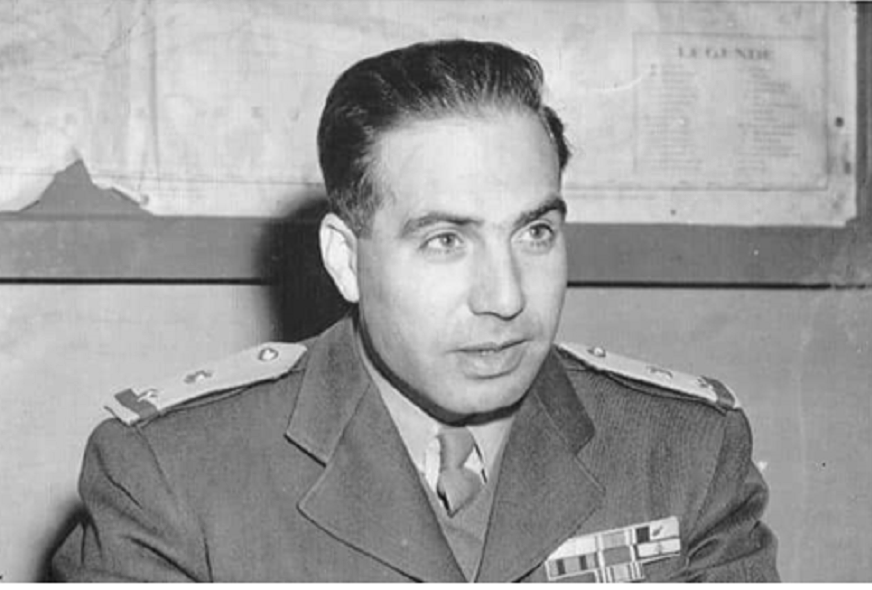
- Abdul Karim al-Nahlawi, leader of the coup
| Date | 28 March – 2 April 1962 |
| Location | Syrian Arab Republic, Damascus |
| Result | Short-lived military junta in Damascus was formed which paid lip service to the slogans of union and socialism. The coup ultimately failed in the end. |

Belligerents
| Military; Supported by: United Arab Republic | Politicians |

Commanders and leaders
| Abd al-Karim al-Nahlawi; Abd al-Karim Zahr al-Din | Nazim al-Qudsi; Maarouf al-Dawalibi |

The 1962 Syrian coup d'état attempt, also called the March 28 Action, was a coup d'état resulting in a short-lived military junta based in Damascus which ruled over the Syria which also paid lip service to the slogans of union and socialism. It was carried out by Lt. Col. Abd al-Karim al-Nahlawi on 28 March 1962. The same officer, Nahlawi, was in charge of the coup that brought about the disintegration of the United Arab Republic, a federation of Egypt and Syria, exactly six months earlier. Al-Nahlawi issued an order on 28 March for the president to be detained and taken to the General Staff building. He was imprisoned at Mezze Military Hospital. After the ones that were given on 28 September 1961, the radio started airing military announcements.

The escalation of tensions between Nahlawi and Nazim al-Qudsi, the Republic's then-President, who assumed office in December, was one of the coup's primary drivers. The socialist policies Abdel Nasser approved two months prior to the secession are among them, as the military just sought to amend them but the political class preferred to entirely revoke them. Senior officers believed that the Syrians, like a large portion of the military, were still pro-Nasser. Marouf Al-Dawalibi was in disagreement with the officers who backed the socialist decisions, hence Al-Nahlawi requested that Al-Qudsi fire him. He also asked for the removal of Said al-Ghazzi, Maamun al-Kuzbari, and Khalid al-Azm from the political scene, the lifting of some MPs' immunity, and a reduction in the Constituent Assembly's tenure from 18 months to just six. All of these demands were rejected by Al-Qudsi.

Al-Nahlawi anticipated being honored and promoted to a senior position because he thought the politicians should give him credit for what they were able to enjoy in the separatist republic. Al-Nahlawi asserted that the coup was a continuation of the coup from 1961 and that its goals were reform and a change of direction. On 16 April, a technocratic government was established following the failed attempt due to resistance from some military members. Abd al-Karim Zahr al-Din took over as Minister of Defense.

== Background ==
After barely 3 years and 7 months, the state of unification between Egypt and Syria came to an end on 29 September 1961.

Abd al-Karim al-Nahlawi and his military colleagues, clashing with civilian politicians, sought to modify the socialist policies introduced by Abdel Nasser during the July 1961 union, which nationalized banks, factories, and companies. The traditional political establishment, including President Nazim al-Kudsi and Prime Minister Maarouf al-Dawalibi, favored their outright repeal. Both Kudsi and Dawalibi came from merchant families whose economic interests were damaged by these socialist measures. The military justified their position by arguing that the Syrian populace remained Nasserist, and they further demanded a change in the premiership.
