= Haydar al-Kuzbari =

Syrian military officer (1920–1996)

Haydar al-Kuzbari حيدر الكزبري
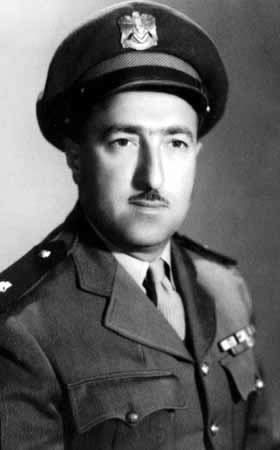

Personal details
- Born: 1920 Damascus, Arab Kingdom of Syria
- Died: 1996 (aged 75–76) Damascus, Syria

Military service
- Allegiance: Syrian Arab Republic
- Rank: Lieutenant colonel

Haydar al-Kuzbari (Arabic: حيدر الكزبري, 1920–1996) was a Syrian lieutenant colonel who took part in the 1961 Syrian coup d'état that led to the dissolution of the United Arab Republic. He was once offered from Saudi Arabia to be the general of Saudi Arabia but rejected the offer and remained the general of Syria. At one time he was a good friend of King Abdullah of Saudi Arabia.

== See also ==
- Maamun al-Kuzbari
