= Abdul Hamid al-Sarraj =

Syrian Army officer and politician (1925–2013)

Abdul Hamid Sarraj
- عبد الحميد السراج
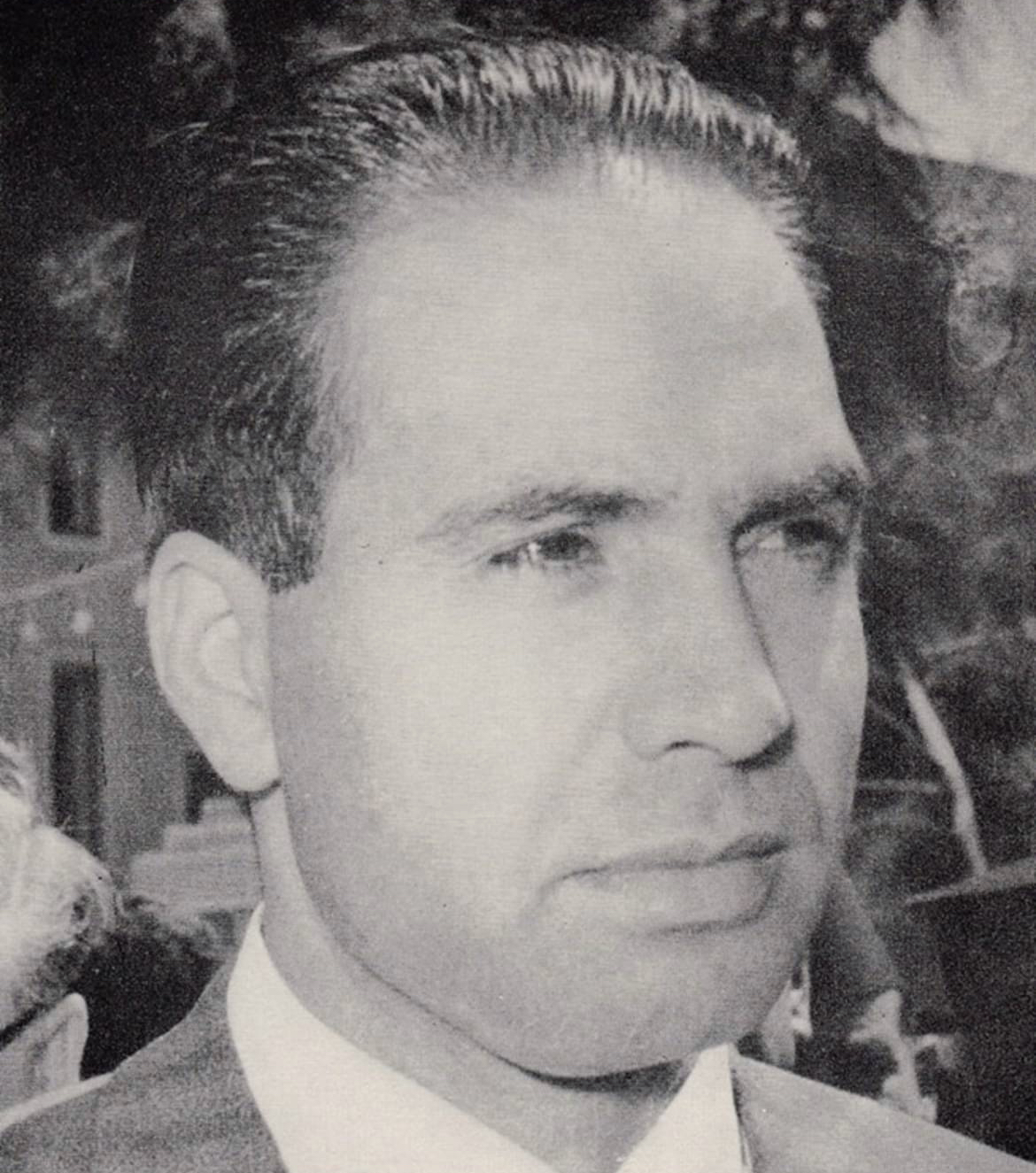
- Sarraj between 1958 and 1961

Chairman of the Executive Council of the Northern Region of the United Arab Republic
- In office 20 September 1960 – 16 August 1961
- Prime Minister: Gamal Abdel Nasser
- Preceded by: Nur al-Din Kahala
- Succeeded by: Maamun al-Kuzbari

Personal details
- Born: September 1925 Hama, State of Syria
- Died: 23 September 2013 (aged 87–88) Cairo, Egypt
- Party: National Union
- Spouse: Malak Zulfu
- Occupation: Military Intelligence (1954-1958); Minister of Interior (1958–1961); Vice-president (1961)

Military service
- Allegiance: First Syrian Republic (1946–1950); Second Syrian Republic (1950–1958); United Arab Republic (1958–1961)
- Branch/service: Syrian Army
- Years of service: 1946–1961
- Rank: Colonel
- Battles/wars: First Arab-Israeli War

Abdul Hamid Sarraj (Arabic: عبد الحميد السراج, September 1925 – 23 September 2013) was a Syrian military officer and politician. When the union between Egypt and Syria — the United Arab Republic (UAR) — was declared in 1958, Sarraj, a staunch Arab nationalist and supporter of Egyptian president Gamal Abdel Nasser, played a key role in the leadership of the Syrian region of the UAR. Due to the repression by the UAR of the Syrian communists he was nicknamed Sultan Abdul Hamid referring to the Ottoman sultan Abdul Hamid II. He is alleged to have founded the initial absolute security regime in Syria, constructing the framework of a police state and introducing systematized torture during his tenure as head of the Military Intelligence (Deuxième Bureau) in 1955, which held the authority to interfere in all facets of political and civil life.

== Early life ==
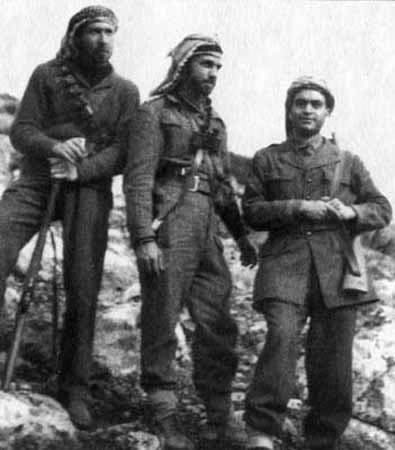
Sarraj (centre) with army comrades, Mohammad Attura (left) and Abdul Salam al-Ujyali (right), at the battlefront in Palestine, 1948

Sarraj was born in Hama in September 1925 to a conservative Sunni Muslim family of Kurdish descent. His political outlook developed within Arab nationalist circles. According to historian David Roberts, Sarraj was a member of the well-known 1946 class at the Homs Military Academy, where he came under the influence of Jamal Faysal, an instructor who later became a leading Nasserist. He was among officers who shared Arab nationalist, progressive and liberationist ideas.He was one of the first officers in the army after Syria's independence from France. Sarraj participated in the 1948 Arab-Israeli War as a volunteer in the Arab Liberation Army. He led a detachment of six armoured vehicles to surround Safad.

== Political career ==
He played a role in the 1949 coup that removed Husni al-Zaim from power and took over the personnel department of Adib Shishakli's government in 1952. When Shishakli was ousted, Sarraj was temporarily sent to Paris as an assistant military attaché. In February 1954, he was appointed head of the Syrian military intelligence. From this position, he was able to play a crucial role in preventing conspiracies against the government. Sarraj did not join any political parties, but cooperated with the ones in power, in particular against the Ba'ath. In September 1957, he helped negotiate the landing of 4,000 Egyptian troops in Latakia as part of defence pact made between the two countries.

=== Role in the United Arab Republic ===
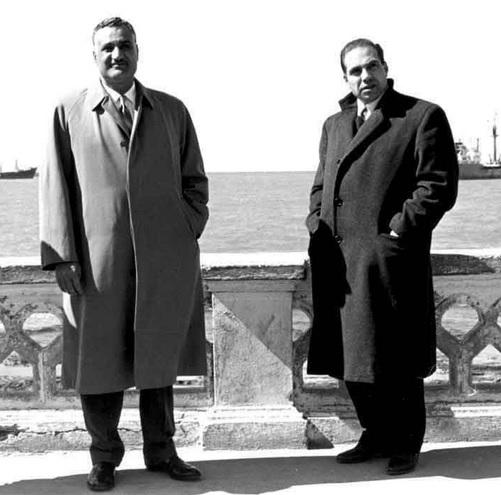
Sarraj (right) with UAR President Gamal Abdel Nasser in Latakia, March 1959

When the union between Egypt and Syria was declared, Sarraj, a staunch supporter of Egyptian president Gamal Abdel Nasser, was handed a key position in the cabinet as Minister of the Interior. His position was elevated when the Syrian gendarmerie, the desert patrol, and the Department of General Security were transferred to his jurisdiction on 13 March 1958. Following the resignation of Ba'ath party ministers from the UAR government, Sarraj was given the additional appointments of Minister of Social Affairs and Minister of Awqaf on 1 January 1960.

On 20 September 1960, he was appointed President of the Syrian Executive Council (SEC). Sarraj, at age 35, became the most powerful Syrian official in the UAR. Besides being interior minister and president of the SEC, he also headed the Syrian branch of Nasser's National Union party and was chairman of the Syrian economic foundation established in March 1960. A British official visiting Damascus described him as the "Viceroy of Syria". However, his use of police methods, which were seen as ruthless, and his considerable power made him unpopular in Syria. Nonetheless, he was known to be an impeccable Arab nationalist who could "get things done." Pressure was exerted on Nasser to remove Sarraj from power, but he refused, feeling that there was no one more fit to run Syria on his behalf. Eventually, in August 1961, Nasser decided to appoint him vice-president, relocating him to Cairo and thus heralding his downfall as Syria's de facto leader.

On 18 September, when Nasser merged the two branches of the National Union, therefore depriving Sarraj of his position as Secretary-General of the Syrian branch and when Egyptian vice-president Abdel Hakim Amer dismissed one of his closest associates, Sarraj submitted his resignation. The UAR's state minister, Abdel Qadir Hatem, was sent to mediate between Sarraj and Amer, but failed and the former began mobilising his forces on 19–20 September. Realising an operation against Nasser was unlikely to succeed, he agreed to meet Nasser and Amer in Cairo. Although Nasser condemned Sarraj for his ambition to be sole ruler of Syria, he replaced Amer as Minister of Syrian Affairs with Mahmoud Riad. Resuming his post as Syria's vice president, Sarraj also headed a ministerial committee for UAR administrative reform. However, he suddenly submitted a second resignation on 26 September and Nasser accepted it, sending Amer to replace him.

== Later life and death ==
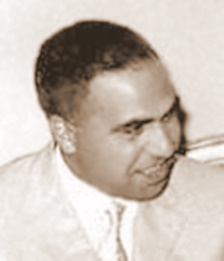
Sarraj in 1960

On 28 September 1961, a coup by disaffected officers occurred in Syria, dissolving the UAR. Sarraj was arrested and jailed in the Mezzeh Prison in Damascus. He escaped from the prison and left Syria for Beirut, Lebanon. In 1964 the Syrian Socialist Nationalist Party (SSNP) attempted to assassinate Sarraj, prompting his flight to Egypt where he made amends with Nasser. Sarraj lived in Cairo as a private citizen, serving as a director of social security. In 2004 he was reportedly still living in Cairo. However, former defence minister Mustafa Tlass had been lobbying the Syrian government for the return of Sarraj to Syria. According to al-Ahram Weekly, he was expected to return in late 2005.

However, Sarraj did not return to Syria and died in Cairo on 23 September 2013. He had requested to be buried in Syria, but due to the unstable security condition of the country due to the civil war, he was buried in Cairo.
