= Bashir al-Azma =

Syrian doctor and politician

- بشير العظَمة
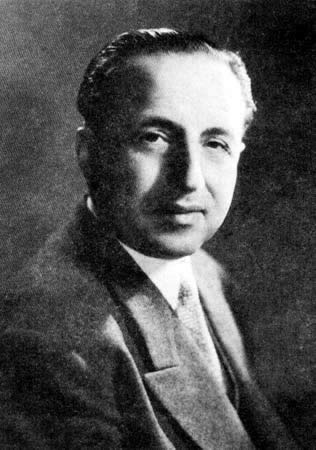

Prime Minister of Syria
- In office April 16, 1962 – September 14, 1962
- President: Nazim al-Kudsi
- Deputy: Rashad Barmada
- Preceded by: Maaruf al-Dawalibi
- Succeeded by: Khalid al-Azm

Personal details
- Born: 1910 Damascus, Syria vilayet, Ottoman Empire
- Died: 1992 (aged 82) Damascus, Syrian Arab Republic

Bashir al-Azma (1910–1992) (Arabic: بشير العظَمة), was a Syrian doctor and politician. He served as Prime Minister of Syria from 16 April to 14 September 1962.

He was born in and raised in the capital Damascus. He obtained his undergraduate degree in Medicine from Damascus University and his graduate in Paris. He became the Minister of Health under the United Arab Republic (UAR) but resigned due to a conflict with Gamal Abdel Nasser. Later, he became the Prime Minister of Syria after the dissolution of the UAR.

Bashir al-Azma was one of several Syrian Prime Ministers who intended to keep Syria out of the east–west conflict and demonstrate its passive approach to it. On 22 April 1962, al-Azma declared on Radio Damascus that Syria's foreign policy continued to be based on "the principles of positive neutrality and non-alignment with military blocs, non-participation in the Cold War, and respect for the principles of the UN Charter."

== Personal life ==
Bashir al-Azma was from the distinguished al-Azma family, who were of Turkish origin.
