= Izzat al-Nuss =

Syrian politician

- عزت النص
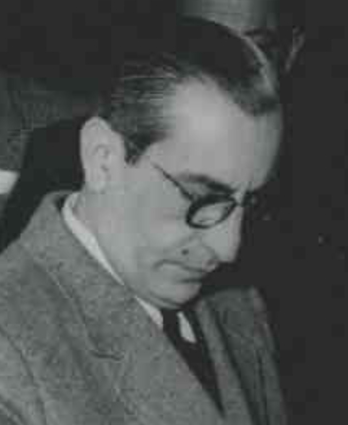
- Al-Nuss in 1961

Prime Minister of Syria
- In office 20 November 1961 – 14 December 1961
- Preceded by: Maamun al-Kuzbari
- Succeeded by: Maarouf al-Dawalibi

Personal details
- Born: 1912 Damascus, Syria
- Died: 1976 (aged 63–64) Damascus, Syria
- Party: Independent
- Spouse: Fatimah Keilani
- Children: 2 (Rafif and Rana)

Izzat al-Nuss (Arabic: عزت النص; 1912–1976) was a Syrian politician who was the prime minister of Syria from 20 November to 14 December 1961.

== Biography ==
Born in Damascus, al-Nuss studied literature at the University of Paris, then returned to Syria and held several positions in the Ministry of Education. He later served as a secretary to President Hashim al-Atassi from March to September 1955, then worked in the University of Damascus until 1961, when Maamun al-Kuzbari appointed him as minister of education and later in charge of the provisional government during the parliamentary elections. He was also the interim minister of defense and minister of foreign affairs and expatriates until 22 December 1961.

He died in 1976 in Damascus, at age 64.
