= Second Syrian Republic =

Syrian state from 1950 to 1963

Syrian Republic (1950–1958) الجمهورية السورية (Arabic) al-Jumhūrīyah as-Sūriyyah Northern Region (Syria) (1958–1961) الإقليم الشمالي (Arabic) Syrian Arab Republic (1961–1963) الجمهورية العربية السورية (Arabic) al-Jumhūrīyah al-ʿArabiyyah as-Sūriyyah
- 1950–1963; 1958–1961: United Arab Republic
- Flag Emblem (1950–1958)
- Anthem: "Ḥumāt ad-Diyār" (English: "Guardians of the Homeland")
- Status: Component of the United Arab Republic (1958–61)
- Capital: Damascus; 33°30′N 36°18′E
- Largest city: Aleppo; 36°20′N 37°16′E
- Official languages: Arabic
- Recognised languages: Syriac; Kurdish; Armenian
- Religion: Islam (all branches incl. Alawite); Christianity; Judaism; Druzism; Yazidism
- Demonym: Syrian
- Government: Military dictatorship (1950–1951): Under one-party rule (1951–1954); under the SARCAF Military Junta (1961); Unitary parliamentary republic (1954–1958, 1961–1963) Unitary Nasserist one-party state (1958–1961)
- President
  - 1950–1951: Hashim al-Atassi (first)
  - 1961–1963: Nazim al-Kudsi (last)
- Vice President
  - 1952–1954: Maamun al-Kuzbari
- Prime Minister
  - 1950: Nazim al-Kudsi (first)
  - 1962–1963: Khalid al-Azm (last)
- Legislature: Chamber of Deputies (1953–1954); Parliamentary Assembly (1961–1963)
- Historical era: Cold War
  - Independence of First Syrian Republic: 17 April 1946
  - New constitution adopted: 5 September 1950
  - 1958 Syrian United Arab Republic referendum: 21 February 1958
  - Merger with Egypt: 22 February 1958
  - 1961 Syrian coup d'état; Republic restored: 28 September 1961
  - 1962 Syrian coup attempt: 28 March 1962 – 2 April 1962
  - Ba'athist seizure of power: 8 March 1963

Area
  - Total: 189,880 km^{2} (73,310 sq mi)
- Currency: Syrian pound
- ISO 3166 code: SY
Preceded by	Succeeded by
1950; First Syrian Republic; 1961; United Arab Republic	1958; United Arab Republic; 1963; Ba'athist Syria

The Second Syrian Republic, (Note: Arabic: الجمهورية السورية الثانية) officially the Syrian Republic (Note: Arabic: الجمهورية السورية al-Jumhūriyah as-Sūriyyah) from 1950 to 1958 and the Syrian Arab Republic (Note: Arabic: الجمهورية العربية السورية al-Jumhūriyah al-ʿArabiyyah as-Sūriyyah) from 1961 to 1963, succeeded the First Syrian Republic, which had become de facto independent from the French Mandate in April 1946. The Second Republic was established under the Syrian Constitution of 1950, which was suspended from 1950 to 1954 during Adib Shishakli's rule and later became inoperative when Syria joined with the Republic of Egypt to form the United Arab Republic in 1958. The Second Republic was restored when Syria withdrew from the union in 1961. In 1963, the Syrian Ba'athist Party came to power in a bloodless military coup, which laid the foundations for the political structure of Ba'athist Syria and ended the era of democratic experimentation in post-colonial Syria.

The green, white, black, and red flag was adopted by President Nazim al-Qudsi on 28 September 1961 to completely disassociate Syria from the United Arab Republic. It was later adopted by the Syrian opposition during the Syrian civil war. Following the fall of the Assad regime, the Hay'at Tahrir al-Sham-dominated Syrian caretaker government adopted and used the revolution flag, a modified version of the independence flag. The revolution flag became the official flag of Syria once again on 13 March 2025, when the Constitutional Declaration designated it as the national flag.

== Background ==
=== Mandatory Syrian Republic (1930–1946) ===
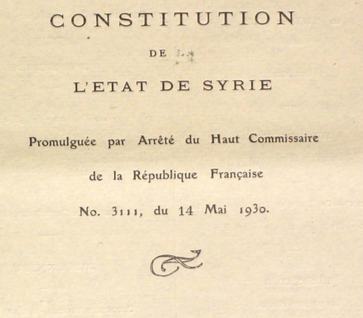
Constitution of the Syrian Republic, 14 May 1930

The project of a new constitution was discussed by a Constituent Assembly elected in April 1928, but as the pro-independence National Bloc had won a majority and insisted on the insertion of several articles "that did not preserve the prerogatives of the mandatary power", the Assembly was dissolved on 9 August 1928. On 14 May 1930, the State of Syria was declared the Republic of Syria and a new Syrian constitution was promulgated by the French High Commissioner, at the same time as the Lebanese Constitution, the Règlement du Sandjak d'Alexandrette, the Statute of the Alawi Government, the Statute of the Jabal Druze State. A new flag was also mentioned in this constitution:

The Syrian flag shall be composed as follows, the length shall be double the height. It shall contain three bands of equal dimensions, the upper band being green, the middle band white, and the lower band black. The white portion shall bear three red stars in line, having five points each.

During December 1931 and January 1932, the first elections under the new constitution were held, under an electoral law providing for "the representation of religious minorities" as imposed by article 37 of the constitution. The National Bloc was in the minority in the new Chamber of deputies with only 16 deputies out of 70, due to intensive vote-rigging by the French authorities. Among the deputies were also three members of the Syrian Kurdish nationalist Xoybûn (Khoyboun) party, Khalil bey Ibn Ibrahim Pacha (Al-Jazira province), Mustafa bey Ibn Shahin (Jarabulus) and Hassan Aouni (Kurd Dagh). There were later in the year, from 30 March to 6 April, "complementary elections".

In 1933, France attempted to impose a treaty of independence heavily prejudiced in favor of France. It promised gradual independence but kept the Syrian Mountains under French control. The Syrian head of state at the time was a French puppet, Muhammad 'Ali Bay al-'Abid. Fierce opposition to this treaty was spearheaded by senior nationalist and parliamentarian Hashim al-Atassi, who called for a sixty-day strike in protest. Atassi's political coalition, the National Bloc, mobilized massive popular support for his call. Riots and demonstrations raged, and the economy came to a standstill.

After negotiations in March with Damien de Martel, the French High Commissioner in Syria, Hashim al-Atassi went to Paris heading a senior Bloc delegation. The new Popular Front-led French government, formed in June 1936 after the April–May elections, had agreed to recognize the National Bloc as the sole legitimate representatives of the Syrian people and invited al-Atassi to independence negotiations. The resulting treaty called for immediate recognition of Syrian independence as a sovereign republic, with full emancipation granted gradually over a 25-year period.

In 1936, the Franco-Syrian Treaty of Independence was signed, a treaty that would not be ratified by the French legislature. However, the treaty allowed Jabal Druze, the Alawite region (now called Latakia), and Alexandretta to be incorporated into the Syrian republic within the following two years. Greater Lebanon (now the Lebanese Republic) was the only state that did not join the Syrian Republic. Hashim al-Atassi, who was Prime Minister during King Faisal's brief reign (1918–1920), was the first president to be elected under a new constitution adopted after the independence treaty.

The treaty guaranteed incorporation of previously autonomous Druze and Alawite regions into Greater Syria, but not Lebanon, with which France signed a similar treaty in November. The treaty also promised curtailment of French intervention in Syrian domestic affairs as well as a reduction of French troops, personnel and military bases in Syria. In return, Syria pledged to support France in times of war, including the use of its air space, and to allow France to maintain two military bases on Syrian territory. Other political, economic and cultural provisions were included.

Atassi returned to Syria in triumph on 27 September 1936 and was elected President of the Republic in November.

In September 1938, France again separated the Syrian Sanjak of Alexandretta and transformed it into the State of Hatay. The State of Hatay joined Turkey in the following year by an election which is made by the people in Hatay. In June 1939. Syria did not recognize the incorporation of Hatay into Turkey and the issue is still disputed until the present time.

The emerging threat of Adolf Hitler induced a fear of being outflanked by Nazi Germany if France relinquished its colonies in the Middle East. That, coupled with lingering imperialist inclinations in some levels of the French government, led France to reconsider its promises and refuse to ratify the treaty. Also, France ceded the Sanjak of Alexandretta, whose territory was guaranteed as part of Syria in the treaty, to Turkey. Riots again broke out, Atassi resigned, and Syrian independence was deferred until after World War II.

With the fall of France in 1940 during World War II, Syria came under the control of the Vichy Government until the British and Free French invaded and occupied the country in July 1941. Syria proclaimed its independence again in 1941 but it wasn't until 1 January 1944, that it was recognized as an independent republic.

On 27 September 1941, France proclaimed, by virtue of, and within the framework of the Mandate, the independence and sovereignty of the Syrian State. The proclamation said "the independence and sovereignty of Syria and Lebanon will not affect the juridical situation as it results from the Mandate Act. Indeed, this situation could be changed only with the agreement of the Council of the League of Nations, with the consent of the Government of the United States, a signatory of the Franco-American Convention of 4 April 1924, and only after the conclusion between the French Government and the Syrian and Lebanese Governments of treaties duly ratified in accordance with the laws of the French Republic.

Benqt Broms said that it was important to note that there were several founding members of the United Nations whose statehood was doubtful at the time of the San Francisco Conference and that the Government of France still considered Syria and Lebanon to be mandates.

Duncan Hall said "Thus, the Syrian mandate may be said to have been terminated without any formal action on the part of the League or its successor. The mandate was terminated by the declaration of the mandatory power, and of the new states themselves, of their independence, followed by a process of piecemeal unconditional recognition by other powers, culminating in formal admission to the United Nations. Article 78 of the Charter ended the status of tutelage for any member state: 'The trusteeship system shall not apply to territories which have become Members of the United Nations, relationship among which shall be based on respect for the principle of sovereign equality.'" So when the UN officially came into existence on 24 October 1945, after ratification of the United Nations Charter by the five permanent members, as both Syria and Lebanon were founding member states, the French mandate for both was legally terminated on that date and full independence attained.

On 29 May 1945, France bombed Damascus and tried to arrest its democratically elected leaders. While French planes were bombing Damascus, Prime Minister Faris al-Khoury was at the founding conference of the United Nations in San Francisco, presenting Syria's claim for independence from the French Mandate.

Syrian independence was attained on 24 October 1945, with recognition of the international community. Continuing pressure from Syrian nationalist groups and British pressure forced the French to evacuate their last troops on 17 April 1946. Although rapid economic development followed the declaration of independence, Syrian politics from independence through the late 1960s was marked by upheaval.

=== Independent First Syrian Republic (1946–1950) ===
The early years of independence were marked by political instability. From 1946 to 1956, Syria had 20 different cabinets and drafted four separate constitutions.

In 1948, Syria was involved in the Arab-Israeli War with the newly created State of Israel. The Syrian army was pressed out of the Israeli areas, but fortified their strongholds on the Golan Heights and managed to keep their old borders and occupy some additional territory. In July 1949, Syria was the last Arab country to sign an armistice agreement with Israel.

== History ==
=== Early years ===
On 29 March 1949, Syria's national government was overthrown by a military coup d'état led by Hussni al-Zaim. The cause of this coup was the shame that the Syrian Army experienced following the Arab-Israeli War. An example of this shame can be seen in what is called the Samneh Scandal of 1948. According to Patrick Seale, "President Shukri al-Quwatli and his new Prime Minister set off on a tour of front-line positions and supply points. The story has it that the two politicians noticed a pungent smell coming from a field kitchen. On making inquiries they were told that it came from burning cooking fat. Quwatli demanded that a new tin be opened and an egg cooked before him. The fat once more gave off a nauseating smell: the President tasted it and pronounced it of inferior quality. Samples were sent for testing and revealed that the fat was made from bone waste". Afterwards, Quwatli ordered the arrest of colonel for profiteering. Following this incident, officers became enraged when the common folk held their noses at them, a reference to the smell of the cooking fat. On 14 August 1949, Zaim was overthrown by his colleague Sami al-Hinnawi. A few months later, in December 1949, Hinnawi was overthrown by Colonel Adib al-Shishakli. The latter undermined civilian rule and led to Shishakli's complete seizure of power in 1951. Shishakli continued to rule the country until 1954, when growing public opposition forced him to resign and leave the country. The national government was restored, but again to face instability, this time coming from abroad. After the overthrow of President Shishakli in the February 1954 coup, continued political maneuvering supported by competing factions in the military eventually brought Arab nationalist and socialist elements to power.

During the Suez Crisis of 1956, after the invasion of the Sinai Peninsula by Israeli troops, and the intervention of British and French troops, martial law was declared in Syria. Later Syrian and Iraqi troops were brought into Jordan to prevent a possible Israeli invasion. The November 1956 attacks on Iraqi pipelines were in retaliation for Iraq's acceptance into the Baghdad Pact. In early 1957, Iraq advised Egypt and Syria against a conceivable takeover of Jordan.

In November 1956, Syria signed a pact with the Soviet Union, providing a foothold for Communist influence within the government in exchange for planes, tanks, and other military equipment being sent to Syria. This increase in the strength of Syrian military technology worried Turkey, as it seemed feasible that Syria might attempt to retake Iskenderon, a formerly Syrian city now in Turkey. On the other hand, Syria and the USSR accused Turkey of massing its troops at the Syrian border. During this standoff, Communists gained more control over the Syrian government and military. Only heated debates in the United Nations (of which Syria was an original member) lessened the threat of war.

=== Joining the United Arab Republic ===
Syria's political instability during the years after the 1954 coup, the parallelism of Syrian and Egyptian policies, and the appeal of Egyptian President Gamal Abdal Nasser's leadership in the wake of the Suez crisis created support in Syria for union with Egypt. On 1 February 1958, Syrian president Shukri al-Kuwatli and Nasser announced the merging of the two countries, creating the United Arab Republic, and all Syrian political parties, as well as the Communists therein, ceased overt activities. The merger was approved in a 1958 referendum.

=== 1961–1963 ===
Discontent with Egyptian dominance of the UAR led elements opposed to the union under Abd al-Karim al-Nahlawi to seize power on 28 September 1961. Two days later, Syria re-established itself as the Syrian Arab Republic. Frequent coups, military revolts, civil disorders and bloody riots characterized the 1960s. The 8 March 1963 coup resulted in installation of the National Council of the Revolutionary Command (NCRC), a group of military and civilian officials who assumed control of all executive and legislative authority. The takeover was engineered by members of the Ba'ath Party led by Michel Aflaq and Salah al-Din al-Bitar. The new cabinet was dominated by Ba'ath members; the moderate al-Bitar became premier.

== See also ==
- Modern history of Syria
