= Maamun al-Kuzbari =

Syrian lawyer, academic and politician (1914–1998)

- مأمون الكزبري
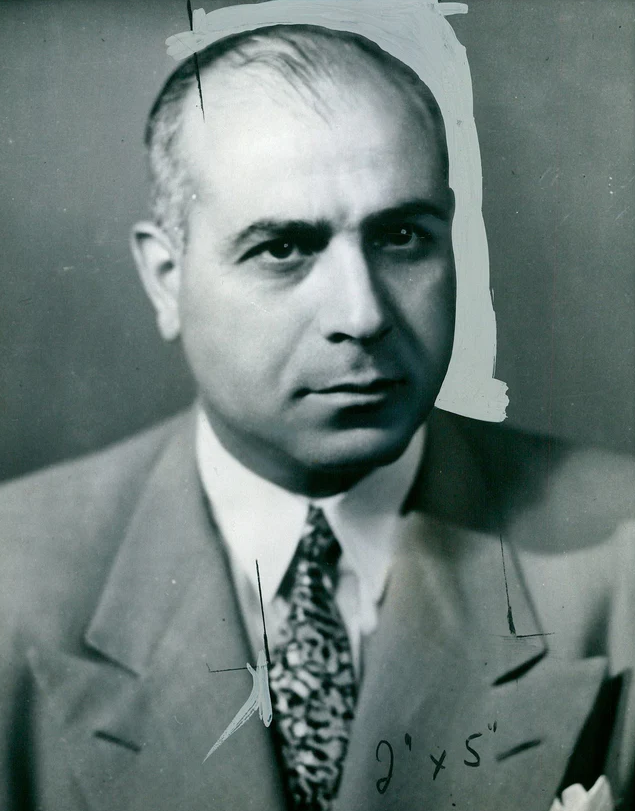
- Kuzbari in 1961

Acting President of Syria
- In office 25 February 1954 – 28 February 1954
- Preceded by: Adib Shishakli
- Succeeded by: Hashim al-Atassi

Prime Minister of Syria
- In office 29 September 1961 – 20 November 1961
- Preceded by: Abdel Hamid al-Sarraj (as part of the UAR)
- Succeeded by: Izzat al-Nuss

Vice President of Syria
- In office 25 February 1952 – 28 February 1954
- Preceded by: Office established
- Succeeded by: Sabri al-Asali (as part of the United Arab Republic); Muhammad Umran (as part of Ba'athist Syria)

Speaker of the Parliament of Syria
- In office 24 October 1953 – 16 February 1954
- Preceded by: Nazim al-Kudsi
- Succeeded by: Nazim al-Kudsi
- In office 12 December 1961 – 12 September 1962
- Succeeded by: Said al-Ghazzi

Personal details
- Born: 1914 Damascus, Ottoman Syria, Ottoman Empire
- Died: 2 March 1998 (aged 83–84) Beirut, Lebanon
- Party: Arab Liberation Movement

Maamun al-Kuzbari (Arabic: مأمون الكزبري, romanized: Maʾmūn al-Kuzbarī; 1914 – 2 March 1998) was a Syrian politician and literary personality who served as the acting President of Syria (29 September – 20 November 1961) and the first Vice President of Syria (25 February 1952 - 28 February 1954).

== Career ==
He studied International law at the University of Lyon's affiliate Saint Joseph University in the Lebanese capital, Beirut, and became an attorney in Damascus in 1943 and a professor at Damascus University in 1948. He entered parliament as an independent in 1953, allying himself with military strongman Adib al-Shishakli. He was elected Speaker of parliament and chairman of the Constitutional Assembly charged by Shishakli to amend the constitution. Shishakli also appointed him secretary general of the Arab Liberation Movement (ALM), Shishakli's political party. He also managed the party's daily newspaper, Al Tahrir al Arabi ("The Arab Liberation").

After Shishakli was overthrown, Kuzbari in his position as Speaker, and according to the constitution, was declared acting President in an emergency session of parliament on 25 February 1954. He succeeded in avoiding military confrontation among the supporters and opponents of Shishakli within the Syrian army and called the former President Hashim al-Atassi, whose administration was interrupted by Shishakli's coup in 1949, to come back to Damascus in order to complete his term.

Kuzbari remained head of the ALM. He participated in the new elections and returned to parliament in October of that year. In February 1955 he was appointed minister of justice under Prime Minister Sabri al Asali and in September of that same year he became minister of education under Prime Minister Said al-Ghazzi. He kept that post until June 1956. In May 1956 he became acting president of Damascus University. In 1958, under president Shukri al-Kuwatli, Kuzbari took part, as a member of the government, in unification talks with Egypt that resulted in the formation of the United Arab Republic. He was politically inactive during the union and became President of the Syrian Lawyers Bar.

Three years later he endorsed the 1961 Syrian coup d'état that dissolved the UAR. One of the leading officers of that coup was Kuzbari's cousin, Haydar al-Kuzbari, and the coup leaders asked Mamoun to form the first post-UAR government. He formed a cabinet consisting mainly of technocrats and university professors. He assumed in addition to his role as prime minister, the ministry of Defense and Foreign Affairs and acted as president until his resignation in November 1961. His main objective was to re-establish an elected democratic government through a free and democratic elections. Parliamentary elections took place in December 1961. Kuzbari was elected again as a deputy in parliament and Speaker. Nazim al-Kudsi became president. On 28 March 1962 both Kuzbari and Kudsi were arrested in an attempted coup by military strongman Abd al-Karim al-Nahlawi, but were released when it failed. He remained speaker until 12 September 1962.

He represented Syria in the Non-Aligned Movement Conferences in Bandung on 1955 and in several other international conferences.

== Exile and death ==
He was exiled after another coup on 8 March 1963 and settled for a short time in France before relocating to Morocco. He taught at Rabat, Casablanca and Marrakech Universities. He taught and published several books in Syria and Morocco in the interpretation of civil law. He actively participated in propagation of the Arab language in the Moroccan universities and courts. His books are used as reference in the Moroccan courts.

In 1996, he moved to Lebanon at the end of the country's civil war. He died in Beirut on 2 March 1998 and was buried in Damascus.
