= List of companies of Syria =

Location of Syria

Syria is a country in Western Asia. It is a unitary republic consisting of 14 governorates. From March 2011 to December 2024, Syria was embroiled in an armed conflict, with a number of countries in the region and beyond being involved militarily or otherwise. Political instability posed a significant threat to future economic development. Following the fall of the Assad regime, Syria's transitional government instituted an open market policy, which would see dozens of countries flocking to Syria. Syria's economy however, remains hobbled by oil insecurity and inflation.

== Notable firms ==
This list includes notable companies with primary headquarters located in the country. The industry and sector follow the Industry Classification Benchmark framework. Organizations which have ceased operations are included and noted as defunct.

Notable companies Status: P=Private, S=State; A=Active, D=Defunct
Name	Industry	Sector	Headquarters	Founded	Notes	Status	
Bakdash	Consumer services	Restaurants & bars	Damascus	1885	Ice cream parlor	P	A
Bank of Syria and Overseas	Financials	Banks	Damascus	2004	Bank	P	A
Banque Bemo Saudi Fransi	Financials	Banks	Damascus	2004	Private bank	P	A
Bawabet Dimashq	Consumer services	Restaurants & bars	Damascus	2002	Restaurant	P	A
Bena Properties	Financials	Real estate holding & development	Damascus	2007	Real estate investment	P	A
Central Bank of Syria	Financials	Banks	Damascus	1953	State-owned bank	S	A
Cham Bank	Financials	Banks	Damascus	2007	Islamic bank	P	A
Cham Palaces and Hotels	Consumer services	Hotels	Damascus	1983	Hotels	P	A
Cham Wings Airlines	Consumer services	Airlines	Damascus	2007	Private airline	P	D
Château Bargylus	Consumer goods	Distillers & vintners	Latakia	2003	Winery	P	A
Commercial Bank of Syria	Financials	Banks	Damascus	1967	State-owned commercial bank	S	A
Fly Cham	Consumer services	Airlines	Damascus	2025	Private airline	P	A
FlyDamas	Consumer services	Airlines	Damascus	2013	Airline	P	D
Hmisho Trading Group	Industrials	Diversified industrials	Latakia	1988	Manufacturing and steel processing	P	A
MTN Syria	Telecommunications	Mobile telecommunications	Damascus	2001	Mobile network, part of MTN Group (South Africa)	P	A
Syria International Islamic Bank	Financials	Banks	Damascus	2007	Bank	P	A
Syrian Air	Consumer services	Airlines	Damascus	1946	Flag carrier	S	A
Syrian Pearl Airlines	Consumer services	Airlines	Damascus	2008	Private airline	P	D
Syrian Petroleum Company	Oil & gas	Exploration & production	Damascus	1974	State oil	S	A
Syrian-Qatari Holding Company	Financials	Real estate holding & development	Damascus	2008	Holding and investments	S	A
Syrian Railways	Industrials	Railroads	Aleppo	1956	Railways	S	A
Syrian Telecom	Telecommunications	Fixed line telecommunications	Damascus	1994	State telecom	S	A
Syriatel	Telecommunications	Mobile telecommunications	Damascus	2000	Mobile network	P	A
United Group (UG)	Media	Media	Damascus	2000	Largest media conglomerate	P	A
Venus Centre	Consumer services	Media	Damascus	1985	Dubbing	P	A

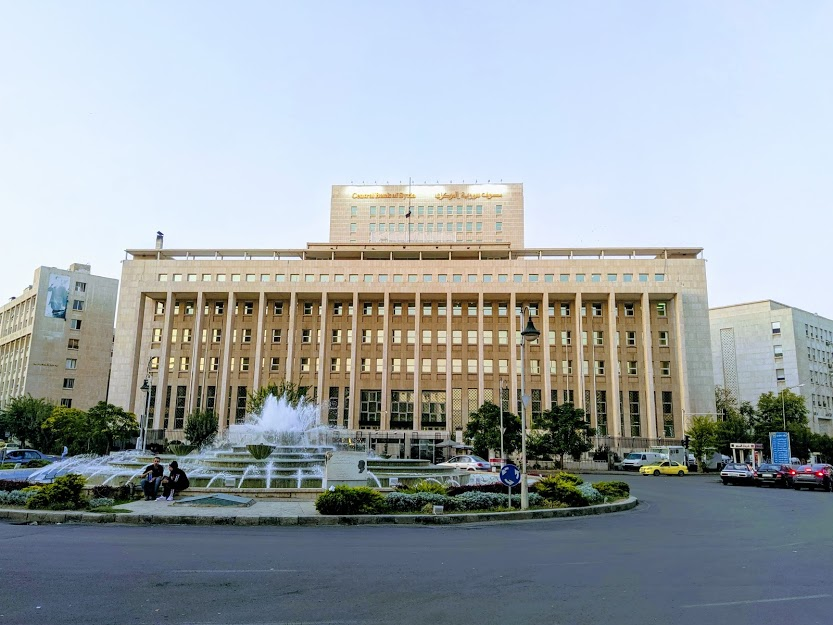
Central Bank of Syria on the Sabaa Bahrat Square.

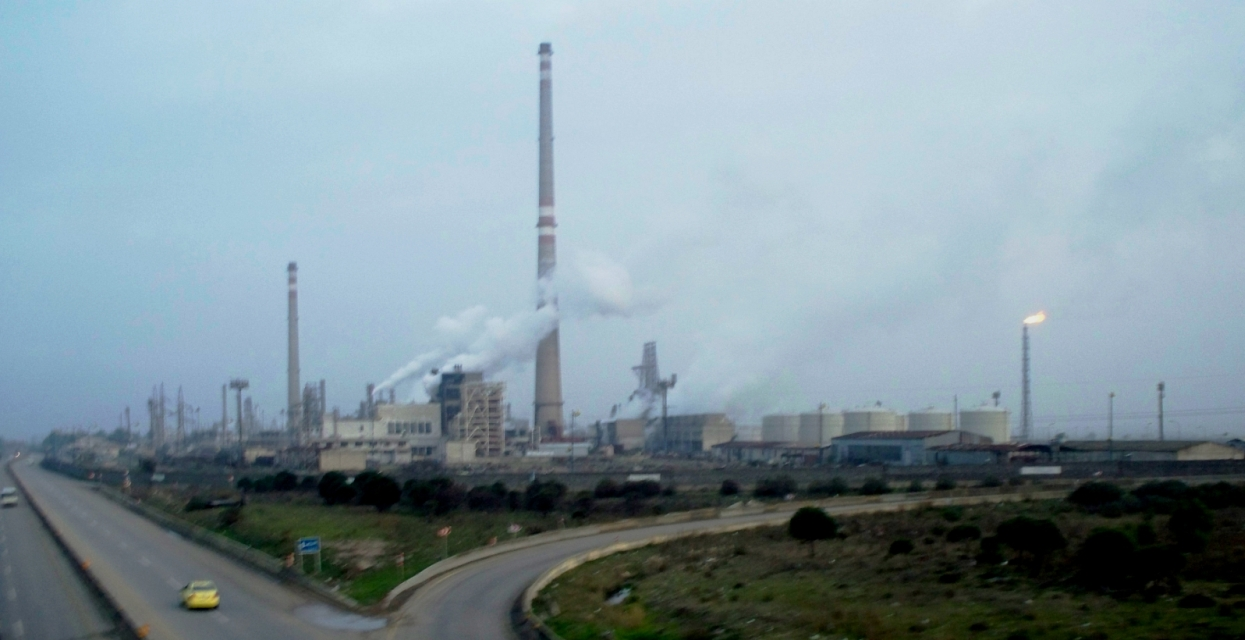
Oil refinery in Homs.

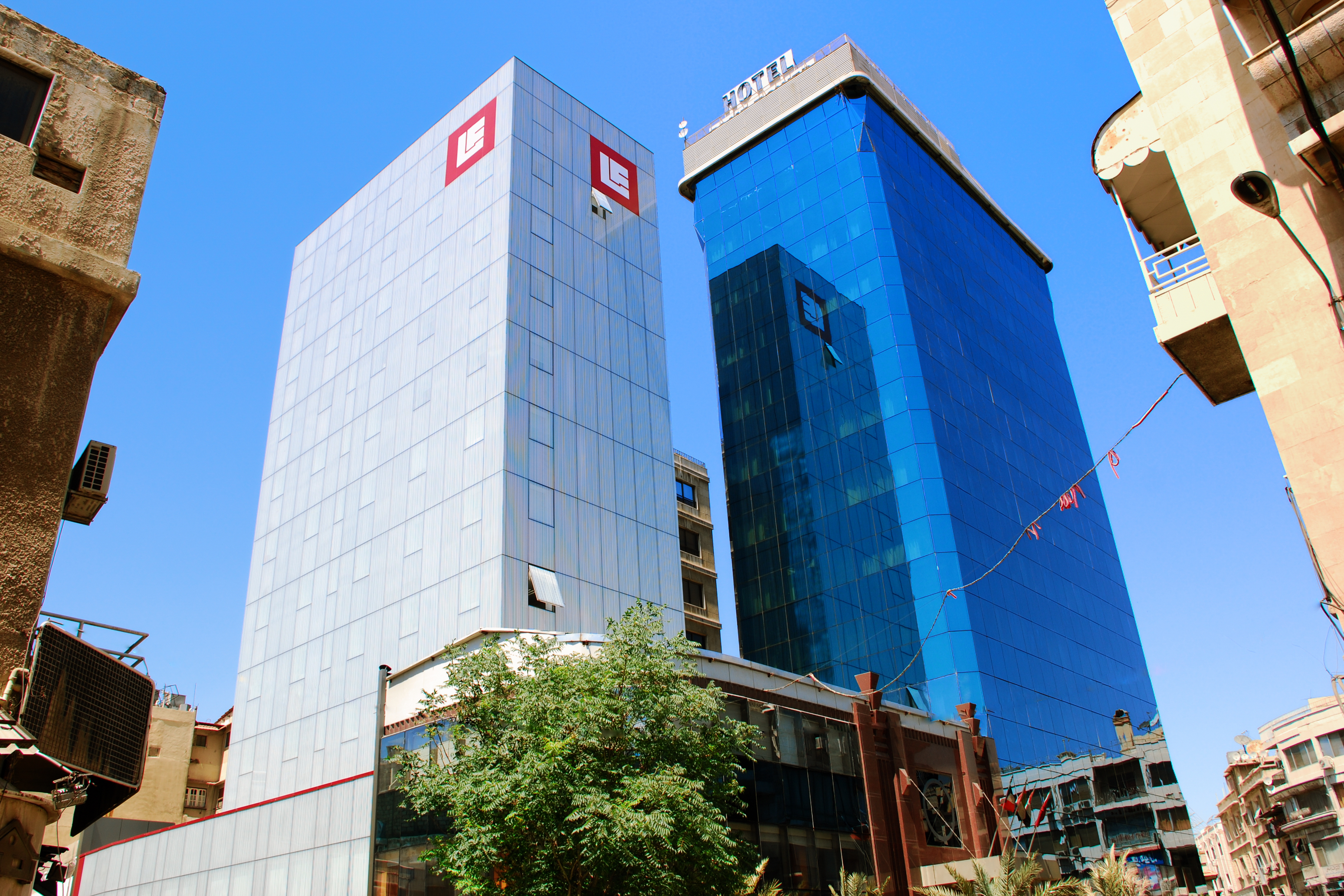
Bank Al-Sharq and the Blue Tower Hotel in Damascus.

== See also ==
- List of airlines of Syria
- List of banks in Syria
