= Kenan Yaghi =

Syrian politician

HE Kenan Yaghi كنان ياغي

Minister of Finance
- In office 30 August 2020 – 23 September 2024
- President: Bashar al-Assad
- Prime Minister: Hussein Arnous
- Preceded by: Maamoun Hamdan
- Succeeded by: Riyad Abdel Raouf

Personal details
- Born: 1976 (age 49–50) Salamiyah, Hama Governorate, Syria
- Children: 2
- Education: Damascus University; Ain Shams University; The American University in Cairo; University of Aleppo
- Profession: Politician

Kenan Yaghi (Arabic: كنان ياغي; born 1976) is a Syrian politician. He was Finance Minister between 2020 and 2024.

== Life and education ==
- 1999-2001: Postgraduate Diploma in business administration from Aleppo University
- 2005: Master's degree in Finance from Ain Shams University in Egypt, high diploma from the American University of Cairo in the establishment and Management of Investment portfolios, Business Management Degree from Aleppo University
- 2006-2015: Director of Department of Treasury, Director of Directorate of Banking Operations and Head of State Securities Management in Central Bank of Syria
- 2010: PhD in Business Administration, “Investment and Finance” from Damascus University
- 2015-2020: Deputy Executive Chairman of Damascus Securities Exchange

== Career ==
Yaghi became Finance Minister in 2020, joining the First Hussein Arnous government.

He was reappointed in 2021, as part of the Second Hussein Arnous government.
