= Arab Bank Syria =

Bank of Syria

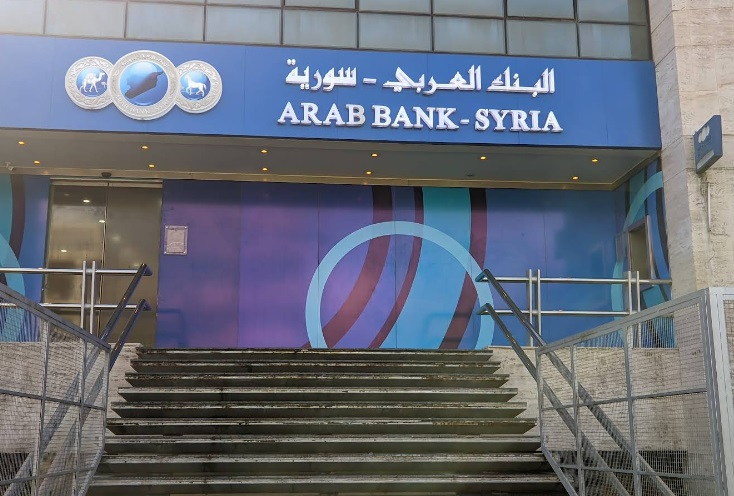
- Agency in Damascus
- Native name: البنك العربي سور
- Type: Subsidiary
- Traded as: DSE: ARBS
- ISIN: SY0021100027
- Industry: Financial services
- Founded: 2005; 21 years ago
- Headquarters: Damascus, Syria
- Number of locations: 12 (2025)
- Area served: Syria
- Key people: Ahmad Jamal Zidan (Country Manager)
- Total assets: USD 144,7 millions (2025)
- Total equity: USD 42,3 millions (2025)
- Number of employees: 300 (2025)
- Parent: Arab Bank
- Website: www.arabbank.com.sy

The Arab Bank Syria, (arabic: البنك العربي سور) is a medium-rage Syrian bank. Subsidiary of the Jordanian group Arab Bank.

== History ==
During the 1940s and 1950s, the bank established a strong presence in major Syrian commercial hubs, including Damascus, Aleppo, Homs, and Latakia. During 1961–1963, Following the nationalization, the Syrian government moved to bring the banking sector under state control. Its assets were merged into the Commercial Bank of Syria.

In 2001, Syria began implementing economic reforms to transition toward a "social market economy," which included reopening the doors to private and foreign banks.

Despite the severe economic downturn and international sanctions placed on the Syrian financial system, Arab Bank-Syria remained operational, though it significantly scaled back its activities to focus on risk management and maintaining liquidity.

== See also ==
- List of banks in Syria
