= Maysaa Sabreen =

Syrian economist and public servant (born 1974)

- ميساء صابرين

First-Deputy Governor of the Central Bank of Syria
- Incumbent
- Assumed office 27 March 2025
- Governor: Abdulkader Husrieh; Mohammed Safwat Raslan
- In office October 2018 – 30 December 2024
- Governor: Mohammed Issam Hazima

Governor of the Central Bank of Syria
- Acting
- In office 30 December 2024 – 27 March 2025
- Preceded by: Mohammed Issam Hazima
- Succeeded by: Abdulkader Husrieh

Personal details
- Born: 1974 (age 51–52)
- Education: Damascus University (BA, MA, PhD)
- Occupation: Economist

Maysaa Sabreen (Note: Also spelled Maysa Sabreen, Sabrine, or variants.) (Arabic: ميساء صابرين; born 1974) is a Syrian economist currently serving as the first-deputy governor of the Central Bank of Syria. She was previously Governor of the Central Bank of Syria from December 2024 until March 2025, making her the first woman to hold this position in the institution's history.

== Early life and education ==
Sabreen was born in 1974. She obtained her bachelor's, master's, and doctoral degrees in accounting from Damascus University. She is also a certified public accountant.

== Career ==
Sabreen's career spans over 15 years in the financial and banking sectors. Before her appointment as governor, she served as the first deputy governor of the Central Bank of Syria starting in October 2018. She also represented the Central Bank as a board member of the Damascus Securities Exchange.

In her earlier roles, Sabreen worked as the director of the Government Commission Directorate for Banks, gaining experience in regulatory and financial oversight.

=== Appointment as governor ===
On 30 December 2024, Sabreen was appointed governor of the Central Bank of Syria by the new Syrian administration that took over after the fall of the Assad regime, marking the first time a woman assumed leadership of the institution since its establishment over 70 years earlier. On 27 March 2025, less than three months after her appointment, Sabreen resigned from her post and returned to being deputy governor.

== See also ==
- Economy of Syria
- Women in Syria
