= SQHC =

SQHC may refer to:

- Sporulenol synthase, an enzyme
- Syrian-Qatari Holding Company
