= SGHC =

SGHC may refer to:

- High Court of Singapore
- Sporulenol synthase, an enzyme
