= List of banks in Syria =

This is a list of banks in Syria.

== Central bank ==
- Central Bank of Syria

== Local banks ==
=== Public ===
- Commercial Bank of Syria

=== Private and Foreign ===
- Arab Bank (Syria)
- Bank Audi
- Bank of Jordan
- Bank of Syria and Overseas
- Banque Bemo Saudi Fransi
- Byblos Bank
- Fransabank (ceased in 2017)
- QNB (Syria)

=== Islamic ===
- Al Baraka Bank
- Cham Bank
- National Islamic Bank
- Syria International Islamic Bank

== See also ==
- Banking in Syria
- List of banks in the Arab world
