= Baghdad Street =

Baghdad Street may refer to:

- Baghdad Street (Damascus), in Damascus, Syria
- Baghdad Street (Singapore), in Kampong Glam, Singapore

== See also ==
- Bağdat Avenue, in Istanbul, Turkey
