= Abdulkader Husrieh =

Syrian economist and official (born 1961)

- عبد القادر حصرية

Syrian Ambassador to Canada
- Incumbent
- Assumed office 15 May 2026
- President: Ahmed al-Sharaa

Governor of the Central Bank of Syria
- In office 27 March 2025 – 15 May 2026
- President: Ahmed al-Sharaa
- Preceded by: Maysaa Sabreen (Acting)
- Succeeded by: Mohammed Safwat Raslan

Personal details
- Born: 1961 (age 64–65) Damascus
- Parent: Izzat Husrieh (father)
- Education: Durham University (PhD); American University of Beirut (Executive MBA, BBA); Damascus University (LLB)
- Profession: Economist, policymaker

Abdulkader Husrieh (Arabic: عبد القادر حصرية, born 1961) is a Syrian economist and expert in public policy and economic reform. He has a background in financial consulting, monetary policy, and economic reform, and had served as the Governor of the Central Bank of Syria between March 2025 and May 2026.

== Early life and education ==
Husrieh was born in Damascus in 1961 to a Damascene family. His father, Izzat Husrieh, is considered one of the pioneers of Syrian journalism and the founder and publisher of the newspaper Al-Alam, established in 1946.

He holds a PhD in finance from Durham University in the United Kingdom, with a focus on the role of financial markets in housing finance. He also earned an executive MBA and a bachelor's degree in business administration from the American University of Beirut, as well as a bachelor's degree in law from the Damascus University.

In addition, he has completed specialized programs in tax policy and administration at the Harvard Kennedy School and in housing finance and capital markets development at the Wharton School of the University of Pennsylvania.

== Career ==
Husrieh has held various leadership positions in international and regional financial institutions. He was a partner at "Husrieh & Partners", specializing in financial consulting and economic reform. He also worked at Ernst & Young Middle East, where he served as Market Sector Leader and Director of Financial and Tax Advisory.

In 2012, he was a member of the Finance Commission of the International Federation of Red Cross and Red Crescent Societies in Geneva. He has also played a key role in shaping financial regulations in Syria, including drafting major banking laws such as the Islamic Banking Law, the Exchange Companies Law, the Leasing Law, and the Central Bank of Syria Law.

On 27 March 2025, Husrieh was appointed Governor of the Central Bank of Syria, and was sworn in on 7 April 2025.

== Contributions to Syrian financial regulation ==
Husrieh has been involved in shaping Syria’s financial landscape. He contributed to the development of regulations for the Damascus Securities Exchange and the Syrian Commission on Financial Markets and Securities, enhancing transparency and investment conditions. He also played a role in structuring regulations for the mortgage finance sector and standardizing international financial reporting in Syria.

His expertise in financial reform has been recognized internationally, with contributions to policy development in collaboration with the World Bank and the United Nations Development Programme (UNDP). He was involved in drafting Syria’s Public-Private Partnership Law and its regulatory framework.

== Publications and writing ==
Husrieh has written on economic policies, banking regulations, and financial reform. His articles have been published in Al-Watan, Al-Thawra, Baladna, Syria Today, and Al-Majalla.

== See also ==
- Central Bank of Syria
- Economy of Syria
