= 52nd G7 summit =

2026 international leader meeting in France

52nd G7 Summit

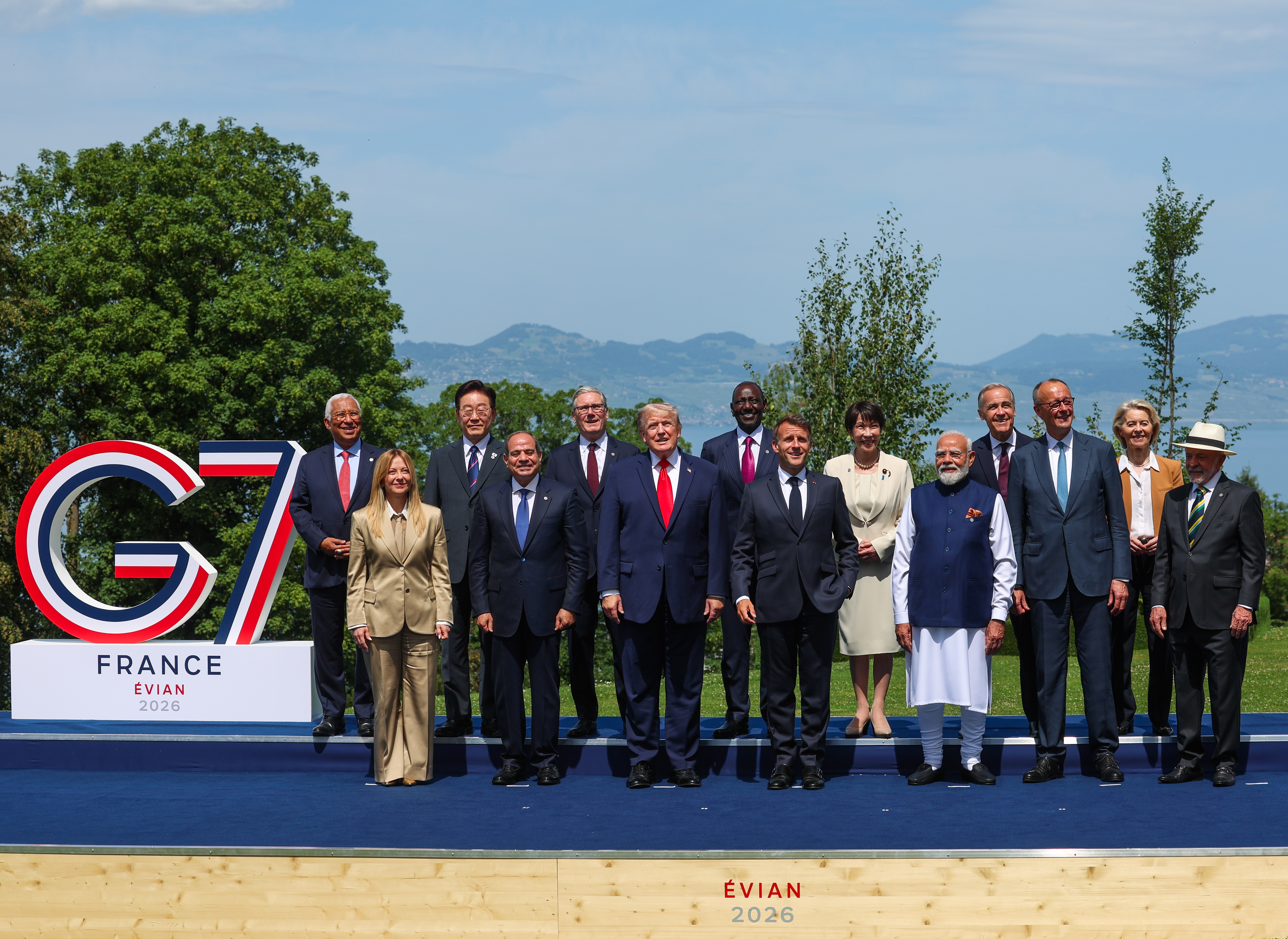
- Host country: France
- Date: 15–17 June 2026
- Cities: Évian-les-Bains
- Venues: Hôtel Royal
- Participants: Canada; France; Germany; Italy; Japan; United Kingdom; United States; European Union; Invited countries: Brazil; Egypt; India; Kenya; South Korea; Qatar; Ukraine; United Arab Emirates
- Follows: 51st G7 summit
- Precedes: 53rd G7 summit
- Website: www.elysee.fr/en/G7evian

The 52nd G7 Summit was an annual summit of the G7 held from 15 to 17 June 2026 in Évian-les-Bains, Haute-Savoie, France.

Évian-les-Bains previously hosted the 29th G8 summit in 2003. The 2026 summit therefore makes Évian the first French town to host a G7 or G8 leaders' summit twice.

At the summit, leaders issued joint statements on Ukraine, the Middle East, critical minerals and global economic imbalances, among other issues.

== Background ==
The summit was held on the French shore of Lake Geneva, close to the border with Switzerland. Because delegations were expected to arrive through Geneva Airport, the event required security coordination between France, Switzerland and the Swiss cantons of Geneva, Vaud and Valais.

The summit had initially been announced for 14–16 June 2026, but was later postponed by a day to 15–17 June, to avoid a clash with the planned UFC Freedom 250 mixed martial arts event held on US president Donald Trump's birthday.

French president Emmanuel Macron made the reduction of global economic imbalances a priority for France's G7 presidency, citing industrial overcapacity, underinvestment, excessive debt, deregulation and low private investment in developing countries among the threats to economic stability.

The summit took place in the aftermath of reports of a memorandum of understanding between the US and Iran aimed at ending the Iran War and reopening the Strait of Hormuz. Trump signed the memorandum at the Palace of Versailles on 17 June 2026, during a dinner hosted by Macron after the summit.

== Participants ==
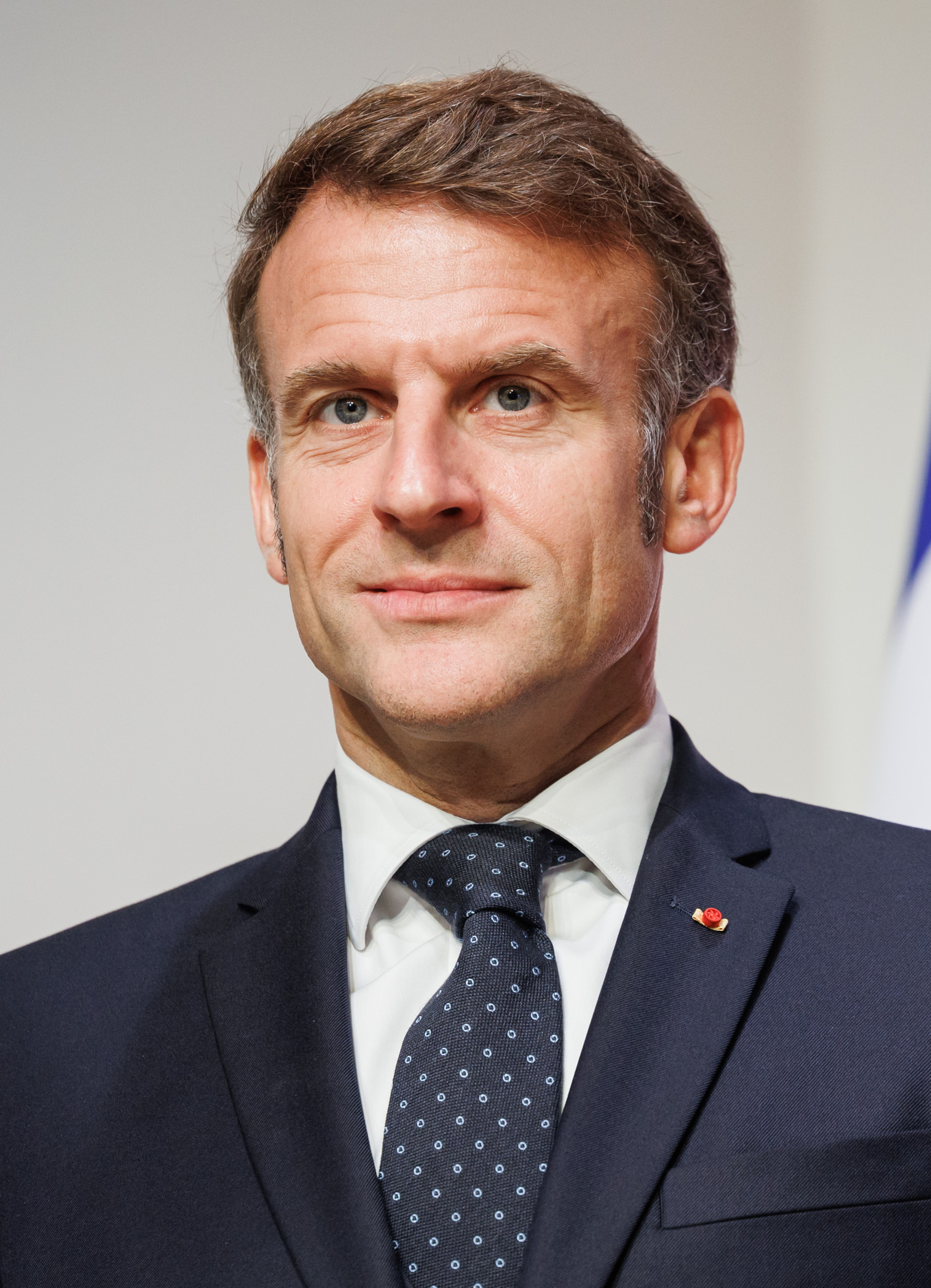
Emmanuel Macron chaired the 52nd G7 summit.

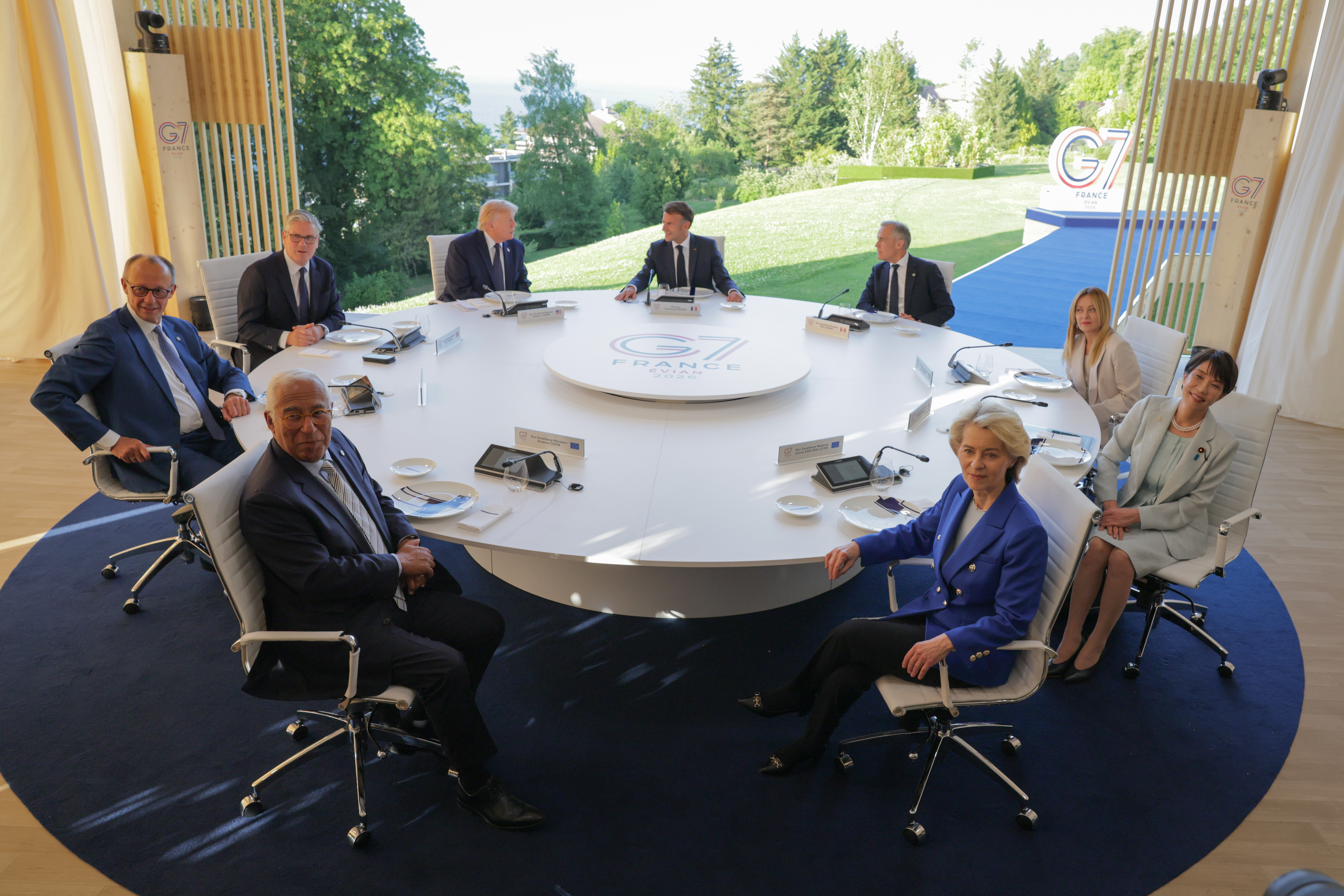
Working session on 15 June 2026

Core G7 Members The host state and leader are shown in bold text.
Member	Represented by	Title
Canada	Mark Carney	Prime Minister
**France (host)**	**Emmanuel Macron**	**President**
Germany	Friedrich Merz	Chancellor
Italy	Giorgia Meloni	Prime Minister
Japan	Sanae Takaichi	Prime Minister
United Kingdom	Keir Starmer	Prime Minister
United States	Donald Trump	President
European Union	António Costa	Council President
European Union	Ursula von der Leyen	Commission President
**Invitees**
Country	Represented by	Title
Brazil	Luiz Inácio Lula da Silva	President
Egypt	Abdel Fattah el-Sisi	President
India	Narendra Modi	Prime Minister
Kenya	William Ruto	President
South Korea	Lee Jae Myung	President
Qatar	Tamim bin Hamad Al Thani	Emir
Ukraine	Volodymyr Zelenskyy	President
United Arab Emirates	Mohamed bin Zayed Al Nahyan	President

=== Invited leaders who did not attend ===
Country	Invited leader	Title
Saudi Arabia	Mohammed bin Salman	Crown Prince
Syria	Ahmed al-Sharaa	President

While Switzerland was not officially invited, the President of the Swiss Confederation Guy Parmelin welcomed the heads of state and government of the participating countries at Geneva Airport and attended other venues.

The 2026 summit was the first G7 leaders' summit attended by Japanese Prime Minister Sanae Takaichi. The 2026 summit was the final G7 summit attended by French President Emmanuel Macron and British Prime Minister Keir Starmer.

The participation of Giorgia Meloni and Sanae Takaichi made it the third time two G7 female leaders were principals in the G7 summit.

France invited several non-G7 countries to participate in the summit and in preparatory discussions. Brazil, India, Kenya and South Korea were included as partner countries in the Sherpa track.

Macron invited Indian Prime Minister Narendra Modi and Brazilian President Luiz Inácio Lula da Silva to participate in the summit during meetings held around the AI Impact Summit in New Delhi in February 2026.

Additional invitations were extended to leaders from Egypt, Qatar, Saudi Arabia, Syria, Ukraine and the United Arab Emirates. Syria had been invited to participate in a G7 summit for the first time. The invitation for Syrian president Ahmed al-Sharaa was hand-delivered to Syrian Finance Minister Mohammed Yisr Barnieh, who attended the group's financial talks in Paris, though al-Sharaa did not ultimately attend. Saudi Arabia's crown prince, Mohammed bin Salman, said that he was unable to attend the summit, citing prior commitments.

South Africa was not included among the invited countries. South African officials stated that the country had initially expected to attend the summit, while the French government denied having yielded to foreign pressure over the invitation list. Kenya was invited as one of the African partner countries.

In late 2025, Macron reportedly considered inviting Chinese leader Xi Jinping to the Évian summit. Japan expressed concern to France that a Chinese invitation could affect G7 unity, amid heightened China–Japan diplomatic tensions.

== Agenda and outcomes ==
Indian Prime Minister Narendra Modi meeting with German Chancellor Friedrich Merz, 17 June 2026

Alongside its priority for a reduction of global economic imbalances, France also identified support for Ukraine, protection of children, the fight against organised crime and illegal flows, and reform of global governance as major themes of the summit.

G7 leaders adopted joint statements on mutually beneficial international partnerships, the Bundibugyo Ebola outbreak, cancer, geopolitical issues, migrant smuggling, drug trafficking, online safety for minors, balanced growth and critical mineral supply chains.

In a statement on global imbalances, leaders called for stronger International Monetary Fund surveillance of external imbalances and asked the IMF and the OECD to monitor how domestic policy in major economies contributes to those imbalances. Egypt, Kenya and South Korea also supported the statement. The discussions included concerns over Chinese export practices, industrial overcapacity, subsidies and weak domestic consumption.

The French foreign ministry described the 2026 summit as the first G7 leaders' summit to make cancer a priority, with objectives including support for research, data sharing and efforts to reduce cancer mortality. The health-related statements called for cooperation on cancer and announced more than $1 billion in funding for the response to the Bundibugyo Ebola outbreak, in line with United Nations efforts.

=== Ukraine and the Middle East ===
Donald Trump meeting with Qatari Amir Tamim bin Hamad Al Thani, 16 June 2026

Leaders reaffirmed support for Ukraine's sovereignty and territorial integrity, agreed to increase deliveries of air defence systems, interceptors and long-range capabilities, and said they would strengthen sanctions on Russia, including in the oil and gas sectors. The statement also supported Ukraine's energy resilience through the following winter and said G7 members were ready to consider extending licences to increase Ukrainian military production.

The statement on the Middle East welcomed the announcement of a deal between the United States and Iran and said G7 members were ready to contribute to its implementation. It also supported efforts to resume maritime traffic through the Strait of Hormuz and called for diversified energy supply routes and higher energy stocks. It also supported efforts to disarm Hezbollah in Lebanon, accelerate humanitarian and reconstruction efforts in Gaza, and end violence in the West Bank.

=== Artificial intelligence and online safety ===
Executives from Anthropic, OpenAI, Google and Mistral AI took part in discussions linked to artificial intelligence, online safety and the protection of minors. G7 members also said they would work with leading companies to accelerate the safe and beneficial deployment of AI and adapt the language used by AI chatbots when interacting with children.

=== Critical minerals ===
The G7 established a non-binding "Critical Minerals Resilience and Production Alliance" and agreed to coordinate on financing, traceability, stockpiling and recycling. Leaders set a target of reducing dependence on any single supplier outside the G7 and partner countries for rare earths and permanent magnets to below 60 percent by 2030, with an ambition to reach 50 percent as soon as possible. The declaration did not name China, but the initiative followed Chinese export curbs on permanent magnets that had disrupted several industries and exposed dependence on a single supplier.

== Preparatory meetings ==
Sherpa meetings took place in Versailles, Aix-en-Provence, Toulouse, and Évian from January to June 2026 and focused on the main issues to be submitted to the leaders. Representatives from Brazil, India, Kenya and South Korea also took part in these meetings.

G7 foreign ministers met at Vaux-de-Cernay Abbey on 26 and 27 March 2026, where they issued a joint statement calling for an "immediate cessation of attacks against civilians and civilian infrastructure" in Iran.

G7 environment ministers met on 23 and 24 April 2026 in Paris where they discussed a range of topics leading to four G7 consensus declarations on marine protected areas; illegal, unreported, and unregulated fishing; desertification; and water pollution. France, as G7 president, also issued two declarations on biodiversity finance and resilience in the real estate sector.

G7 trade ministers met in Paris on 5 and 6 May 2026, where they discussed global value chain pressures, non-market policies, economic coercion, critical mineral supply chains, WTO reform and cross-border e-commerce.

G7 finance ministers and central bank governors met on 18 and 19 May 2026 in Paris where they discussed global economic tensions, bond market volatility, trade strains and the coordination of critical raw material supplies.

The G7 labour and employment ministers met at the headquarters of the International Labour Organization in Geneva on 9 June 2026. Their communiqué emphasised quality jobs, decent work, artificial intelligence training, labour mobility and labour standards in critical mineral supply chains. The ministers announced a G7 conference on labour mobility and career progression in Paris in December 2026.

== Security ==
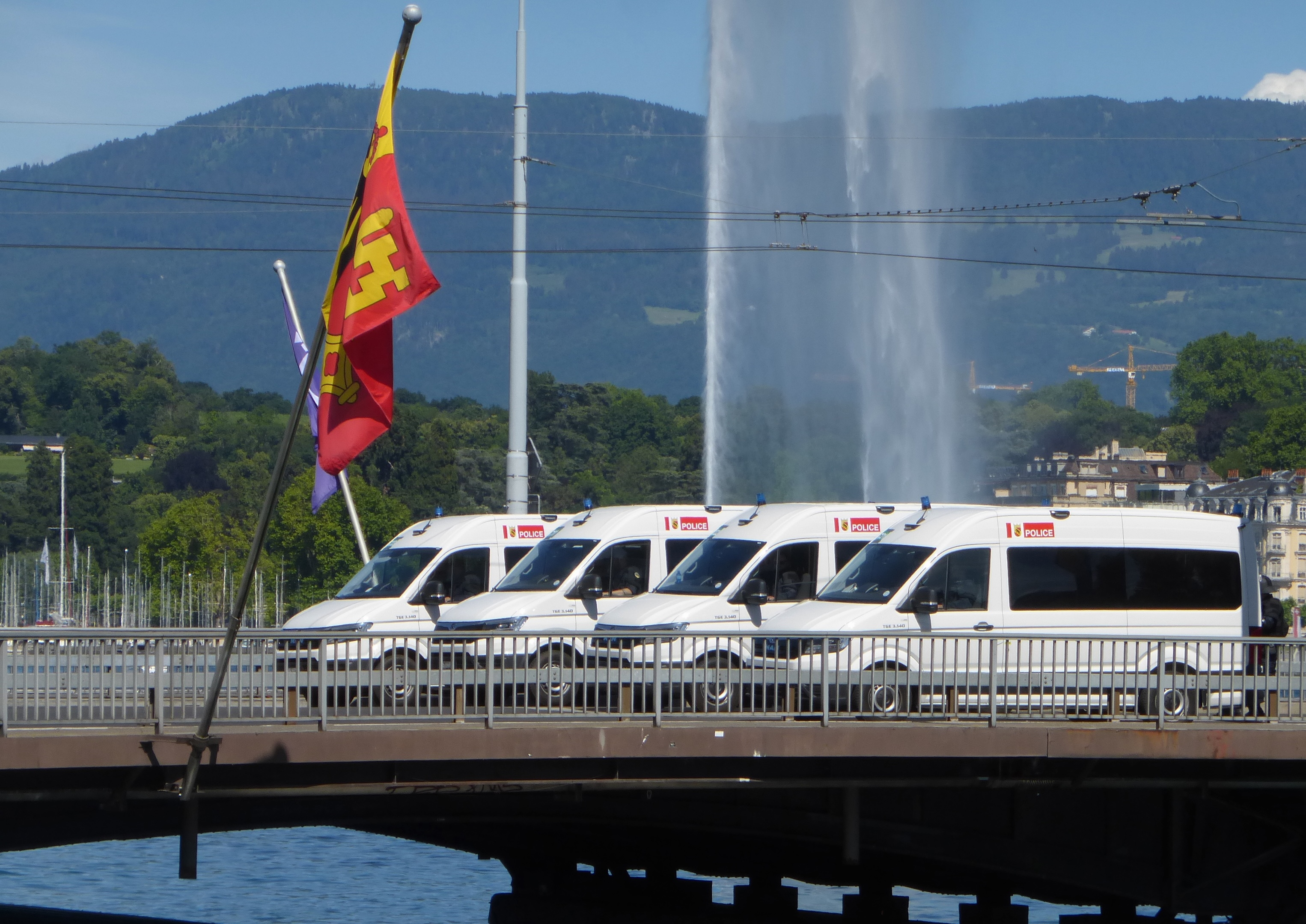
Bern police vehicles blocking the Pont du Mont-Blanc

=== France ===
French authorities established two security zones around Évian-les-Bains, Neuvecelle and Publier from 11 to 17 June 2026. The red zone, around the main summit site, was reserved for people with a compelling reason to enter. The blue zone was accessible only to people holding a G7 pass issued by the prefecture.

The French security operation mobilised more than 7,160 national police officers and 6,100 gendarmes in Haute-Savoie. Around 200 police officers were assigned to close protection for heads of state and government. The security perimeter covered approximately 1,670 km^{2} (640 sq mi), with additional support from around 900 military personnel and 830 customs officers. In total, nearly 16,000 police officers, gendarmes, military personnel, firefighters and customs officers were mobilised on the French side, with boats, motorcycles, drones, mounted units and dog units deployed as part of the operation.

The Évian-les-Bains railway station was closed from 11 to 17 June 2026. Rail services between Thonon-les-Bains and Évian-les-Bains were suspended during the same period, with replacement buses requiring a G7 pass.

More than 30 boats from the security forces were deployed on Lake Geneva as part of the French security arrangements. Security measures included restrictions on lake transport, including the temporary closure of the Évian-les-Bains ferry terminal for the CGN Évian-Lausanne service. Connections were redirected to Thonon-les-Bains and Lugrin, where a temporary terminal was arranged for the summit period.

=== Switzerland ===
The Swiss government agreed to contribute to the security costs borne by the cantons of Geneva, Vaud and Valais. The Swiss Armed Forces were authorised to deploy up to 5,000 personnel in support of the cantonal authorities.

In Geneva, approximately 7,400 police officers, soldiers and customs personnel were mobilised for the summit period. The canton of Geneva estimated the security cost at around 20 million Swiss francs, while a fund of 6 million Swiss francs was created to support businesses affected by possible unrest or security restrictions.

Switzerland and France also approved a joint military cooperation framework for the summit, setting out procedures for coordination between the Swiss Federal Department of Defence, Civil Protection and Sport and the French Ministry of the Armed Forces.

The summit led to the cancellation of public 2026 FIFA World Cup fan zones in Geneva and Lausanne.

=== Border controls and traffic restrictions ===
Switzerland temporarily reintroduced controls at the border with France from 10 to 19 June 2026. The Federal Council stated that although the summit would take place in France, Geneva, Lausanne and the wider Lake Geneva region were exposed to security risks connected with the event.

In the canton of Geneva, only seven road border crossings with France remained open from 12 to 18 June 2026: Anières, Moillesulaz, Thônex-Vallard, Bardonnex, Perly, Meyrin and Ferney-Voltaire. Crossings through railway stations and Geneva Airport remained authorised, but other crossings, including for cyclists and pedestrians, were restricted. Geneva authorities also warned of disruption to public transport, road traffic, as well as temporary restrictions affecting some public spaces.

A priority access sticker system, known as a macaron, was introduced for eligible essential workers and residents. Geneva authorities stated that access to Switzerland remained possible without one, subject to controls and available crossings.

Additional traffic restrictions were introduced on the Geneva motorway network, including restrictions on the A1 motorway between Geneva Airport and the Bardonnex customs crossing during the summit period.

=== Airspace restrictions ===
The Swiss Federal Council approved temporary restrictions on airspace in the Lake Geneva region from 10 to 18 June 2026. The restrictions applied to visual flight traffic and non-commercial instrument flight traffic in an area centred on Évian, Lausanne and Geneva Airport. The Swiss Air Force, the Geneva cantonal police and the French Air and Space Force were responsible for reinforced airspace surveillance and air policing.

== Protests ==
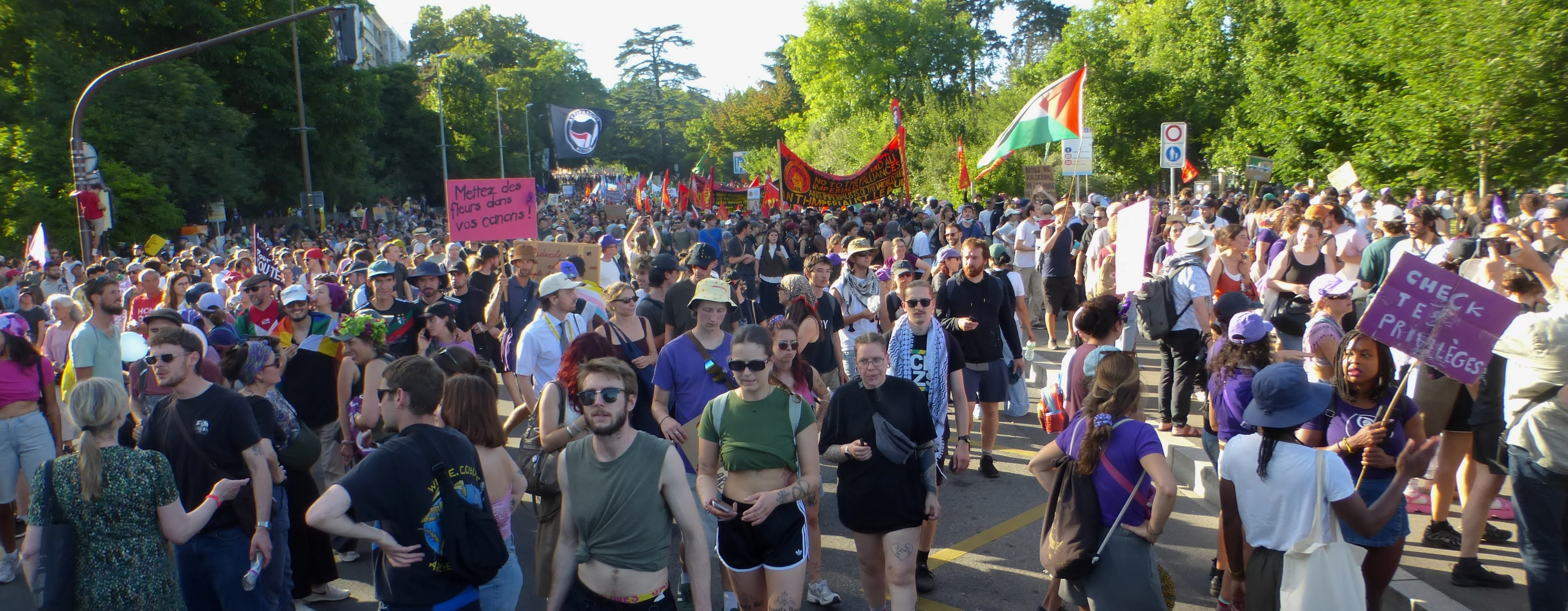
Protest on 14 June

A coalition known as "No G7" organised demonstrations in Geneva against the summit. The coalition included groups such as BDS, trade unions including the Swiss Union of Public Service Personnel, and political groups including SolidaritéS and the New Anticapitalist Party. The coalition criticised the G7 as an "illegitimate and outdated" forum of concentrated political and economic power and issued demands relating to relating to the conflicts in the Levant and Iran, an end to trade relations with Israel, opposition to US military bases, workers' rights, gender equality and LGBTQ rights.

The protest on 14 June 2026 coincided with the annual Swiss feminist strike and was presented by organisers as a call to build an internationalist response to the summit. The Canton of Geneva authorised a demonstration on the right bank of the city between Genève-Cornavin railway station and the international organisations district, but refused permission for a protest camp. A motion in the Grand Council of Geneva calling for a ban on demonstrations during the summit was rejected by 55 votes to 42.

Geneva authorities expected up to 50,000 demonstrators for the anti-G7 protest. Businesses in central Geneva prepared for possible unrest by boarding up shopfronts.

On 14 June, about 20,000 people joined the No G7 march in Geneva according to the police, while organisers placed attendance around 60,000. While initially peaceful, clashes later broke out near the United Nations building, where some demonstrators and Black bloc activists threw bottles, stones, firecrackers and flares at police, who responded with tear gas, rubber bullets and water cannons. Some protesters smashed windows at a United Nations agency and a bank, and set a Tesla Model X on fire.

Police later said that 549 people had their identities checked, 28 were taken to police premises for further verification, and three were arrested and questioned over suspected pyrotechnic use and damage to a police vehicle. Police said the containment operation was intended to prevent violent individuals from dispersing and to identify people suspected of offences. The No G7 coalition criticised the containment as an unjustifiable police operation, saying nearly 300 people, including organisers, were held for several hours before being released after identity checks.

== France–Switzerland tensions ==
The location of the summit near the Swiss border led to tensions between France and Switzerland over security costs, border management and the burden placed on Geneva. Swiss officials expressed concern that security risks, demonstrations and part of the cost of the summit would fall on Swiss territory despite Switzerland not being invited as a participant.

Swiss President Guy Parmelin wrote to Macron in May 2026 to express concerns about the summit's security implications for Geneva and the wider Lake Geneva region. Geneva officials asked France to host a protest space on French territory, but France refused to do so.

The tensions were partly linked to memories of the 29th G8 summit in 2003, when violent anti-globalisation protests in Geneva caused property damage even though the summit itself was held in Évian.

== Participating leaders ==
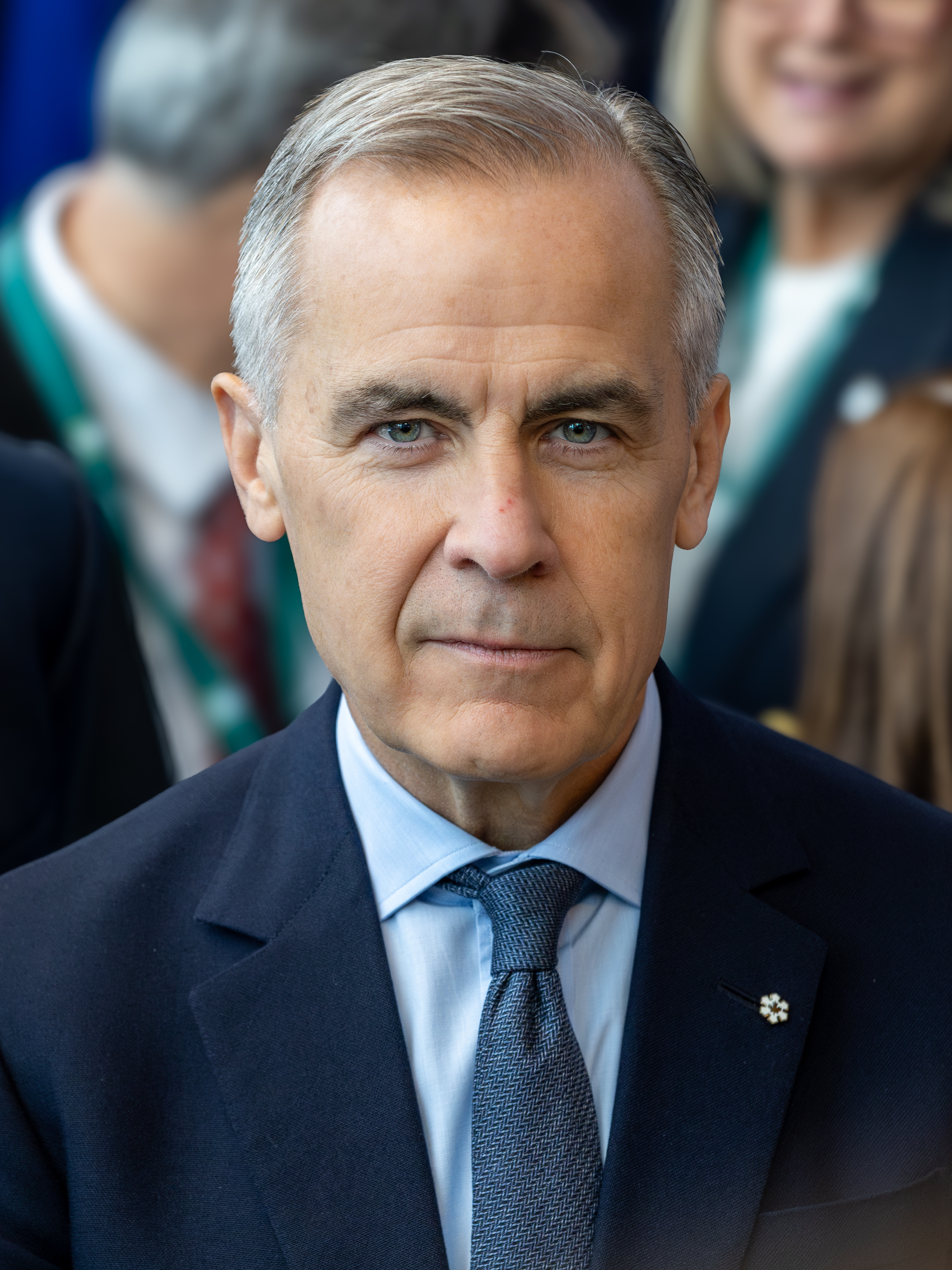
(Canada) Canada
Mark Carney,
Prime Minister

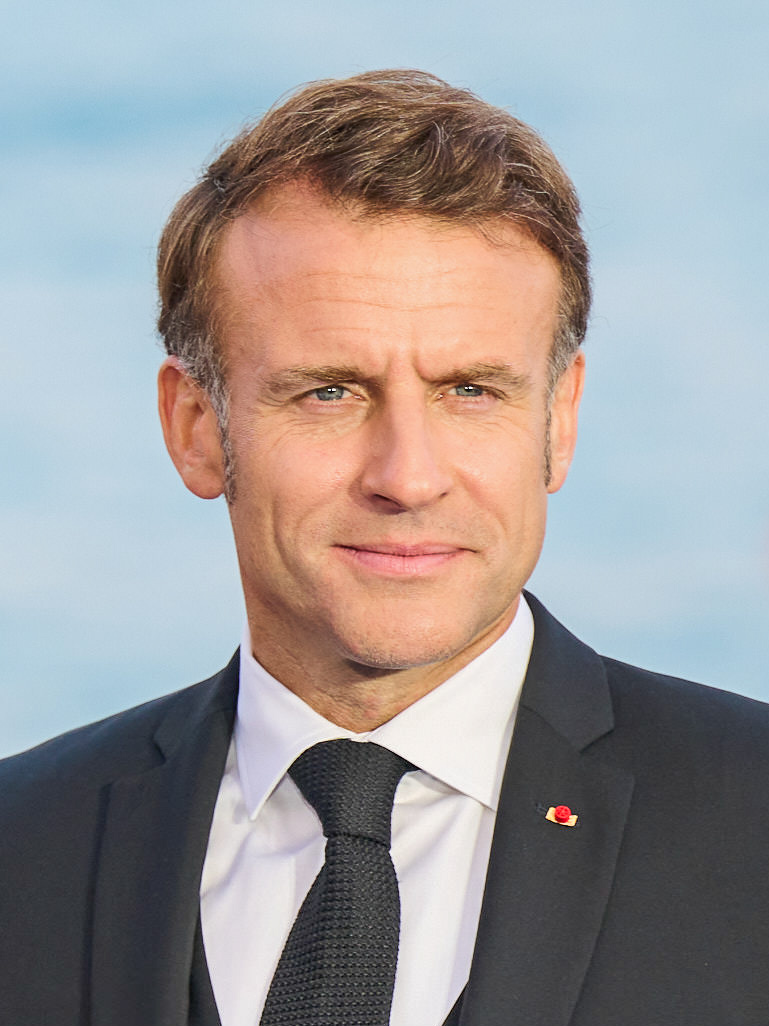
(France) France
Emmanuel Macron,
President (host)

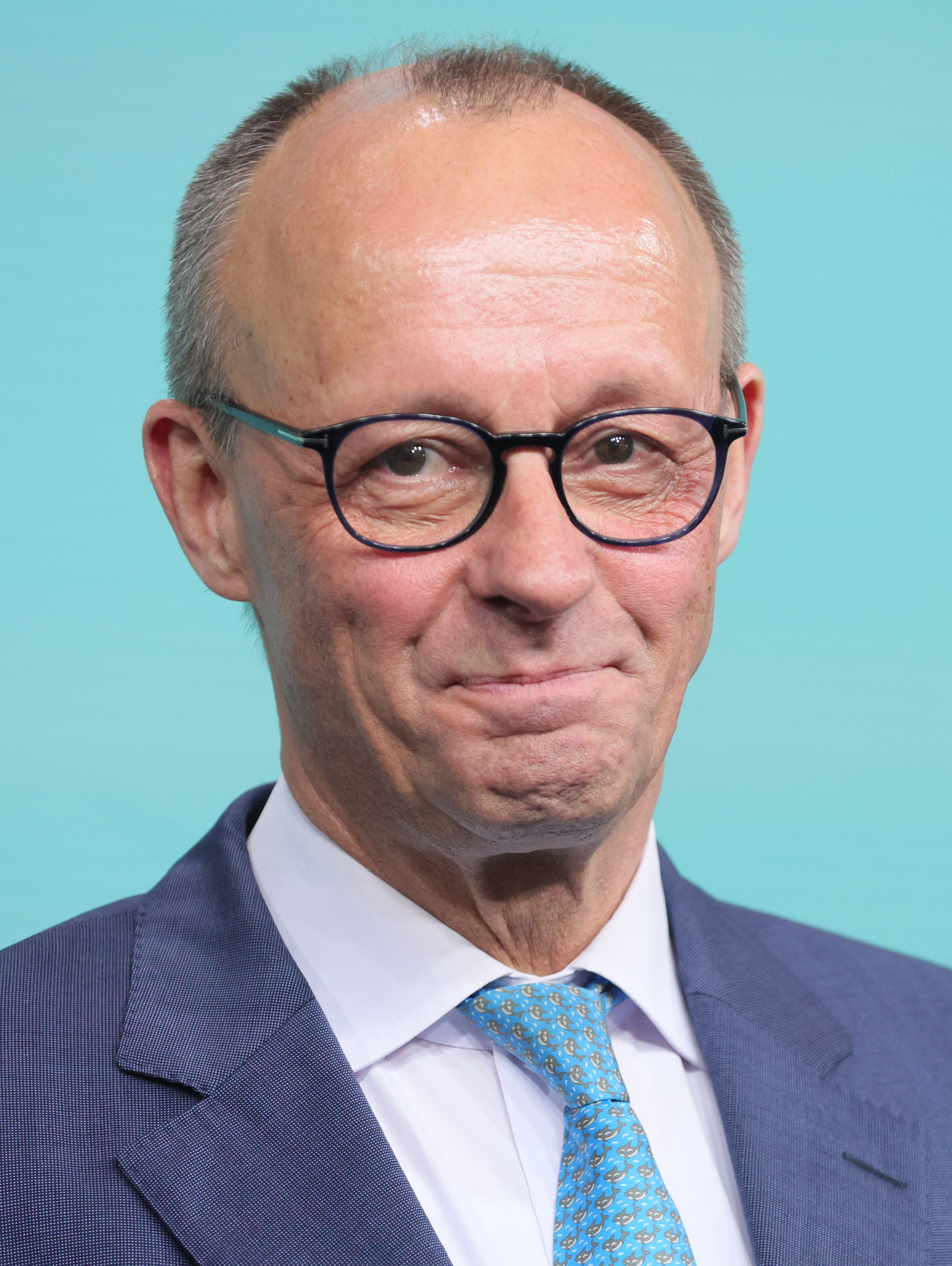
(Germany) Germany
Friedrich Merz,
Chancellor

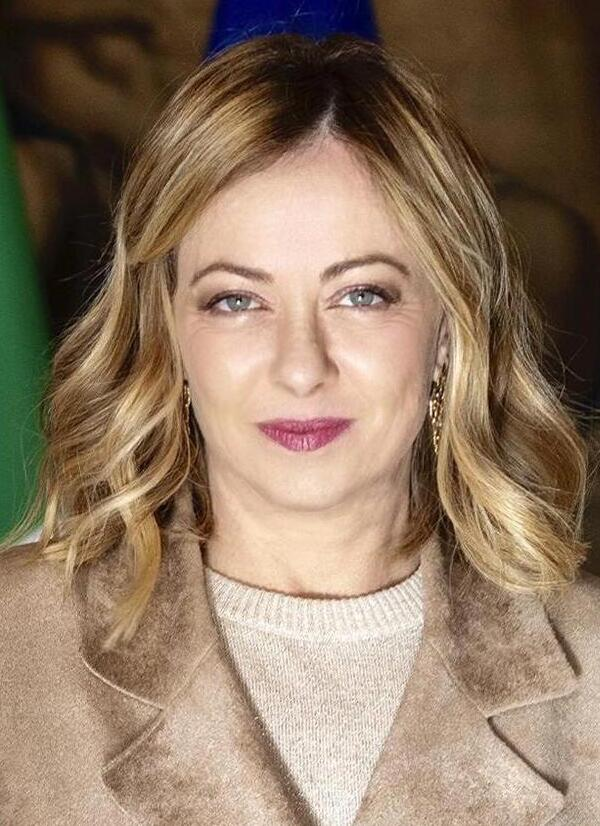
(Italy) Italy
Giorgia Meloni,
Prime Minister

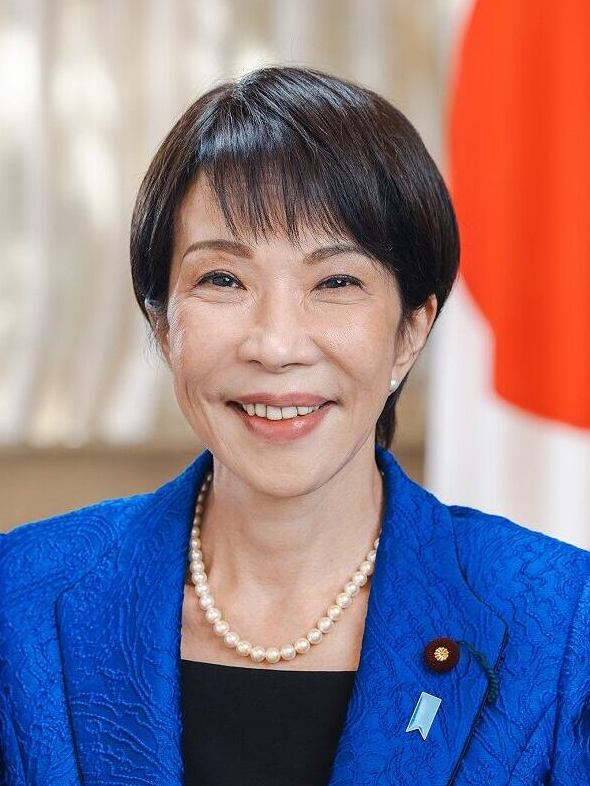
(Japan) Japan
Sanae Takaichi,
Prime Minister

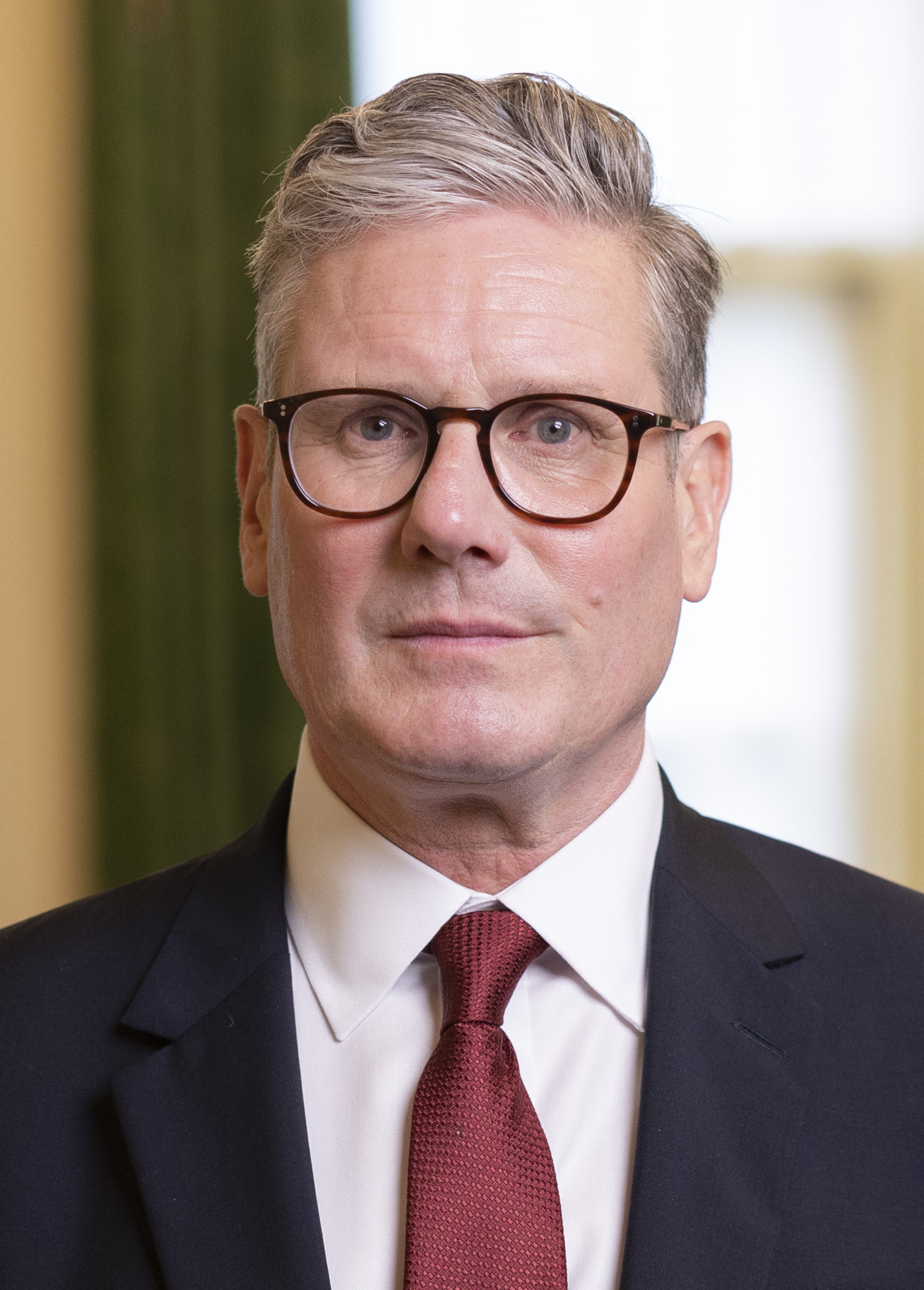
(United Kingdom) United Kingdom
Keir Starmer,
Prime Minister

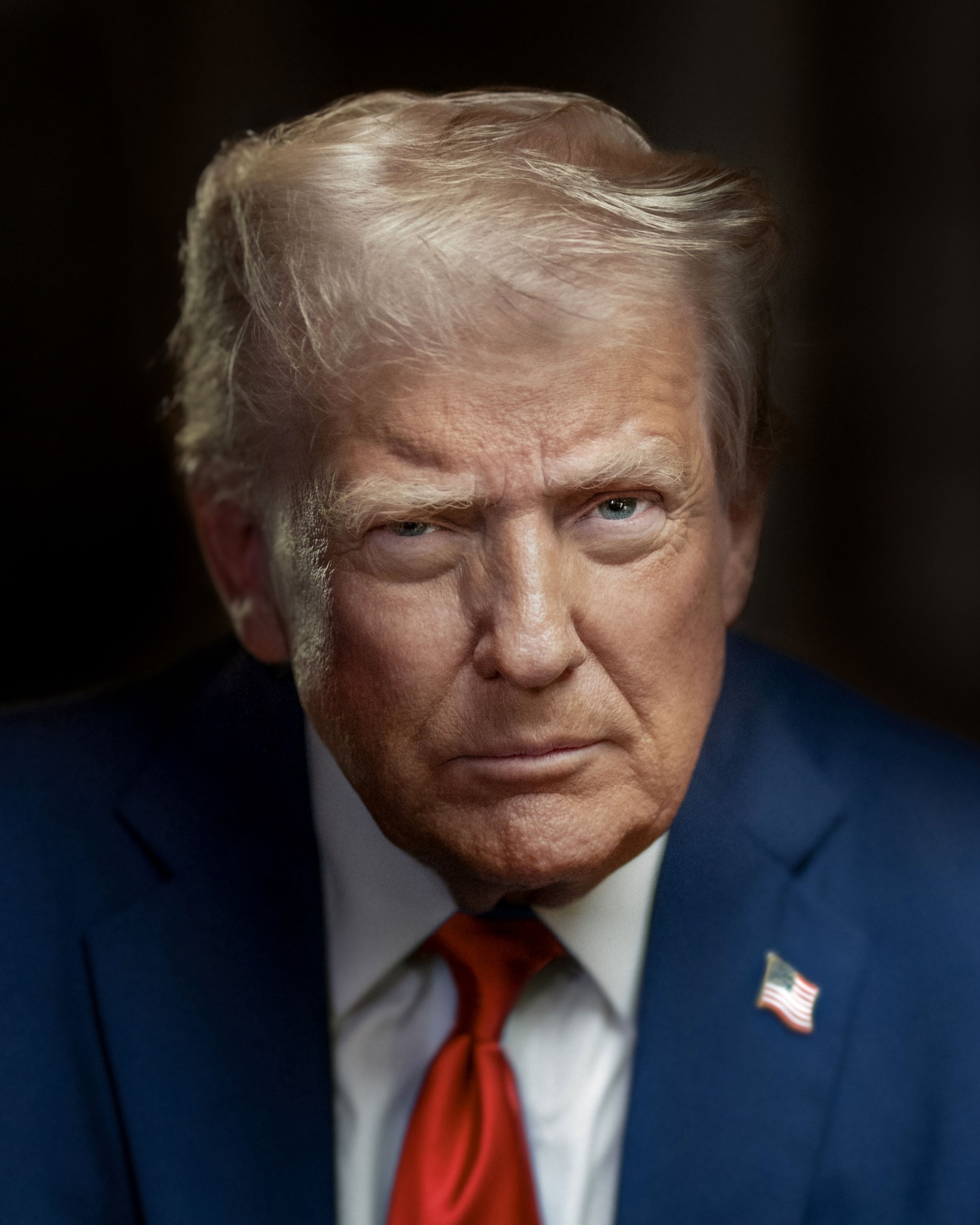
(United States) United States
Donald Trump,
President
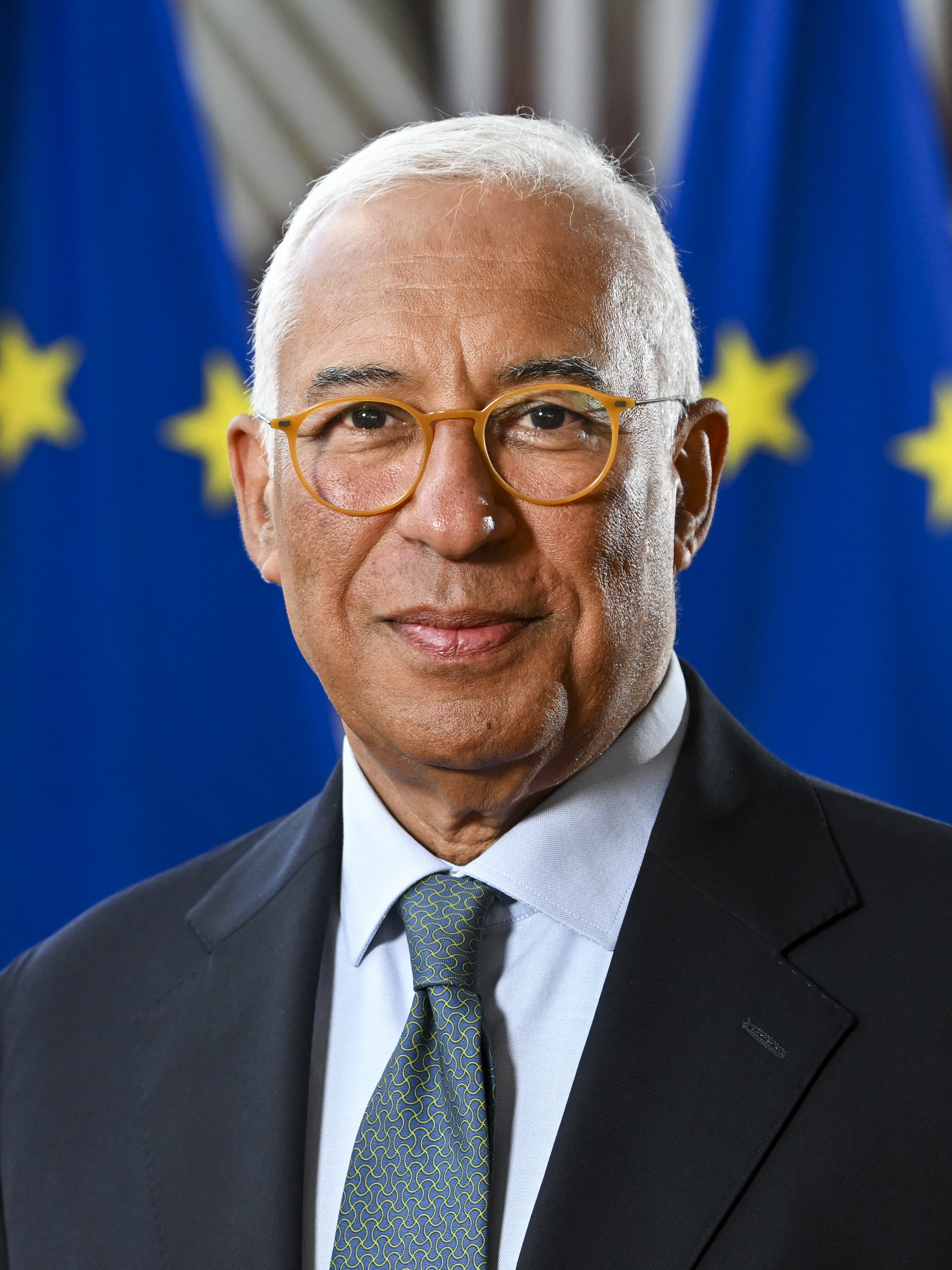
(European Union) European Union
António Costa,
President of the European Council

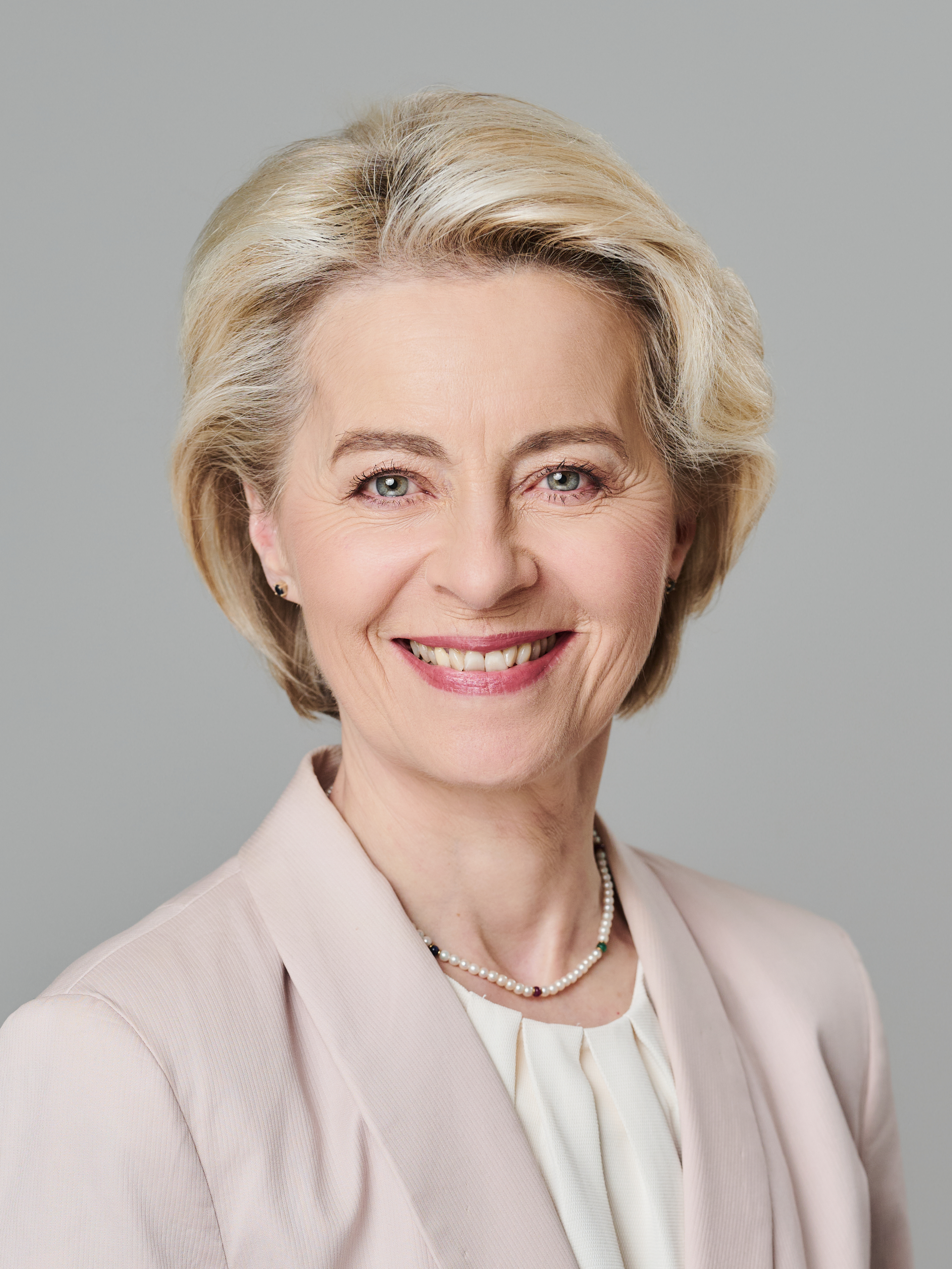
(European Union) European Union
Ursula von der Leyen,
President of the European Commission

== Participating invited leaders ==
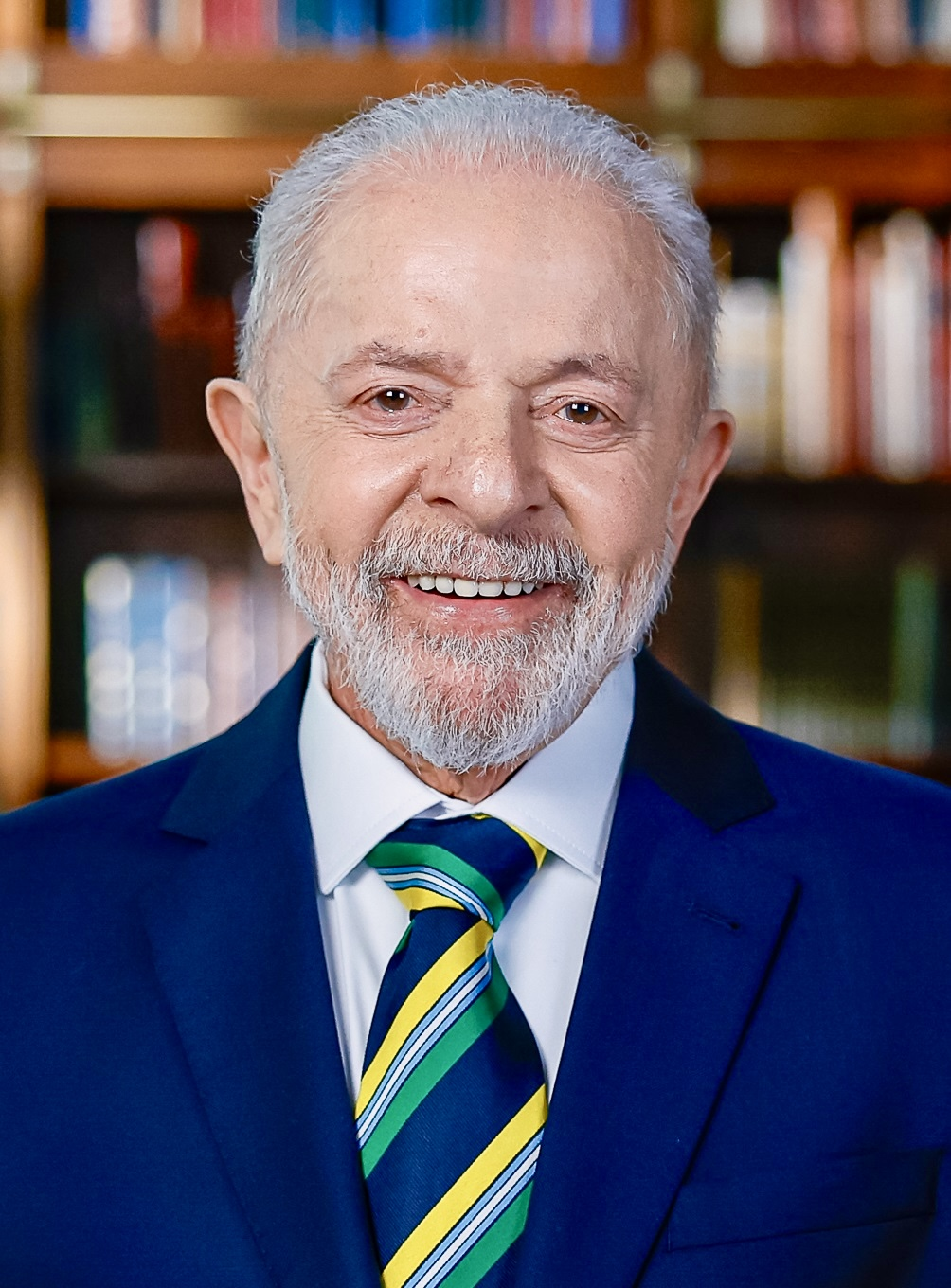
(Brazil) Brazil
Luiz Inácio Lula da Silva,
President

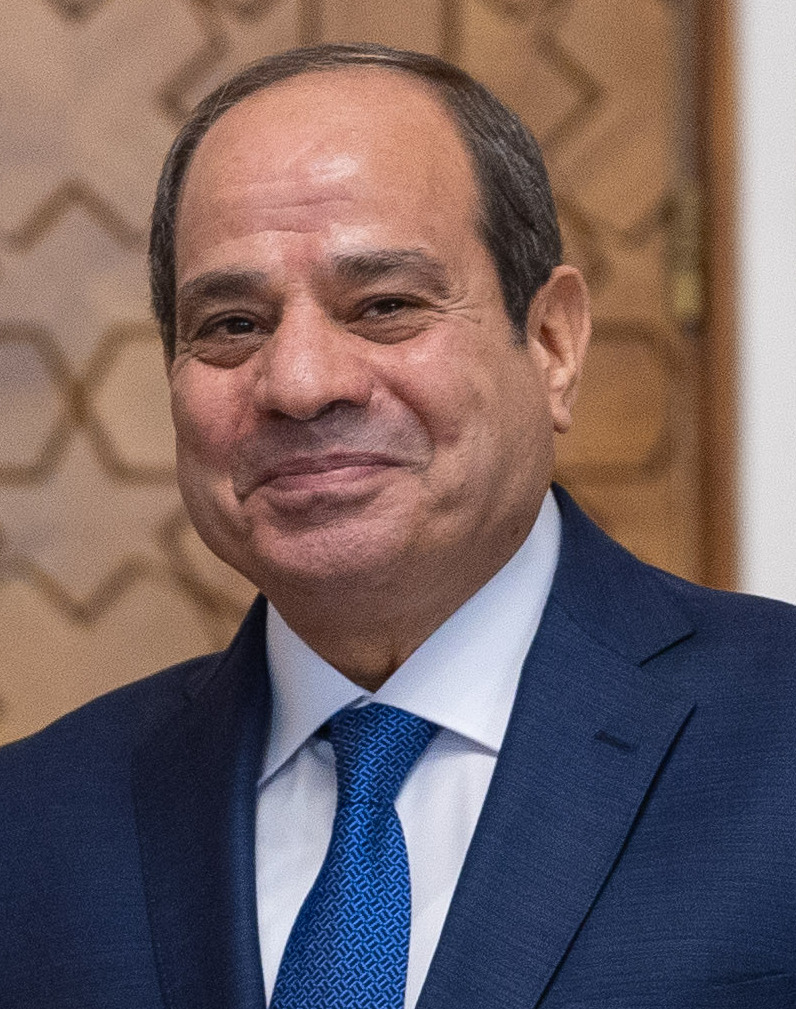
(Egypt) Egypt
Abdel Fattah el-Sisi,
President

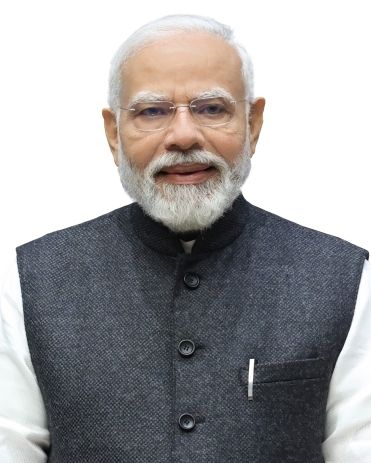
(India) India
Narendra Modi,
Prime Minister

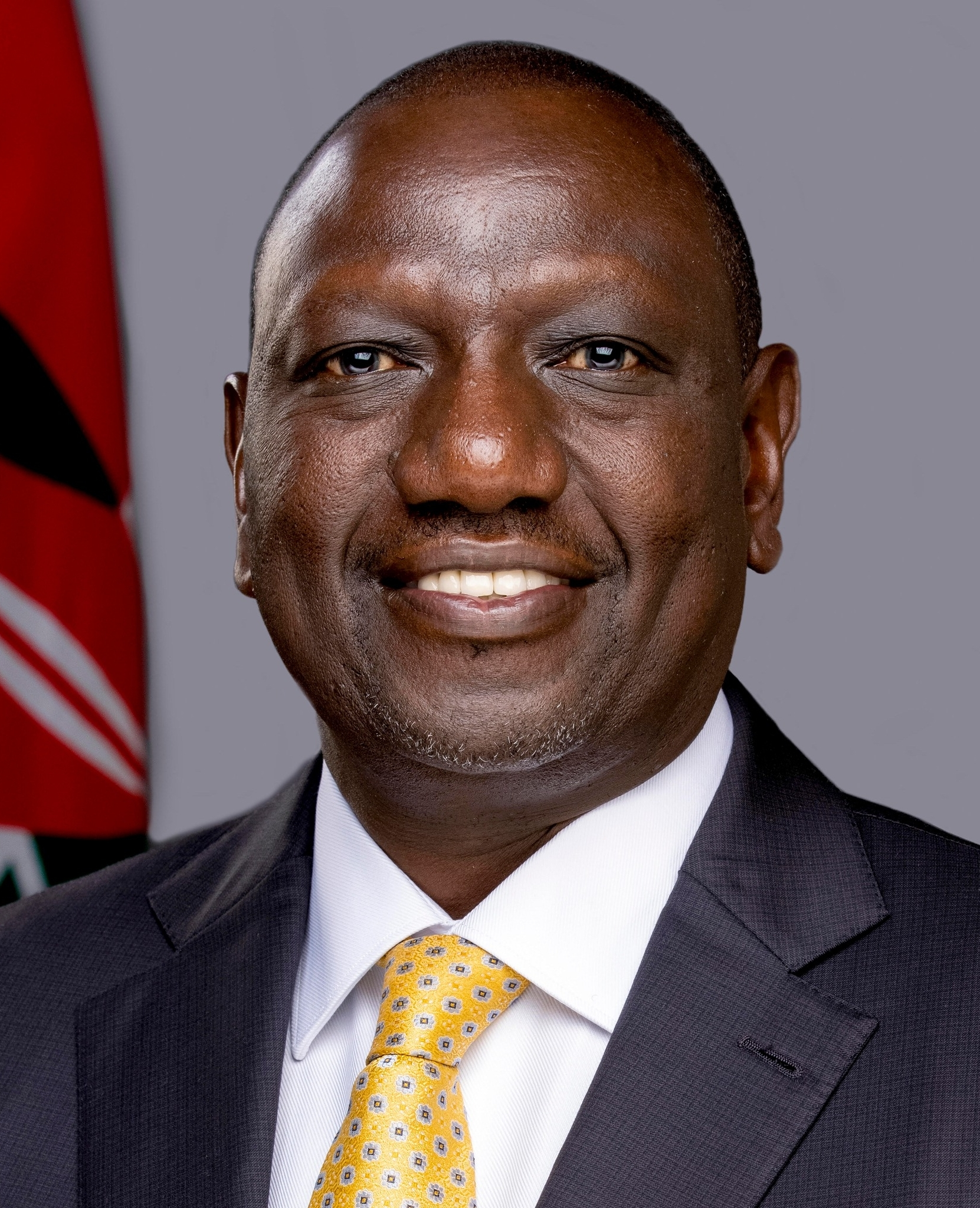
(Kenya) Kenya
William Ruto,
President

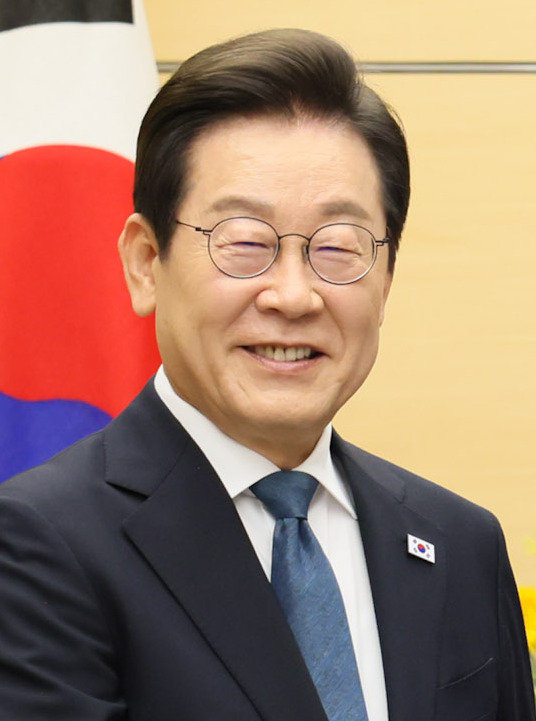
(South Korea) South Korea
Lee Jae Myung,
President

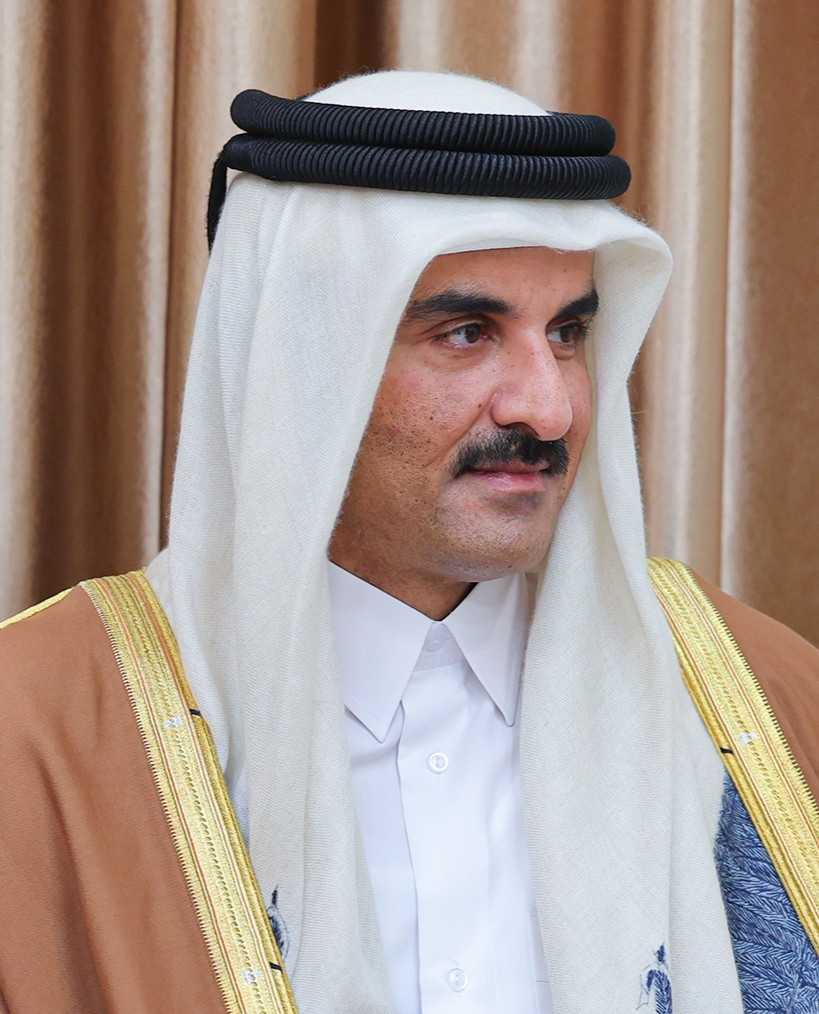
(Qatar) Qatar
Tamim bin Hamad Al Thani,
Emir

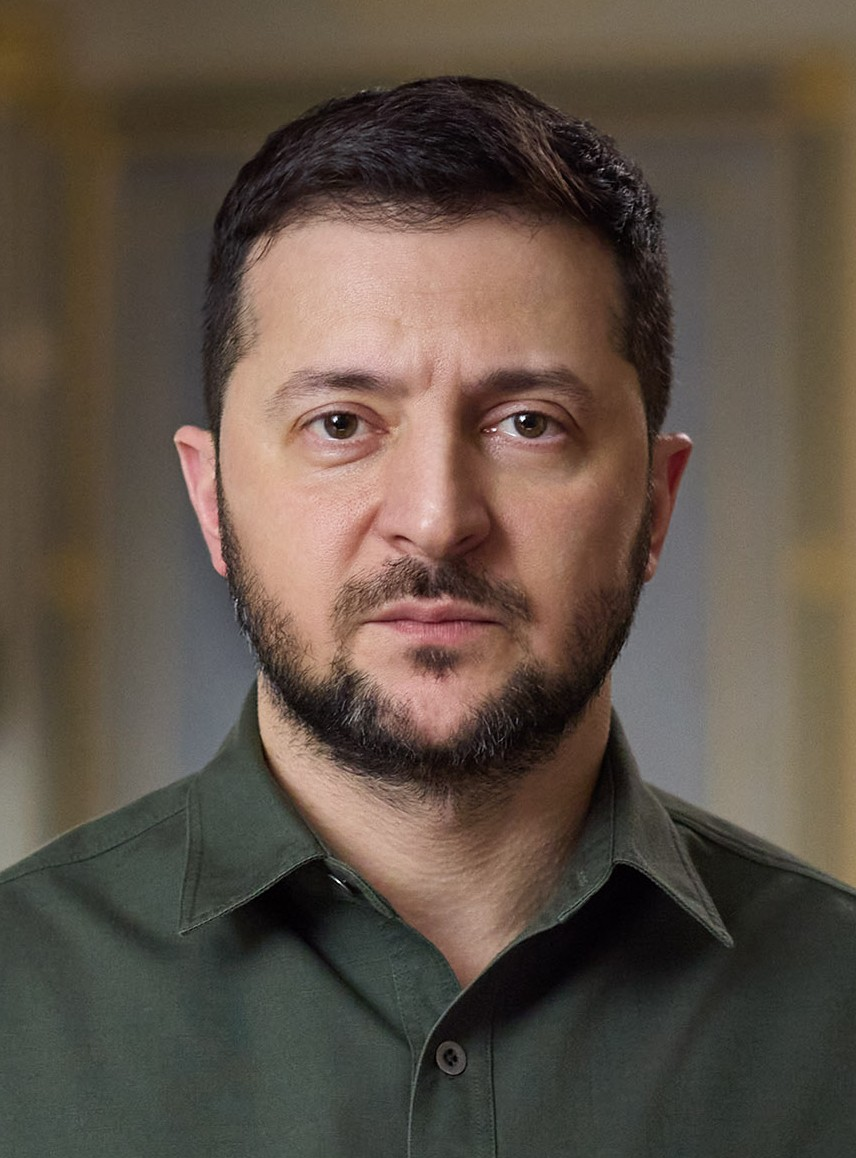
(Ukraine) Ukraine
Volodymyr Zelenskyy,
President

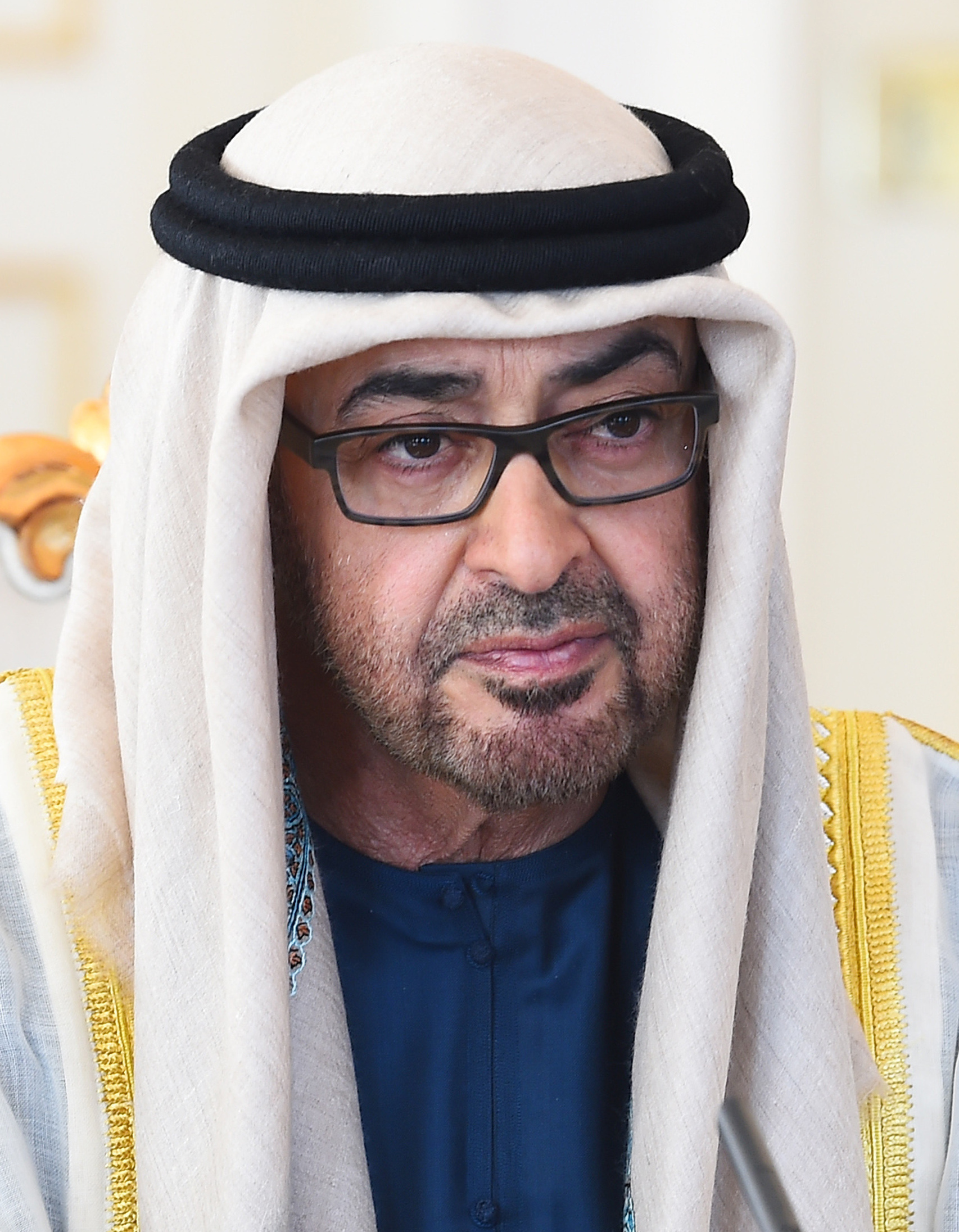
(United Arab Emirates) United Arab Emirates
Mohamed bin Zayed Al Nahyan, President
