= Banking in Syria =

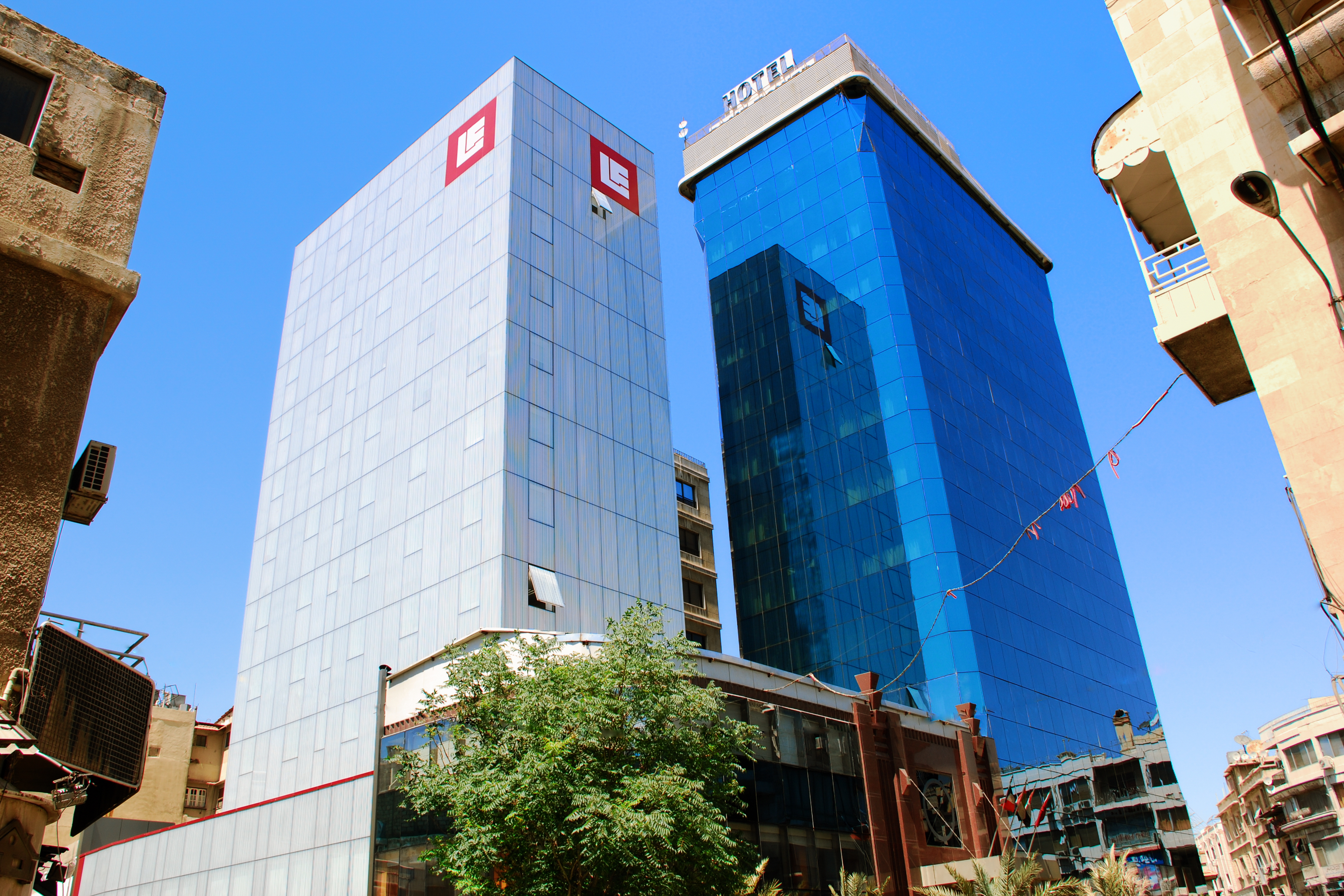
Bank Al-Sharq and the Blue Tower Hotel in Damascus

Banking in Syria is controlled by the Central Bank of Syria which also controls all foreign exchange and trade transactions. All commercial banks in Syria were nationalised in 1966. The Central Bank gives priority to lending to the public sector, while the private sector often banks abroad, a process that is more expensive and therefore a poor solution to industrial financing needs. Many business people travel abroad to deposit or borrow funds. It is estimated that US$6 billion has been deposited by Syrians in Lebanese banks.

Reforms in the financial sector commenced in the 2000s, including the introduction of private banks and granting licences to foreign banks. However, Syria’s economy is still highly regulated. Foreign banks, for example, are required to be joint-ventures, and allowed up to 49% foreign ownership, and not hold a controlling stake. As of 2018, there were 14 private banks, including three Islamic banks. All these banks had a foreign strategic partner mainly from Lebanon, but also from Jordan, Qatar, Saudi Arabia, Kuwait and Bahrain. Foreign banks are subject to sanctions imposed by various countries. There were no branches of foreign banks in Syria and no 100% owned private Syrian bank, although the laws allow both. The biggest bank by far in Syria is the government-owned Commercial Bank of Syria.

On Dec. 22, 2020, the US Department of the Treasury’s Office of Foreign Assets Control (OFAC) added the Central Bank of Syria to the Specially Designated Nationals and Blocked Persons List (SDN List).

== History ==
=== Nationalisation of banking ===
At independence, French-and British-owned banks dominated banking activity in Syria. The largest bank, the French-owned Banque de Syrie et du Liban (Bank of Syria and Lebanon), assumed central-bank functions and became the bank of currency issue, in addition to its commercial operations. In 1947 Syria joined the International Monetary Fund (IMF) and pegged its currency to the U.S. dollar at LS 2.19148 = US$1, a rate that was maintained until 1961.

The Central Bank of Syria commence operations in 1956. It controls credit and commercial banks, controls the money supply, issues notes, and acts as fiscal agent for the government. Also in 1956, as a result of the Suez War, French and British banking interests in Syria were seized as enemy assets. In 1958, and after the union with Egypt, the state began to Arabize the commercial banking system and in 1961 implemented a policy of limited nationalization. In 1966, the government nationalised all remaining commercial banks in Syria, which were merged into a single consolidated Commercial Bank of Syria.

The government created six specialised state-owned banks to promote economic development. The six banks still operate today and are the Central Bank of Syria, Commercial Bank of Syria, Agricultural Co-Operative Bank, Industrial Bank, Popular Credit Bank, and Real Estate Bank. Each bank extends funds to, and takes deposits from a particular sector. Until the 2010s, the Commercial Bank was the only bank in Syria allowed to deal with foreign currency, and was allowed and able to finance foreign trade. The Industrial Bank also is directed more toward the public sector funding, although it is under-capitalized.

=== Reforms since 2000 ===
In the 2000s, Syria started reforms in the financial sector. In 2001, Syria legalized private banks and the sector, while still nascent, has been growing. The old Money and Credit Council and the Central Bank of Syria were reactivated, restoring their role as monetary policymakers and regulators. Foreign banks were given licenses in December 2002, under Law 28 March 2001 which allows the establishment of private and joint-venture banks. Foreigners are allowed up to 49% ownership of a bank, but may not hold a controlling stake. The Damascus Securities Exchange was opened in March 2009.

Syria took gradual steps to loosen controls over foreign exchange. In 2003, the government decriminalized private sector use of foreign currencies, and in 2005 it allowed licensed private banks to sell specific amounts of foreign currency to Syrian citizens under certain circumstances and to the private sector to finance imports. In October 2009, Syria further loosened restrictions on currency transfers by allowing Syrians travelling abroad to withdraw the equivalent of up to US$10,000 from their Syrian pound accounts. In practice, the decision allows local banks to open accounts of a maximum of US$10,000 that their clients can use for their international payment cards. The holders of these accounts can withdraw up to US$10,000 per month while travelling abroad.

To attract investment and to ease access to credit, the government allowed investors in 2007 to receive loans and other credit instruments from foreign banks, and to repay the loans and any accrued interest through local banks using project proceeds. In February 2008, the government permitted investors to receive loans in foreign currencies from local private banks to finance capital investments. The law passed in 2006 permits the operation of private money exchange companies. However, there is still a black market for foreign currency.

In January 2010, there were 13 private banks, including two Islamic banks. In 2018, there were 14 private commercial banks, of which three were Islamic banks.

=== International sanctions ===
The Syrian Central Bank has been subject to U.S. sanctions since May 2004, under Section 311 of the Patriot Act, with the Bank being accused of money laundering. The sanctions shut Syria out of the global financial system. The U.S. sanctions increased the role of Lebanese and European banks because a ban on transactions between US financial institutions and the Syrian Central Bank increased the demand for intermediary sources for US$ transfers. Because of Syrian government actions during the Syrian Civil War, that began in March 2011, Syria has been subject to various sanctions by the U.S., Canada, EU, Arab League and Turkey. U.S. sanctions imposed by the Caesar Act came into effect on 17 June 2020.

To circumvent the sanctions, Syrians effect foreign transactions through banks in neighbouring countries, especially Lebanon, but making them also vulnerable to economic disruptions in those countries. Since the start of the Civil War, and because of international sanctions, there has been movement of funds out of the country to nearby countries.

=== Foreign exchange ===
The government maintains two official exchange rates for the Syria currency, the Syrian pound (LS) — one rate on which the budget and the value of imports, customs, and other official transactions are based, and a second set by the Central Bank of Syria on a daily basis that covers all other financial transactions. An exchange rate of about LS 50 to US$1 was usual in the early 2000s, subject to fluctuations. The pound's official exchange rate has fallen from LS 47 = US$1 before the start of the Syrian Civil War in March 2011 to LS 700 in March 2020 and LS 1,250 in June 2020. The official rate was LS 515 in July 2017, when the peg for the Syrian pound was changed to the IMF SDF (Special Drawing Rights), though the rate tends to be quoted in relation to the US dollar. The official rate on 2 December 2019 was LS 434 = US$1, and LS 471.53 = US$1 on 1 September 2020.

The black market is the only source of foreign currencies for Syrian nationals who want to travel abroad, as well as those attempting to circumvent sanctions by effecting foreign transactions through banks in neighbouring countries or want to hold cash outside the country.

The currency has been devaluing significantly, especially since the start of the Syrian Civil War, and continued to plunge further. On 29 November 2019, following protests in Lebanese, the black market rate was LS 765 = US$1, a decrease of 30% since the turmoil started in Lebanon a month earlier, as the protests led Lebanese banks to impose tight controls on hard currency withdrawals and transfers abroad, making it hard for Syrians to access funds held by them in those banks. The black-market rate fell to LS 950 on 2 December 2019, another 25% decrease, while the official rate was LS 434 = US$1.

On 13 January 2020, the currency deteriorated further, as more than LS 1,000 was traded for US$1 on the black market, while the official rate continued to be LS 434. During the COVID-19 pandemic in Syria, the Syrian pound continued to fall against the U.S. dollar in the black market, where US$1 equaled more than LS 1,600 in May 2020. A month later, the Syrian pound passed LS 2,000 against the dollar, and a few days later, it passed LS 3,000 against the dollar. It settled back to an exchange rate of around LS 2,500 and did not reach LS 3,000 again until early 2021.

In June 2020, anti-government local authorities in Idlib Governorate adopted the Turkish lira in place of the plummeting Syrian pound.

== See also ==
- List of banks in Syria
