= Cham Bank =

Syrian bank

- Type: Public
- Industry: Islamic banking
- Founded: 2006
- Headquarters: Abu Rummaneh, Damascus, Syria
- Area served: Syria
- Key people: Wissam Ibrahim Al-Herz (Chairman); Ahmad Al-Laham (CEO)
- Net income: 409,588,265,156 Syrian pound (2023)
- Total assets: 4,130,550,552,200 Syrian pound (2023)
- Website: www.chambank.com

== About Cham Bank ==
Cham Bank was established as a joint-stock company on September 7, 2006, with a capital of SYP 5 billion, equivalent to USD 100 million at the time. The bank is registered under Commercial Registration No. 14809 and is listed in the Banks Register of the Central Bank of Syria under No. 15.

The bank officially commenced its operations as the first Islamic bank in the Syrian Arab Republic on January 24, 2007. It operates under the supervision and oversight of the Central Bank of Syria, in addition to being subject to the supervision of an independent Sharia Supervisory Board overseeing all of its operations.

The main shareholder in the bank is the Commercial Bank of Kuwait, with a 32% ownership stake, followed by the Islamic Development Bank with a 9% stake, in addition to Mersalkom LLC, which holds a 5% ownership stake

== Banking Services and Activities ==
Cham Bank’s principal activities focus on providing a comprehensive range of innovative Islamic banking services that comply with Sharia principles and address the needs of both individual and corporate customers.

For the retail banking segment, the bank offers a diverse range of solutions, including savings accounts and deposits, safe deposit box services, foreign exchange and currency exchange transactions, money transfers, as well as flexible personal financing programs covering real estate, construction materials, alternative energy solutions, household and electrical goods, medical equipment, travel, education, and healthcare expenses, in addition to revolving credit cards.

For the corporate and business banking segment, the bank provides current and investment accounts, cheque book issuance, documentary credits, collection bills, and letters of guarantee.

These activities are complemented by the bank’s advanced electronic banking services and smart digital channels, most notably the “Najmaty” application and online banking platforms for individuals and businesses. These channels enable customers to manage their accounts and cards instantly and conduct immediate money transfers through the national electronic clearing system (RTGS). The bank also provides instant online account opening services and supports electronic payment solutions for purchases through its “PayMe” service and QR Code technology, in addition to facilitating the payment of bills and government and university fees.

== Board of directors ==
The Board of Directors consists of the following persons:

· Wissam Ibrahim Al-Herz – Chairman of the Board of Directors

· Malek Bakour Haj Ali – Vice Chairman of the Board of Directors

· Eyad Khaled Al-Tabbaa – Board Member

· Osama Taher – Board Member

· Ahmad Nabil Al-Kazbari – Board Member

· Mohammad Abdul Qader Samra – Board Member

== Shariah Committee ==
Beside the Board of Directors, it has the Islamic Committee which supervises and audits the implementation of Islamic activities according to the Quran. The Islamic committee members are approved by the general assembly.

=== Members ===
· Dr. Mohammad Tawfiq Ramadan Al-Bouti – Chairman of the Sharia Supervisory Board

· Mr. Abdul Salam Abdul Monem Mohammadah – Vice Chairman of the Board

· Dr. Abdul Rahman Al-Saadi – Member and Executive Member of the Sharia Supervisory Board

· Dr. Adnan Khodr – Member of the Sharia Supervisory Board

· Dr. Anas Al-Dairshawi – Member of the Sharia Supervisory Board

== Owners ==
The major shareholder of the bank is The Commercial Bank of Kuwait which is the second largest bank in Kuwait.

== Branches ==
The bank has branches in Damascus, Aleppo, Hama, Homs, Latakia, Tartus and Daraa.

== See also ==
- Economy of Syria
- Banking in Syria
- List of banks in Syria
