= Riad Abdul Ra'ouf =

Syrian politician (born 1975)

- رياض عبد الرؤوف

Minister of Finance
- Acting (Note: Appointed in the al-Jalali government; remained in a caretaker capacity after the fall of the Assad regime)
- In office 23 September 2024 – December 2024
- Prime Minister: Muhammad Ghazi al-Jalali; Mohammad al-Bashir
- Preceded by: Kenan Yaghi
- Succeeded by: Mohammed Abazaid

Deputy Minister of Finance for Budget Affairs
- In office 9 June 2024 – 23 September 2024
- Prime Minister: Hussein Arnous
- Minister: Kenan Yaghi

Deputy Minister of Finance for Financial Policies Affairs
- In office 6 December 2021 – 5 June 2024
- Prime Minister: Hussein Arnous
- Minister: Kenan Yaghi

Deputy Minister of Finance for Public Revenue Affairs
- In office 19 June 2018 – 6 December 2021
- Prime Minister: Imad Khamis; Hussein Arnous
- Minister: Maamoun Hamdan; Kenan Yaghi

Personal details
- Born: 1975 (age 50–51) Damascus, Syria
- Party: Independent

Riad Abdul Ra'ouf (Note: Arabic: رياض عبد الرؤوف; born 1975) is a Syrian economist and politician who served as the Minister of Finance.

Coming from an academic background, he is a faculty member at the Faculty of Economics at Damascus University, a member of the Board of Trustees at the Higher Institute of Business Administration, and a Commissioner at the Syrian Securities and Financial Markets Authority.

He holds a PhD in auditing from France (2010), a master's degree in the same field (2005), and a postgraduate diploma from Damascus University (1998). He is fluent in English and French. Abdul Raouf previously chaired the Board of the Syrian Commercial Bank and served as Deputy General Manager of the Syrian Industrial Bank between 2014 and 2016. He was also a member of the steering committee for industrial sector development in Syria and an advisor at the Syrian Securities and Financial Markets Authority. Additionally, he served on the Board of the Insurance Supervision Commission and worked as an expert for the Food and Agriculture Organization (FAO) in Damascus.

== See also ==
- Cabinet of Syria
