= Mohammed Abazaid =

Syrian politician

- محمد أبازيد

Minister of Finance
- In office December 2024 – 29 March 2025
- President: Ahmed al-Sharaa (Note: As de facto leader until 29 January 2025.)
- Prime Minister: Mohammed al-Bashir
- Preceded by: Riad Abdul Ra'ouf
- Succeeded by: Mohammed Yisr Barnieh

Mohammed Abdel Halim Abazaid (Note: Arabic: محمد عبد الحليم أبازيد) is a Syrian politician who served as the minister of finance in the Syrian caretaker government that was formed after the fall of the Assad regime in Syria.

== See also ==
- Cabinet of Syria
