= Syria International Islamic Bank =

Syrian bank

- Native name: بنك سوريا الدولي الإسلامي
- Company type: Public
- Traded as: DSE: SIIB
- ISIN: SY0021100100
- Industry: Banking, Financial services
- Founded: September 15, 2007
- Headquarters: Damascus, Syria
- Area served: Syria
- Key people: Mohamed Hamada (Chairman of the Board of Directors)
- Net income: 46,819,497,227 Syrian pound (2023)
- Total assets: 128,485,096,512 Syrian pound (2023)
- Website: www.siib.sy/en/

The Syria International Islamic Bank (SIIB) (Arabic: بنك سوريا الدولي الإسلامي) is a bank in Syria. It was established in September 2007 and is a Syrian bank the capital of which is held by Qatari and Syrian shareholders. It is a public company that has been listed on Damascus Securities Exchange since June 2009. It was formed as a partnership between the private sectors in the Syria and Qatar. It is located in Damascus, Syria.

== History ==
Due to the Syrian civil war, the European Union and the Arab League froze SIIB's assets and banned SIIB from financial and commercial systems, for acting for or on behalf of the Commercial Bank of Syria (CBS), which had itself been banned, and for providing services to CBS's subsidiary, Syrian Lebanese Commercial Bank. From 2011 to 2012 SIIB facilitated financing worth almost $150 million on behalf of CBS, circumventing sanctions against it.

Financial arrangements that were purportedly made by SIIB were actually made by CBS. In addition to working with CBS to circumvent sanctions, in 2012, SIIB facilitated several substantial payments for the Syrian Lebanese Commercial Bank and facilitated a payment from this designated bank to an entity of proliferation concern.

In August 2011, CBS and its subsidiary, Syrian Lebanese Commercial Bank were subject to U.S. sanctions because of support to entities related to Syrian and North Korean proliferation of weapons of mass destruction. The U.S. government consulted with the Government of Qatar and the Government of Qatar agreed to take corresponding actions.

Because of U.S. sanctions, Yusef Ahmed Al Naama, non-executive member of the Board of Directors from Qatar, resigned. The announcement was on May 31, 2012.
