= Central Bank of Syria =

Coordinates: 33°31′16″N 36°17′46″E

Central Bank of Syria مصرف سورية المركزي

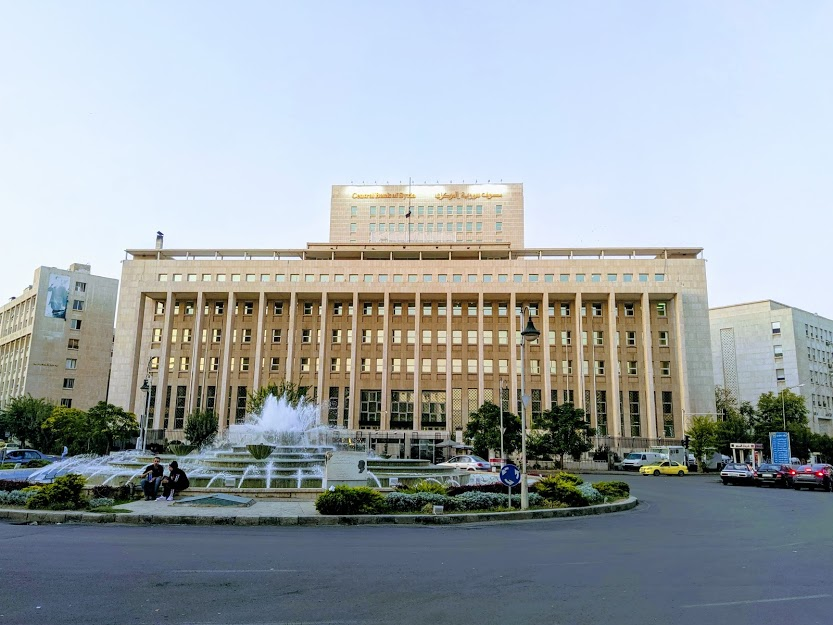
- Central Bank of Syria headquarters on the Sabaa Bahrat Square in Damascus
- Central bank of: Syria
- Headquarters: Damascus
- Established: 28 March 1953; 73 years ago (legal); 1 August 1956; 70 years ago (began operations)
- Ownership: Government of Syria (100%)
- Governor: Mohammed Safwat Raslan
- Key people: Maysaa Sabreen (First-Deputy Governor)
- Currency: Syrian pound SYP (ISO 4217)
- Bank rate: 5%
- Interest on reserves: 6.00%
- Preceded by: Bank of Syria and Lebanon (until 1953)
- Website: cb.gov.sy
- Interactive location map

The Central Bank of Syria (Arabic: مصرف سورية المركزي, romanized: Maṣrif Sūriya al-Markazī; CBS) is the central bank of Syria. The bank was established in 1953 and started operations in 1956. Its headquarters are in Damascus, with 11 branches in the provincial capitals. The objective of the bank is "to foster the stability, integrity and efficiency of the nation’s financial and payment systems so as to promote optimal macro economic performance".

The CBS issues Syria's currency, the Syrian pound (LS), and sets the intervention price in the foreign currency market for the Syrian pound on a daily basis. The CBS exercises control over all banks operating in Syria. Its SWIFT code is CBSYSYDA.

== History ==
After independence, French and British-owned banks dominated banking activity in Syria. The largest bank, the French-owned Banque de Syrie et du Liban (Bank of Syria and Lebanon), assumed central bank functions and became the bank of currency issue, in addition to its commercial operations. Syria joined the International Monetary Fund (IMF) on 10 April 1947 and fixed the exchange rate at £S 2.19 to US$1.

The law to establish the Central Bank of Syria was passed in 1953, but the bank did not operate until 1956. Its functions included issuing notes, controlling the money supply, acting as fiscal agent for the government, and controlling credit and commercial banks. It was also to act as the country's development bank until specialized banks were established for various sectors. The Central Bank had considerable discretionary powers over the banking system but was itself responsible to and under the control of the Council on Money and Credit, a policy group of high-ranking officials.

After the 1956 Suez War, French and British banking interests were seized as enemy assets. In 1958, and after the union with Egypt, the state began to Arabize the commercial banking system and in 1961 implemented a policy of limited nationalization.

In 1966, the state nationalised all commercial banking, merging all existing commercial banks into a single consolidated Commercial Bank of Syria. The government also created specialized banks to promote economic development.

Since the start of the Syrian Civil War, the Central Bank building was attacked three times: in April 2012 a rocket-propelled grenade was fired at the building; in April 2013 it was affected by a car bombing nearby; and in October 2013 it was hit by mortar shells.

=== International sanctions under the Assad regime ===
The United States has imposed sanctions against the then Ba'athist-controlled Central Bank of Syria since May 2004, under Section 311 of the USA PATRIOT Act, with the Bank being accused of money laundering. The sanctions shut the Ba'athist regime out of the global financial system. To circumvent the sanctions, Syrians effect foreign transactions through banks in neighbouring countries, especially Lebanon, but making them vulnerable to economic disruptions in those countries.

Due to the Ba'athist regime's role in the Syrian civil war, the U.S., Canada, EU, Arab League and Turkey have all imposed sanctions on Syria, including the Syrian Central Bank. The Syrian Central Bank has been actively trying to undermine these various sanctions, with bank officials meeting friendly institutions such as Gazprombank executives in Moscow in March 2012. The Bank has taken an increasingly clandestine role in the domestic private sector as the country's failing economy has deterred foreign investment.

On 23 December 2020, the US Department of the Treasury's Office of Foreign Assets Control (OFAC) sanctioned the Central Bank of Syria along with nine other entities and seven individuals, due to their role during the Syrian Civil War.

=== Recent history ===
After the fall of the Assad regime, looters stole some money from the central bank building but that the main vault had remained untouched according to head of the Damascus Chambers of Commerce. Afterwards, the UK and the EU lifted its sanctions against the Central Bank. Canada eased its sanctions as well.

On 30 December 2024, Maysaa Sabreen was appointed as the first female Governor of the Central Bank. She resigned on 27 March 2025, and was succeeded by Abdulkader Husrieh.

On 19 June 2025, Syria completed its first international bank transaction through the SWIFT system since the start of its 14-year civil war. Later that year, on 20 November, the Central Bank of Syria sent its first message via the SWIFT system to the Federal Reserve Bank of New York. Ahmad al-Droubi, the brother-in-law of Ahmed al-Sharaa through his wife, Latifa al-Droubi, was appointed Secretary-General of the Central Bank of Syria.

== Gold reserves ==
In April 2012, Reuters reported that since the outbreak of the Syrian Civil War in 2011, Syria's gold reserves have been cut in half from the pre-civil war level of about $17 billion, with the Syrian government using the reserves to cope with international sanctions. The Governor of the Central Bank Adib Mayalah has sought to deny these reports. This is similar to how the Syrian government is using its foreign reserves to meet the demands of a budget deficit which has greatly increased to about US$6.7 billion.

== List of governors ==
| Name | Tenure |
|---|---|
| Izzat Traboulsi | 1956–1961 |
| Hosni Al Sawaf | 1961–1963 |
| Nourallah Nourallah | 1963–1963 |
| Adnan Al Farra | 1963–1970 |
| Nasouh Al Dakkak | 1971–1978 |
| Rifaat Al Akkad | 1978–1984 |
| Hisham Mutawalli | 1984–1987 |
| Mohammad Al Sharif | 1987–1995 |
| Mohammad Bashar Kabbarah | 1995–2004 |
| Adib Mayaleh | 2005–2016 |
| Duraid Durgam | 2016–2018 |
| Hazem Karfoul | 2018–2021 |
| Mohammed Issam Hazima | 2021–2024 |
| Maysaa Sabreen | 2024–2025 |
| Abdulkader Husrieh | 2025–2026 |
| Mohammed Safwat Raslan | 2026–present |

== See also ==
- List of banks in Syria
- Banking in Syria
- Economy of Syria
- Syrian pound
- List of central banks
- List of financial supervisory authorities by country
