= Mohammed Safwat Raslan =

Syrian economist and policymaker (born 1981)

- محمد صفوت رسلان

Governor of the Central Bank of Syria
- Incumbent
- Assumed office 15 May 2026
- President: Ahmed al-Sharaa
- Preceded by: Abdulkader Husrieh

Personal details
- Born: 1981 (age 44–45) Aleppo, Syria

Mohammed Safwat Raslan (Note: Arabic: محمد صفوت رسلان) is a Syrian economist who became the governor of the Central Bank of Syria in May 2026.

== Education and career ==
Raslan earned a degree in Banking from University of Aleppo in 2002, followed by an executive master's qualification in Business Administration with a specialization in Strategic Management from Łazarski University in 2011.

He had served as Credit Operations Manager at apoBank, after holding a number of positions in German banks and credit institutions. Earlier in his career, he worked as a branch manager at Byblos Bank Syria, Corporate Finance Officer at Syria International Islamic Bank, Senior Accountant at Joud Company, and Head Cashier at the International Bank for Trade and Finance.

On 22 June 2025, Decree No. 117 of 2025 was issued by President Ahmed al-Sharaa, appointing Raslan as Director General of the Syrian Development Fund.

On 15 May 2026, Decree No. 99 of 2026 was issued by President al-Sharaa appointing Raslan as Governor of the Central Bank of Syria.

== See also ==
- Economy of Syria
