= Baghdad Street (Damascus) =

In Damascus, Syria

- Interactive map of Baghdad Street
- Native name: شارع بغداد (Arabic)
- Length: 1.5 km (0.93 mi)
- Location: Damascus, Syria
- Coordinates: 33°31′11″N 36°18′09″E

Baghdad Street (Arabic: شارع بغداد) is a main street in central Damascus, Syria. Located to the north of the old city, the street starts at Sabaa Bahrat Square and ends at Tahrir Square.

== History ==
Baghdad Street was widened in order to accommodate automodible traffic during the French Mandate which the League of Nations imposed after World War I.
