= Sabaa Bahrat Square (Damascus) =

Main square in Damascus, Syria

Coordinates: 33°31′14″N 36°17′45.5″E

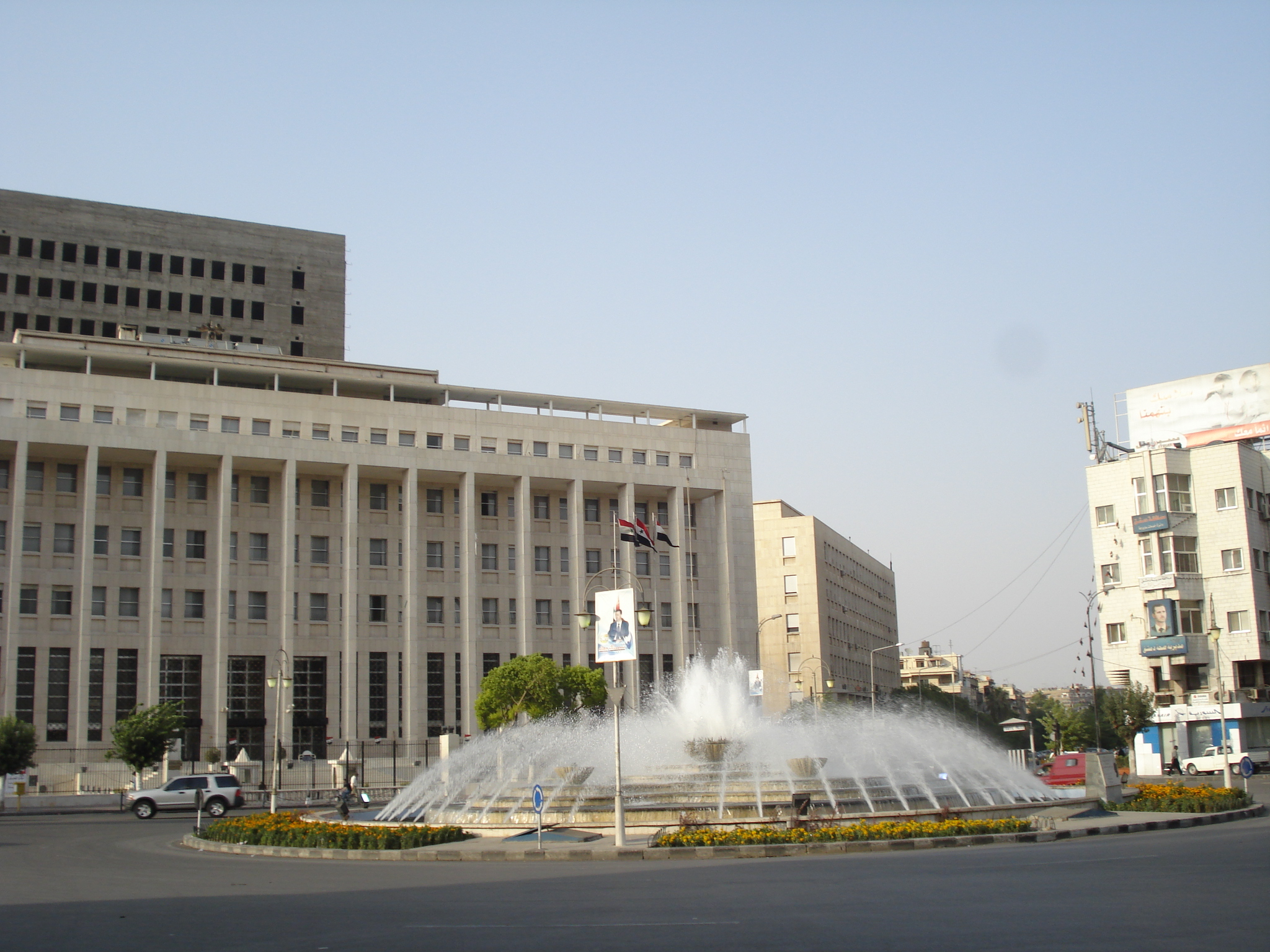
Central Bank of Syria on the Sabaa Bahrat Square

Sabaa Bahrat Square (Arabic: ساحة السبع بحرات, romanized: Sāḥat as-Saba‘a Baḥrāt, lit. 'Seven Fountains Square') is a large and important square in Damascus, Syria. Many important official buildings and ministries are located in the area including the Central Bank of Syria. Many important streets branch from there including Baghdad Street.

== History ==
It was first erected by French mandate authorities in 1925 in memory of a French captain called Gaston Descarpentries. The square had a small dome with seven fountains, and was called "Captain Decarpentry Square. In 1938 Baira's mosque was built by Rashid Baira."

After the independence of Syria the authorities removed the monument and renamed the square. During the Syrian civil war against the government of President Bashar al-Assad machine-gun fire was reported in nearby Sabaa in the square, which was the scene of several major pro-government demonstrations.
