= Hmisho Trading Group =

- Industry: General trading
- Founded: 1988; 38 years ago
- Headquarters: Latakia, Syria.
- Key people: Ramez Hmeicho (Chairman)
- Number of employees: nearly 500

Hmisho Trading Group is a group of companies engaged in heavy metal industries, international trade, car marketing, and providing after-sales services.

== Subsidiaries ==
The subsidiary companies of the group include Hmisho Steel S.A., a manufacturer of rolled steel bars for construction; Hmisho Trading Company, an importer of cars; and Gulf Company, which provides after-sale services.

=== Hmisho Steel S.A ===
Hmisho Steel S.A. operates a roll mill plant for the production of deformed reinforced iron bars, long iron bars, and wire coils. The plant was built with the aid of the European Union. Its annual production capacity is 500,000 units.

The company markets its products in Syria, Iraq, Europe, and the Persian Gulf.

=== Hmisho Trading Company ===
Hmisho Trading Company is the exclusive distributor for several international car manufacturing companies, including Saipa Group, Kerman Motors, First Automobile Works, Changhe Automobile Import and Export LTD, and Eicher Motors. They are also involved in a passenger car assembly plant located in Homs Governorate in partnership with the Iranian Saipa Corporation, known as Syrian-Iranian Vehicle Company International (SIVECO). Together, they produce approximately 20,000 cars annually.

Hmisho Trading imported approximately 25,000 cars annually from China and Iran, and were ranked first in the marketing and sale of cars in Syria in 2004, 2005 and 2006. They have 50 car carriers for use in the import and export of cars.

=== Gulf Company ===
Gulf Company operates multiple car maintenance and repair centers throughout Syria. They also operate several warehouses for storage of spare parts and equipment for repairs and maintenance.

== Company expansion ==
In 2007, Hmisho Trading Group announced that they were planning a new combined wire rod and bar mill for the production of low and medium carbon content rebars. Production was expected to begin in 2007, and the mill was projected to have a capacity of approximately 300,000 metric tons per year.
