= Mohammed Yisr Barnieh =

Syrian economist and policymaker

- محمد يسر برنية
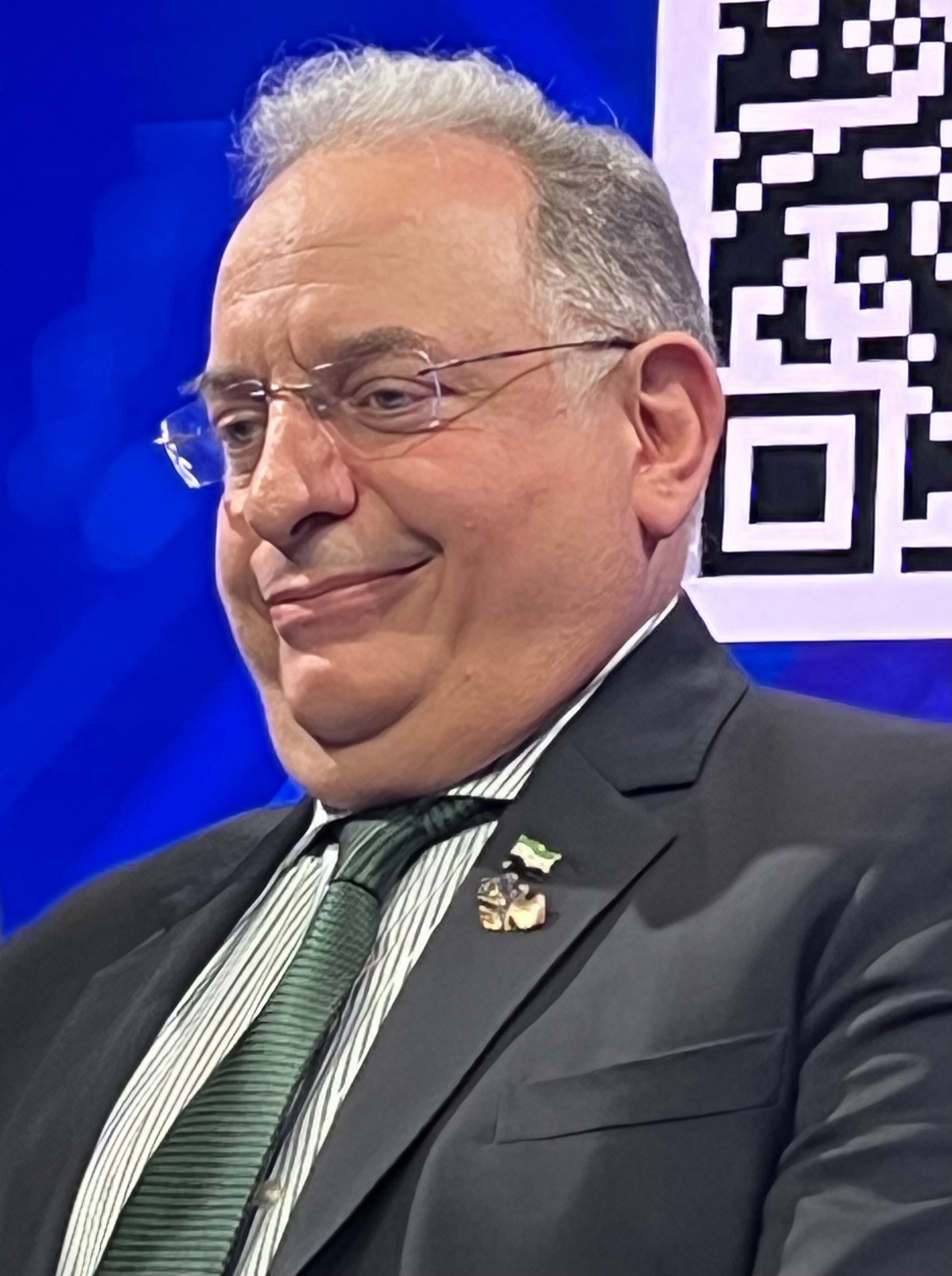
- Barnieh in 2025

Minister of Finance
- Incumbent
- Assumed office 29 March 2025
- President: Ahmed al-Sharaa
- Preceded by: Mohammed Abazaid

Syria's Governor of the World Bank
- Incumbent
- Assumed office 2 June 2025
- Preceded by: Unknown

Mohammed Yisr Barnieh (Note: Also transliterated as Mohammad Yasser Barnieh.) (Arabic: محمد يسر برنية) is a Syrian economist and policymaker serving as Minister of Finance in the Syrian transitional government since 29 March 2025. He previously held senior positions in international financial institutions and played a key role in shaping Syria's financial markets.

== Education ==
Barnieh earned a bachelor's degree in economics from Damascus University in 1990. He then pursued graduate studies in economics at the University of Kansas, the University of Washington, and Oklahoma State University between 1990 and 1994.

== Career ==
Barnieh began his professional career in 1996 as a trainee at the Federal Reserve Bank of New York. Later that year, he joined the Arab Monetary Fund as an economist, where he steadily rose through the ranks, eventually serving as head of financial markets.

Between 2004 and 2007, Barniyeh played a role in establishing the Syrian Commission on Financial Markets and Securities and the Damascus Securities Exchange, contributing to the development of Syria’s financial sector by strengthening its regulatory and institutional framework.

From 2009 to 2024, he held various positions within the Arab Monetary Fund, culminating in his role as director of the Economic Policy Department. In this capacity, he oversaw economic research and advised Arab governments on financial reforms.

=== Appointment as the Syrian Minister of Finance ===
On 29 March 2025, Barnieh was appointed minister of finance in the Syrian transitional government.

==== Policy priorities ====
Upon taking office, Barnieh outlined key priorities for financial reform, including:

- Digitizing government transactions to improve efficiency and transparency.
- Strengthening collaboration with civil society organizations.
- Enhancing public-private partnerships to stimulate economic growth.
- Reviewing and restructuring public debt strategies.

These initiatives aim to stabilize Syria’s financial system and support long-term economic development.
