= Sporulenol synthase =

Identifiers
- EC no.: 4.2.1.137

Databases
- IntEnz: IntEnz view
- BRENDA: BRENDA entry
- ExPASy: NiceZyme view
- KEGG: KEGG entry
- MetaCyc: metabolic pathway
- PRIAM: profile
- PDB structures: RCSB PDB PDBe PDBsum
Search
- PMC: articles
- PubMed: articles
- NCBI: proteins

Sporulenol synthase (EC 4.2.1.137, sqhC (gene)) is an enzyme with systematic name tetraprenyl-β-curcumene—sporulenol cyclase. This enzyme catalyses the following chemical reaction

sporulenol $\rightleftharpoons$ tetraprenyl-β-curcumene + H_{2}O

The reaction occurs in the reverse direction.
