= Syrian-Qatari Holding Company =

The Syrian-Qatari Holding Company (SQHC) is a holding company founded in 2008 and based in Damascus that is equally owned by the governments of Syria and Qatar. With a declared capital of USD 5 billion it is Syria's largest holding company. The company has invested or plans to invest, among others, in power generation, agriculture, dairy and juice manufacturing, phosphate fertilizers, health care, real estate, financial services and fuel distribution. In October 2009 it signed a Memorandum of Understanding with the Syrian Ministry of Housing and Construction to invest in wastewater treatment. Qatar’s shares are held by Qatar Investment Authority.
