= Commercial Bank of Syria =

Banking entity in Syria (1966–present)

Coordinates: 33°30′58″N 36°17′40″E

- Native name: المصرف التجاري السوري
- Company type: Public
- Industry: Banking, Financial services
- Founded: 1967
- Headquarters: Youssef Al-Azmeh Square, Damascus, Syria
- Area served: Syria and abroad
- Key people: Muhammad Murtada (Chairman), D. Dergham (CEO)
- Products: Credit cards, consumer banking, corporate banking, finance and insurance, investment banking, mortgage loans, private banking, private equity, savings, Securities, asset management, wealth management
- Net income: ▲US$ 4.7 billion (2017)
- Owner: Government of Syria (100%)
- Number of employees: 4000
- Subsidiaries: SLCB
- Website: www.cbs-bank.sy

The Commercial Bank of Syria (Arabic: المصرف التجاري السوري) is a fully government owned bank in Syria. It is the largest commercial bank in Syria with its headquarters in Damascus. The Commercial Bank accounts for the highest assets share in the banking sector, amounting to 37% of all bank assets at the end of 2017.

The bank offers commercial banking services including long-term loans in Syrian pounds, armored car service, and collections services. The bank has dozens of branches and ATM's throughout Syria.

== History ==
In 1966, the state achieved complete ownership of commercial banking in Syria by merging all existing commercial banks into a single consolidated Commercial Bank of Syria. In 1974, the Commercial Bank incorporated in Lebanon the Syrian-Lebanese Commercial Bank, in which it owns 85%. Until the 2010s, the Commercial Bank was the only bank in Syria allowed to deal with foreign currency, and allowed and able to finance foreign trade.

Following the outbreak of the Syrian Civil War, in August 2011, the Office of Foreign Assets Control of the U.S Department of the Treasury designated the bank as Specially Designated Nationals. OFAC designated the bank and its Lebanese subsidiary under the authority of Executive Order 13382 (signed on June 29, 2005), which is aimed at "disrupting the activities of weapons of mass destruction proliferators and their sources of support". It banned U.S. banks and their overseas subsidiaries from maintaining a correspondent account with the Commercial Bank of Syria and required them to conduct due diligence that ensured that the Commercial Bank of Syria was not circumventing sanctions through their business dealings with them. The European Union also imposed sanctions on the bank in October 2011 with its assets frozen.

== See also ==
- Banque de Syrie et du Liban
