= Damascus Securities Exchange =

Syrian stock exchange

- سوق دمشق للأوراق المالية
- Type: Stock Exchange
- Location: Damascus, Syria
- Founded: 2009
- Owner: Damascus Securities Exchange
- Key people: Mohammad Ghassan Al-Qalla'a (Chairman); Salim Challah (Deputy Chairman); Abdul Razak Kasem (CEO)
- Currency: Syrian pound
- No. of listings: 37 as of October 2024
- Indices: DWX
- Website: www.dse.sy

The Damascus Securities Exchange (DSE) (Arabic: سوق دمشق للأوراق المالية, romanized: Sūq Dimashq lil-'Awrāq al-Māliyyah) is a stock exchange located in Damascus, Syria. Founded in 2009, it is the only stock exchange in Syria. The Damascus Securities Exchange is a member of the Federation of Euro-Asian Stock Exchanges.

It started with its premises in the Barzeh district. On 10 May 2022, it moved to the business district of Yaafour.

== History ==
=== Decree No. (55) (Securities Market Law) ===
On 1 October 2006, Syrian President Bashar al-Assad issued Decree No. (55) (Securities Market Law) ("the Decree"), providing for the establishment of a stock market in Syria. The market was to be known as the DSE. This decree stipulated that the market be self-financed, provided that it covers Government deficits. The Decree also provides for the opportunity to convert the market into a joint stock company.

The DSE was to be run by a board of directors consisting of 9 members. The Prime Minister was to appoint these members based on recommendations provided by the Syrian Commission on Financial Market & Securities.

=== Official opening ===
The first official trades on the DSE were launched on 10 March 2009.

=== Syrian war ===
According to the International Monetary Fund (IMF), between March 2011 when the uprising began, and May 2012, the value of the Syrian pound had fallen 45 percent and the Damascus stock exchange decreased 40 percent.

=== Damascus Securities Exchange closing and reopening (December 2024 - June 2025) ===
On 8 December 2024, the Assad regime collapsed during a major offensive by opposition forces. The stock exchange was closed during the days leading up to the collapse. On 2 June 2025, the stock exchange reopened following a six-month closure. Syrian Finance Minister Mohammed Yisr Barnieh attended the reopening of the market and noted that the exchange “will operate as a private company and serve as a genuine hub for Syria’s economic development, with a strong focus on digital,” The move to reopen the market also comes as international restrictions on Syria's financial systems begin to ease in light of the United States and European nations announcing the lifting of sanctions that were applied to the system under the al-Assad dynasty’s rule.

== See also ==
- Economy of Syria
- List of stock exchanges
