= Izzat (given name) =

- Pronunciation: Arabic: [ˈʕɪz.zat, ˈʕez.zæt]
- Gender: Male
- Language: Arabic

Origin
- Meaning: 'Might', 'Glory', 'Honor', 'Majesty', 'Power', 'Vanity'
- Region of origin: Arabia

Other names
- Alternative spelling: Ezzat, Azzat, Izat, Aizat
- Variant forms: Izzet, Izet, Гыйззәт, Ғиззәт, Ğizzät

Izzat is an Arabic male given name. Notable people with that name include:

== Given name ==
- Izzat Artykov (born 1993), Kyrgyz weightlifter
- Izzat Dajani, Jordanian banker
- Izzat Darwaza (1888–1984), Palestinian politician and historian
- Izzat Dzulkeple (born 1982), Malaysian lawn bowler
- Izzat Ghazzawi (1951–2003), Palestinian writer
- Izzat Husrieh (1914–1975), Syrian journalist
- Izzat Hussain, Indian television chef
- Izzat Hyat-Khan (1929–2002), Pakistani ambassador
- Izzat Ibrahim al-Douri (1942–2020), Iraqi military commander
- Izzat M. Idriss (born 1935), Syrian-American geotechnical engineer
- Izzat Javaid Khan, Pakistani politician
- Izzat Klychev (1923–2006), People's Artist of the USSR, incumbent member of the Academy of Arts of the USSR and honorary corresponding member of the Russian Academy of Arts
- Izzat al-Nuss (1912–1976), Syrian politician
- Izzat Tannous (1896–1993), Palestinian physician and politician
- Izzat Traboulsi (1913–2000), Syrian politician
- Izzat Yousef Al-Maqrif (born 1952), Libyan political prisoner
- Izzat Zikri (born 2001), Malaysian footballer

== See also ==
- Izet, a Bosnian name
- Izzat (disambiguation)
- Izzet, a Turkish name
