= Ezzat (disambiguation) =

Ezzat (Arabic: عزت, lit. 'pride and emotional strength') may refer to:

== Places ==
- Ezzat, village in Mazandaran province, Iran
- Ezzat ol Din, village in Mazandaran province, Iran
- Ezzat-e Pain, village in Razavi Khorasan province, Iran
- Manshiyat Ezzat village in Dakahlia Governorate, Egypt

== People ==
=== Given name ===
- Ezzat Abou Aouf (1948–2019), also known as Mohamed Ezzat Ahmed Shafiq Abou Aouf, Egyptian actor and composer
- Ezzat Ebrahim-Nejad (1975–1999), Iranian student, poet and demonstrator who was shot and killed
- Ezzat ed-Dowleh (c. 1835–1905), Qajar Iranian princess, daughter of Mohammad Shah Qajar and Malek Jahan Khanom
- Ezzat El Alaili (1934–2021), Egyptian actor
- Ezzat el Kamhawi (born 1961), Egyptian novelist and journalist
- Ezzat Ghoniem, Egyptian lawyer and human rights activist
- Ezzat Goushegir, Iranian fiction writer and playwright
- Ezzat Jadoua (born 1983), Qatari football midfielder
- Ezzat Janmaleki, also known as Ezatollah Janmaleki, Iranian football defender
- Ezzat Negahban (1926–2009), Iranian archeologist
- Ezzat Rouhbakhsh (1908–1989), Iranian singer

=== Middle name ===
- Aziz Ezzat Pasha (1869–1961), Egyptian politician
- Youhannes Ezzat Zakaria Badir (1949–2015), Egyptian Coptic Catholic bishop

=== Surname ===
- Heba Raouf Ezzat (born 1965), Egyptian academic, writer and activist
- Khalifa Ezzat, Chief Imam, and Islamic scholar
- Laila Ezzat (born 1935), Egyptian painter
- Mahmoud Ezzat (disambiguation), several people
- Samah Abu Bakr Ezzat, Egyptian children's book author

== Other uses ==
- Manshiyat Ezzat Palette, schist cosmetic palette from predynastic Egypt

== See also ==
- Izzat (disambiguation)
