= Izzat (disambiguation) =

Izzat is the concept of honor in North India, Bangladesh and Pakistan.

Izzat may also refer to:

- Izzat (given name), including a list of people with the name
- Izzat (1937 film), an Indian Hindi-language drama film by Franz Osten, starting Ashok Kumar and Devika Rani
- Izzat (1960 film), a Pakistani film
- Izzat (1968 film), an Indian Hindi-language drama film by T. Prakash Rao, starring Dharmendra and Tanuja
- Izzat (1991 film), an Indian Hindi-language action film by Ashok Gaikwad, starring Jackie Shroff and Sangeeta Bijlani
- Izzat (2005 film), a 2005 Norwegian film

== See also ==
- Ezzat (disambiguation)
- Izzet, a Turkish name
- Izet, a Bosnian name
