= Mohamed Messaoud Chebbi =

Mohamed Messaoud Chebbi (Tunisian Arabic: محمد مسعود الشابي) is a Tunisian Arab nationalist intellectual and political activist.

When the Baath Party in Tunisia passed through a split in 1966, Chebbi belonged to the faction that supported the historical leadership of Michel Aflaq. In the 1970s he emerged as the leader of the Baathist group Organization of Tunisian Democrats - al-Hurriah, based in exile.
