= Izzat =

Cultural concept in the Indian subcontinent

Izzat (Urdu: عزت, romanized: 'izzat, lit. 'honour') is a concept of prestige, dignity, and social respect. The word ultimately derives from the Arabic ʿizza/ʿizzah meaning honor, might, or dignity, and became widely used in South Asian languages, particularly through Persian and Urdu. It applies universally across religions, communities, and genders, Broadly speaking, izzat primarily refers to the reputation of oneself and one's family in the eyes of society. Maintaining this societal reputation by all necessary means is considered obligatory upon every man and woman, as is revenge or punishment upon those who have or are perceived as having directly or indirectly violated it.

The concept of izzat has been viewed as curtailing the freedom and rights of women, yet characterized on a general level as a concept that cuts across social hierarchy and enforces "equality in giving, but also equality in vengeance." The idea of reciprocity, in both friendship and enmity, is deeply embedded in izzat. It is required, for example, that a person goes to any lengths to come to the assistance of those who had previously helped them in their time of need, and to fail to do so is to dishonor one's debt and thereby lose izzat. Critics of Izzat often reference izzat as a tool to avoid assimilation and as a form of violence against women.

== Etymology ==
Izzat, derived from Arabic, has Proto-Semitic origins, with cognates found in Hebrew, Aramaic, Syriac, Akkadian and Ugaritic. The cognate עוז appears in the Book of Exodus (15:2), "The Lord is my strength ('oz) and my song", with honour tied to divine worship and ethics. Further cognates additionally appear in the early Christian period.

The word is widely used in Islamic literature, such as Qur'an 63:8, "But all honour (`izzah) belongs to Allah, His Messenger and the believers". As a result, variants of the word are commonly found as a male given name in Arabic and Turkish. Following the Muslim conquest of Persia, Arabic was absorbed into courtly and literary use. Through the Delhi Sultanate and Mughal Empire, Persian spread to the Indian subcontinent, with izzat entering into use in Urdu, Hindi, Bengali and Punjabi.

In Pakistan and Bangladesh, izzat is deeply embedded in daily language and social codes. In the comparatively mercantile south, with less influence of the Mughal Empire, the word is less common, with social codes tied to mercantile trust and religious patronage, rather than feudal prestige.

Izzat entered the English lexicon through British imperial exposure in India, in a similar manner to now common words such as pajamas, veranda, bungalow and loot.

Themes of Izzat can be found in the words of writers such as Rudyard Kipling in exploring the social dynamics of honour, dignity and social standing. For example, in "William the Conqueror - II", the fatalist Faiz Ullah objects to milking a goat to aid in famine relief, stating that it is beneath him; against his izzat. The task is then taken on by the British officer Scott. For Scott's pragmatism over fatalism, he earns the mocking sobriquet "Bakri Scott".

Well, that settles it. He'll be Bakri Scott to the end of his days.

— Rudyard Kipling, William the Conqueror - II

== Violations, enmity, and revenge ==
Violations or perceived violations of izzat are key to the development of both personal and family enmities (dushmani, दुश्मनी/دشمنی, দুশমনি) as the wronged party seeks revenge (badla, बदला/بدلہ, বদলা), which could result in cycles of counter-revenge, sometimes spanning generations. The concept of reciprocity applies to badla as well. The nature and intensity of the revenge, "and what is taken—life, resources, or position—is governed by izzat (honour), which is the principle of reciprocity or equivalence in all things." Because social relations in the region emphasize social debts and "unrestricted reciprocity" among kin, enmity can spread to individuals who were not involved in the original infractions of izzat and "rarely remains localized."

== Internationally ==
Among the South Asian diaspora, the concept has taken on new expressions, having adapted to new environments. Research on the Pakistani community in Newcastle upon Tyne found izzat remained an important form of social prestige. In Canada, research among immigrant Punjabi women has described it influencing as behaviour in both family and public life. In Britain, research has similarly examined how izzat can shape the experiences of British Asian girls with the justice system. Studies of women from South Asian backgrounds in the United Kingdom have identified notions of honor and shame as factors in expectations surrounding marriage, including some experiences of forced marriage. Some scholars have cautioned against viewing izzat as solely relating to violence or oppression.

== See also ==
- Face (sociological concept)
- Honour killing
- Namus
- Pashtunwali
