= Izzet =

İzzet (or Izzet) is a Turkish masculine given name and a surname. It comes from the Arabic ʿIzzat (عزت), which means things like "might", "glory", "honor", "power". Notable people with the name include:

== Given name ==
- İzzet Günay (born 1934), Turkish film actor
- İzzet Türkyılmaz (born 1990), Turkish basketball player
- Ahmed İzzet Pasha (1864–1937), Grand vizier of the Ottoman Empire.
- Izzat Husrieh (1914–1975), Syrian journalist, author, publisher and researcher
- Izzat Traboulsi (1913–2000), Syrian politician, economist, banker, and writer

== Surname ==
- Mustafa Kemal "Muzzy" Izzet (born 1974), English footballer
- Kemal Izzet (born 1980), English footballer

== See also ==
- Izet (Bosnian given name)
- Izzat (given name) (Arabic given name)
- Izzet League, a Magic: The Gathering faction from Ravnica
