= On the Way of Resurrection =

1947 book by Michel Aflaq

- Author: Michel Aflaq
- Original title: فِي سَبِيلِ البعث
- Language: Arabic
- Subject: Ba'athism
- Genre: Political theory
- Publication date: 1947

On the Way of Resurrection (Arabic: فِي سَبِيلِ البعث, Fī-Sabīl al-Baʿth) is a political literature book written by Michel Aflaq, one of the founders of Ba'athism. It is a five-volume work that is one of the founding documents of Ba'athism that described the ideology.
