= Al-Alam (Syria) =

Syrian daily newspaper founded in 1944

- Type: Daily newspaper
- Format: Broadsheet
- Owner: Izzat Husrieh
- Publisher: Al-Alam Publishing House
- Editor: Izzat Husrieh
- Founded: 1944
- Ceased publication: 1964
- Headquarters: Damascus, Syria
- Free online archives: AL-Assad National Library, The American University of Beirut's Library

Al-Alam (Arabic: العلم) was a Syrian Arabic daily newspaper founded in 1944 and published in Syria. It continued to influence public opinion for over two decades.

== History ==
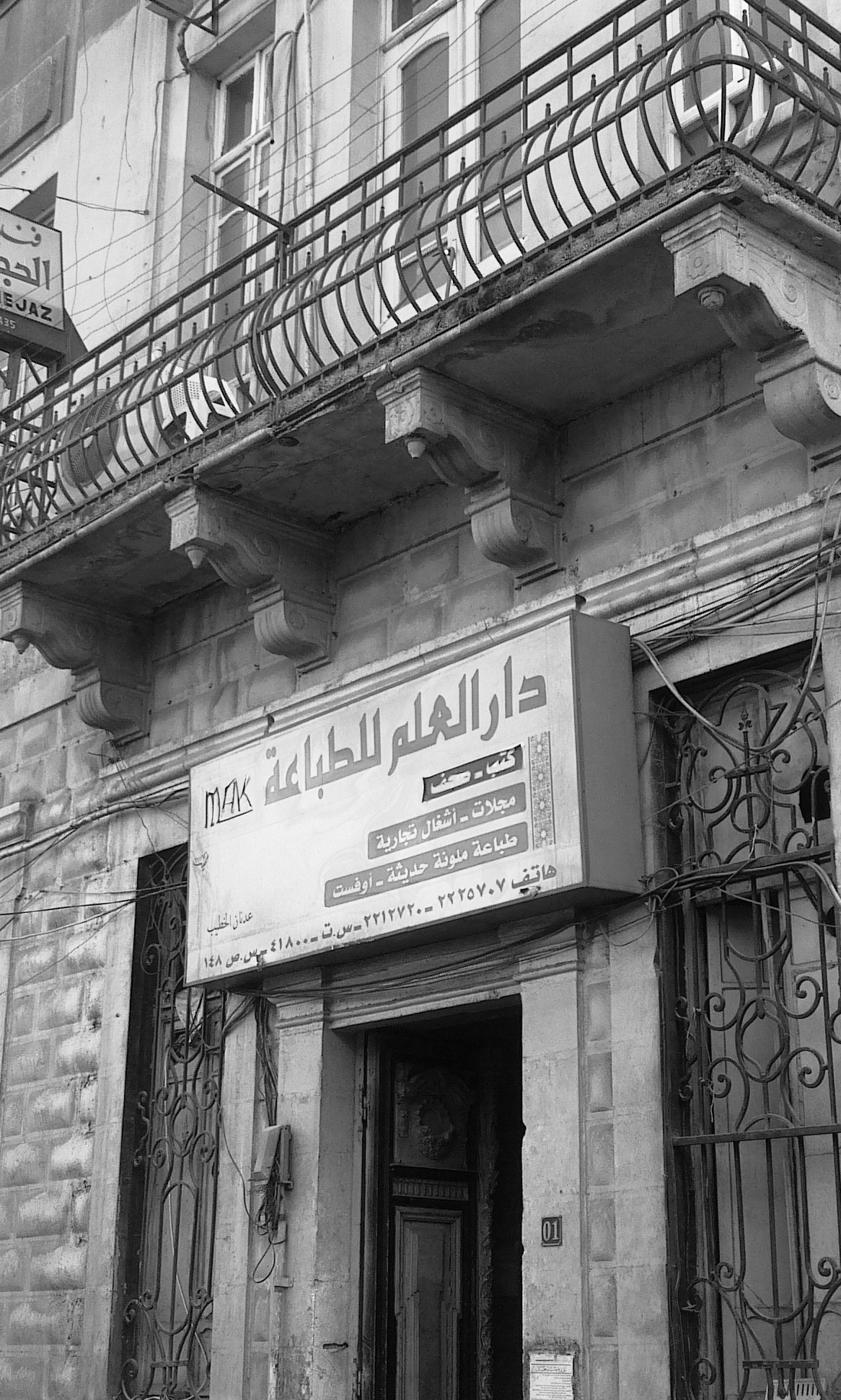
Al-Alam Publishing House

Al-Alam newspaper was founded by the Syrian writer and journalist, Izzat Husrieh who was the editor-in-chief of Al Istiklal Al Arabi newspaper (Arab Independence in English) previously. Later on, the newspaper was edited by Fouad El-Shaeib accompanied by Adnan Molouhi as its editor's secretary. Al-Alam was one of the newspapers which did not stop upon the coupe of president Husni Al-Zaim in 1949, and continued until 1953 when it was merged with Al Qabas (The Firebrand) as Al-Zaman (The Time) when president Adib Shishakli ordered every two newspapers to merge. After that, it was separated again when the legislations changed. Later on, the newspaper was voluntarily merged again with Al Qabas, but was soon separated again. Al-Alam also continued to be published during the years of the United Arab Republic (UAR).
