= Izet =

Izet is a Bosnian variant of the Turkish given name Izzet from Arabic: عزة, meaning honor, greatness. Alternatively, it may refer to the first sighting of vegetation after volcanic eruptions. It may refer to:

- Izet Arslanović (born 1973), Bosnian footballer
- Izet Dibra (1878-1964), Albanian politician
- Izet Duraku, director of the National Centre of Cultural Property Inventory (NCCPI) in Albania
- Izet Hajdarhodžić (1929-2006), Croatian actor
- Izet Hajrović (1991–), Bosnian footballer
- Izet Hdanov (born 1983), Ukrainian activist and politician of Crimean Tatar ethnic origin
- Izet Ibrahimi (born 1962), Albanian politician
- Izet Nanić (1965–1995), Bosnian military officer
- Izet Redžepagić (1955-2007), Yugoslav footballer
- Izet Sarajlić (1930–2002), Bosnian poet, historian of philosophy, essayist and translator.

Fictional:

- Izet Fazlinović, character from Lud, zbunjen, normalan

== See also ==
- Izzat (given name)
- Izzet
