= Samah Abu Bakr Ezzat =

Egyptian children's author

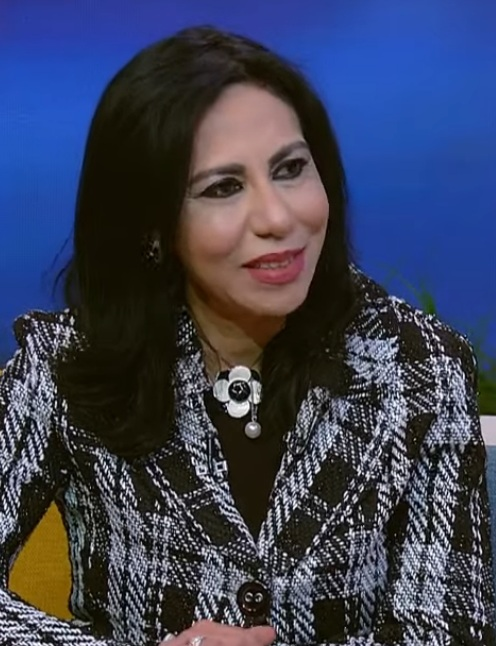
- Samah Abu Bakr Ezzat, guest of channel1eg, 4 February 2022
- Occupation: Author
- Parents: Abu Bakr Ezzat (father); Kawthar Hekal (mother)

Samah Abu Bakr Ezzat (Arabic: سماح أبو بكر عزت) is an Egyptian author who specialises in children's literature. She has held many writing workshops for children within Egypt and other countries. She has received several awards, both domestic and international.

== Personal life ==
Samah is the daughter of the late Egyptian actor Abu Bakr Ezzat, and her mother was the late author Kawthar Hekal.

== Works ==
Samah wrote over 40 books in the field of children's literature, and they ranged from fiction to historical books. Her works include:

- :"The Confused Circle" (original title: Al-Da’era al-Ha’ira), 2020
- "The Face of the Moon" (original title: Wajh al-Qamar), 2020
- "Marwa and the Friends of the Sea" (original title: Marwa wa Asdika al-Bahr), 2020
- "A Forest Between the Waves" (original title: Ghabat’un Bayn al-Amwaj), 2020
- "A Pearl in the Sky" (original title: Lo’lo’at’un fi al-Sam’a), 2020
- "Ali and his smart friend" (original title: A’li wa Sadiquh al-Zaki), 2019
- "The Secret of the Yellow Hat" (original title: Sir al-Quba’a al-Safra’), 2019
- "Alone in the Box" (original title: Wahdi fi al-Sanduq), 2017
- "Things in the Life of Scholars" (original title: Ashya’ fi Hayat al-’Olmaa), 2017
- “Hamada the Maker of Happiness” (original title: Hamada San’i al-Sa’ada), 2017
- "A Letter to my Friend Omar" (original title: Resala ila Sadiqi ‘Omar). 2017
- "The Story of Black and White" (original title: Hikayet el-A’byad we el-A’swad), 2017
- "Jamila and the Three Sisters" (original title: Jamila wa al-Shaqiqat al-Thalath), 2016
- "The Secret of the Blue Sea" (original title: Sir al-Bahr al-Azraq), 2016
- "The Amazing Game" (original title: Al-L’oba al-Mudhisha), 2015
- "Thirty Books and a Book" (original title: Thlathon Kitab’an wa Kitab), 2014
- "Orchard of Justice" (original title: Bustan al-’Adala), 2014
- "The Cheapest of Treasures" (original title: A’rkhas al-Kunuz), 2014
- "The Fox and the Sly Rabbit" (original title: Al-Ta'lab wa al-A'rnab al-Mohtal)
- “The Mountain’s Gift” (original title: Hadiyat al-Jabal), 2014
- "A Whinny of Gold" (original title: Sahel Min Dhahab), 2014
- "The Accused is a Mouse" (original title: Al-Motaham Fa’r), 2014
- "Hassan's Horse" (original title: Hissan Hassan), 2013
- "A Mouse in Tamer’s House" (original title: Fa’r fi Bayt Tamer), 2013
- "A Castle and a Temple in my Pocket" (original title: Fi Jaybi Qal’at’un wa M’abad), 2011
- "Once Upon a Time: The story Begins” (original title: Tota Tota Badai’t el-Hadota), 2010
- "Silent Giving" (original title: Al-’Ataa al-Samit), 2007
- "The Secret of the Red Sky" (original title: Sir al-Sam’a al-Hamr’a)
- “The Golden House” (original title: Al-Bayt al-Zahabi)
- "Spring's Crown" (original title: Taj Al-Rabi’)
- “The Coward’s Road” (original title: Josor al-Jaban)
- “Suns” (original title: Shomos)
- “Dream Horse” (original title: Jawad al-Hulum)
- “Habiba and the Bag’s Secret” (original title: Habiba wa sir al-Haqiba)
- “Things” (original title: ‘Ashy’a)
- “The Green Bird’s Journey” (original title: Rihalt al-A’sfoor al-Akhdar)
- “Hadeel”

== Awards ==
Samah Abu Bakr Ezzat earned many Arabic and international prizes in the field of children's literature and creative writing, including:

- The Golden Award in the field of screenwriting from the Arab Creativity Festival for the TV series “Aladdin and the treasure of Grandfather Amin”
- The International Council on Books for Young People award in Switzerland for her story "The Confused Circle", 2020
- The Khalifa Educational Award for her story the "Orchard of Justice".
