= Izet Redžepagić =

Yugoslav footballer (1955–2007)

Personal information
- Date of birth: 27 September 1955
- Place of birth: SFR Yugoslavia
- Date of death: 16 May 2007 (aged 51)
- Place of death: Croatia
- Position: Forward

Senior career*
Years	Team	Apps	(Gls)
1976–1982	Borac Banja Luka	127	(15)
1982–1986	Osijek	60	(12)
1986–1987	Dardanelspor	22	(3)
Total		209	(30)
- * Club domestic league appearances and goals

Izet Redžepagić (27 September 1955 – 16 May 2007) was a footballer who played in the former Yugoslavia and Turkey.

== Club career ==
Born in Yugoslavia, Redžepagić started playing football for local side FK Borac Banja Luka in the Yugoslav First League. He would also join fellow First League side NK Osijek.

In 1986, Redžepagić moved to Turkey, joining Süper Lig side Dardanelspor for one seasons. He made 22 leagues appearances for the club.

== Personal life ==
Redžepagić died from a long illness in 2007.
