= Izzat Traboulsi =

Izzat Traboulsi عزة الطرابلسي

Minister of Economy and Foreign Trade
- In office 17 September 1962 – 8 March 1963
- Preceded by: George Khoury
- Succeeded by: Abdul Karim Zuhour

Governor of the Central Bank of Syria
- In office 1956–1961
- Preceded by: None
- Succeeded by: Hosni al-Sawaf

Personal details
- Born: 20 November 1913 Damascus, Syria
- Died: 6 December 2000 (aged 87) Beirut, Lebanon
- Party: Independent

Izzat Traboulsi (20 November 1913 – 6 December 2000) (Arabic: عزة الطرابلسي; alternate spelling: Ezzat Traboulsi, عزت الطرابلسي), was a Syrian politician, economist, banker, and writer. He was the first governor of the Central Bank of Syria from 1956 to 1961 and served as Minister of Economy and Trade under the government of Head-of-State Nazim al-Qudsi and Syrian Prime Minister Khalid Al-Azm in 1962. His ideas and actions had an important influence on the Syrian financial institutions.

== Education ==
Izzat Traboulsi earned his Baccalauréat diploma at the age of 16, and traveled to Lebanon to pursue a medical degree. He began his university career at the Saint Joseph University in Beirut, studying medicine. His interest in Law, however, overcame him and, after completing two months at Saint Joseph, returned to Damascus to study Law at the University of Damascus. After practicing law for a short period, in around 1939, he participated in and won a government-funded competition which enabled him to travel to Paris with a scholarship to study at the Sorbonne University, where he obtained a PhD in Economics. As the Second World War began, he stayed in Paris until 1945 completing his PhD and studying Political Science; he was shortly imprisoned during the war, possibly for his affiliation with co-founding the Arab Student Association in Paris along with Fawzi Al-Qawuqji, Omar Hakim, and Hafez Ibrahim of Tunisia. Upon completing his studies, he returned to Syria to teach at the Damascus University, and assumed a judicial post in Damascus.

== Political career ==
Izzat Traboulsi quickly ascended in his professional career: In 1947, he became the Director of the Syrian Ministry of Finance. On both 19 June 1947 and 23 August 1947, he attended the United Nations Economic and Social Council on behalf of Syria. In 1950, he became the director of the Latakia Port, and one year later appointed Director of Customs becoming an aide to the Minister of Finance. In 1956, Izzat Traboulsi composed the financial structure of Syria and thus became the first Governor of the Central Bank. His signature appears on Syrian bills between the years of 1956 and 1961.

In his post as Governor of the Central Bank, he was determined to re-establish Syria's industrial sector passing laws that favored free markets; including one which the ownership of factories and the nationalized property were to be returned to their original proprietors, and those proprietors also to be compensated for their loss during those years of acquisition by the United Arab Republic. Traboulsi’s accomplishment could be attributed to Syria’s 80% GDP expansion in the 1960s reaching a peak of 336% of total growth during the 1970s.

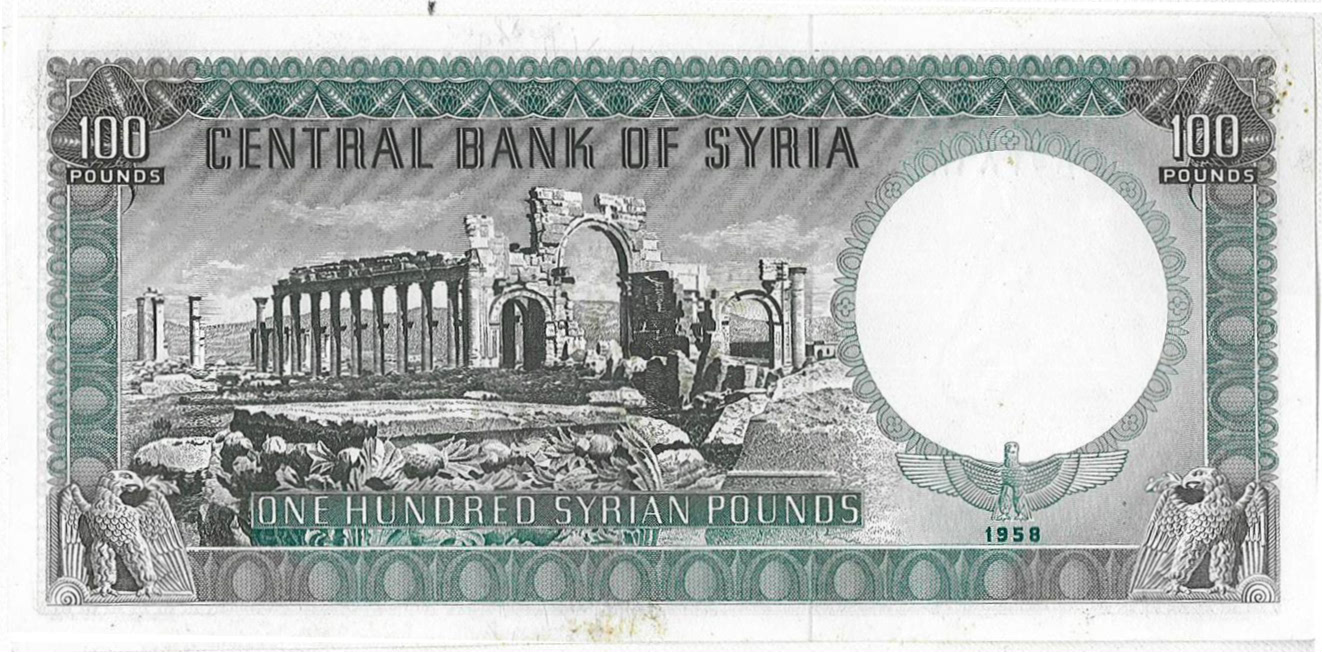
English

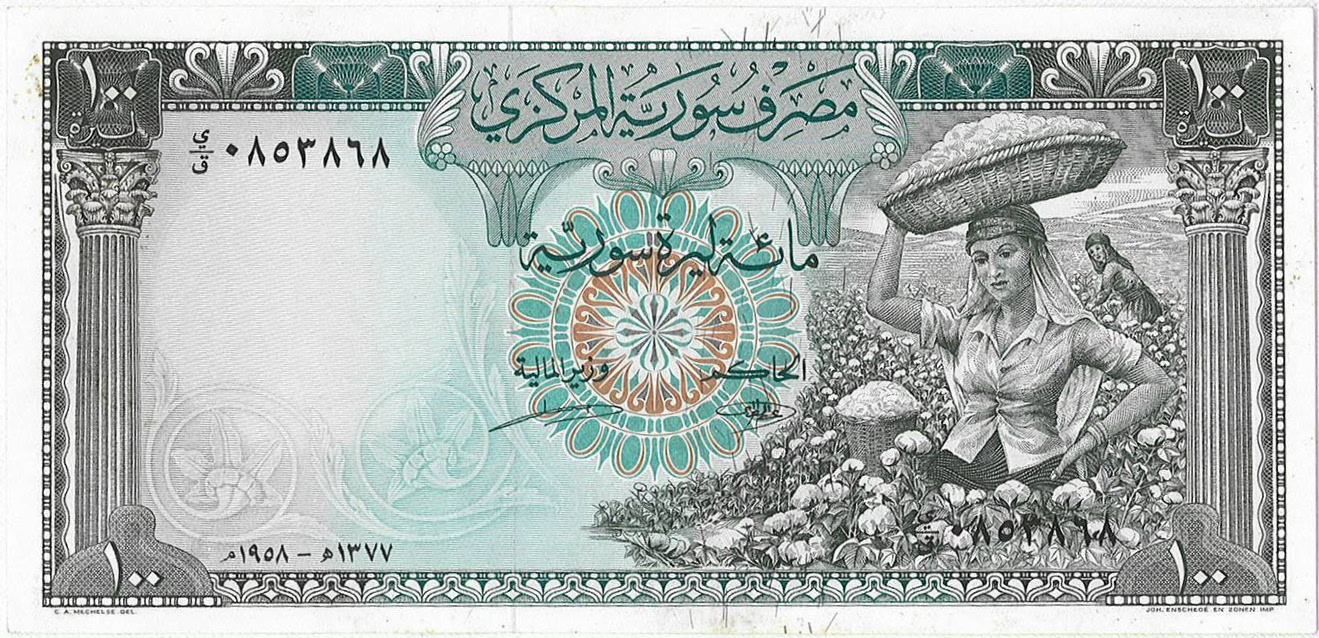
Arabic : Dr. Traboulsi's signature is shown on the right

Izzat Traboulsi resigned from the Syrian Central Bank at the end of January 1961, allegedly in protest against Cairo's refusal to free Syrian assets frozen in Egypt. (Jaridah, Feb 5 1961). Traboulsi was said to have warned Abd al-Mun'im Qaysuni, UAR Minister of Economy, of the economic strain the union was imposing on Syria, and the danger to the union itself –should the plans for nationalization and currency unification be carried out. (BAPP, Feb 3 1961) Traboulsi was described as "the businessman's hope and disciple of free economy" and his resignation a sign of impending currency control. (Economist, Feb 18 1961)

On October 8, 1961, it was announced that the cabinet had formed a 13-man committee on economic and financial reform under the chairmanship of Izzat Traboulsi. The committee was to tender its recommendations to the union within one month. (R. Damascus, Oct 8 1961; Jaridah. Oct 10, 14 1961)

At the same time Awad Barakat, the Syrian Minister of Economy, said that the government favored Traboulsi's endorsement of free trade and fair competition, however, the parliament would have to deal with the question of whether nationalization should be repealed.

Although supporting Gamal Abdel Nasser, Traboulsi left Syria on the recommendation of Abdel Hamid Sarraj on account of his opposition for currency-unification. After the United Arab Republic collapsed as a result of a coup d'état in the same year, 1961, Traboulsi was denied the right to return in Syria.

On 2 April 1962, a counter coup placed Nazim al-Kudsi Head-of-State and Khalid al-Azm Prime Minister – who opposed the union with Egypt arguing that Nasser would destroy Syria's democratic system and free market economy. Traboulsi returned to Syria as Minister of Finance.

Al-Kudsi and Al-Azm, allied with former president Shukri al-Quwatli, attempted to purge pro-Nasserist elements that were still permeating within the Syrian government, and reverse the austere program of nationalization instituted by Nasser.

However, before this could be achieved, the Arab Socialist Resurrection Party (Baath Party) came to power on March 8, 1963 reinstating the socialist system, dependent on Abdel Nasser's model in Egypt and both al-Azm and al-Qudsi fled into exile, thereby isolating Traboulsi from his homeland. Traboulsi thus settled in Beirut for the remaining of his life.

Izzat Traboulsi became "one of the most prominent political and economic figures in Syria" while occupying the post of Minister of Economy and Trade during the politically turbulent time between the post-UAR period and Baath Party administration, forming Syria's financial structure.

== Banking career ==
After 1963, Traboulsi was aid to King Faisal of Saudi Arabia, who was credited with rescuing the country's finances and implementing a policy of modernization and reform; accordingly, Traboulsi was granted a Saudi passport until around 1971. In the late 1960s, Izzat Traboulsi lived in Kuwait for around two years. Later, in around 1972, he composed the financial structure of the Central Bank of the United Arab Emirates at the request of Sheikh Zayed bin Sultan Al Nahyan.

In 1973, Izzat Traboulsi became the Banque Nationale de Paris Intercontinentale, BNPI, representative of the Middle East; a post he assumed for almost ten year, mainly from Paris as he left Lebanon due to the civil war in 1975.

In 1987, Traboulsi was appointed General Manager of BLOM Bank in Beirut, Lebanon and remained in this post until he resigned in 1997, when he was appointed Chairman and Board adviser until his death in 2000.

== Published work ==
“L'agriculture syrienne entre les deux guerres” [Agriculture in Syria between the two wars] published in Beirut, 1948.

“Studies of public finances”, in conjunction with former Syrian Minister Awad Al-Barakat, which includes Traboulsi’s political and economic development in Syria.

== See also ==
- Nasim Al Safarjalani
