= Izzat Dajani =

Jordanian banker

- Born: Izzat Rashed Al-Dajani; Amman, Jordan
- Occupations: Banker and executive officer.

Izzat Dajani (Arabic: عزت دجاني) is a Jordanian banker and executive officer. He served as the chairman and CEO of Citibank in Qatar and is one of the founding members of the Royal Pharmaceutical Society of GB. He also is the co-founder and CEO of IMCapital Partners, and executive vice chairman of Capital Compass.

== Background ==
Dajani was born in Amman. He received his bachelor's degree from Liverpool School of Pharmacy in UK (now known as Liverpool John Moores University), graduated from Harvard Kennedy School with a master's degree in public administration and completed the executive management program at Stanford University Graduate School of Business. In 2003, Dajani was assigned by Saud bin Saqr Al Qasimi to establish the Investment & Development Office (IDO) of the Government of Ras Al Khaimah, where he served as the CEO. He was also a member of the founders' committee and CEO of RAK Petroleum and the chairman of the board of trustees of RAK Properties. In 2007, Dajani joined Goldman Sachs in Dubai as head of key clients in the investment management division. In 2011, Dajani was appointed chairman and CEO of Citibank in Qatar. He also has served as a board member of Jordan Ahli Bank and Alternatif Bank in Turkey.
