= Nasim al-Safarjalani =

Syrian politician (1935–1994)

Nasim Al Safarjalani
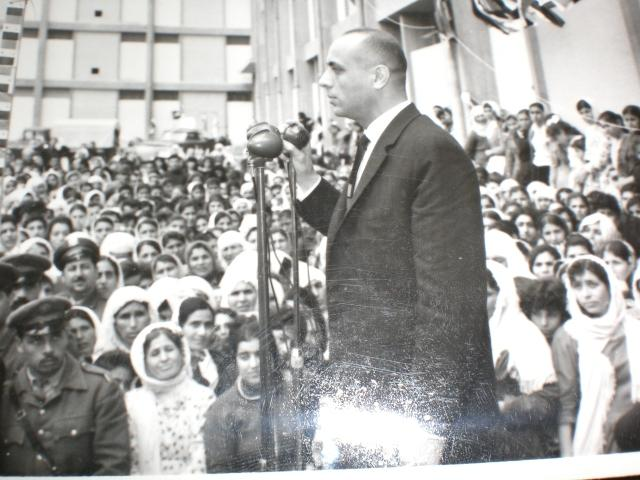
- Safarjalani in a public speech to the people of Syria
- Born: 1935
- Died: 1994 (aged 58–59)

Philosophical work
- Era: General Secretary of the Presidential Council and Governor of Latakia Province
- Region: Syrian Politician

Nasim Al Safarjalani (1935–1994) (in Arabic نسيم السفرجلاني) comes from a prominent Arab Syrian family (Al Safarjalani) from Damascus, Syria. He is best known for being a governor of Latakia, and later was overthrown out of his post by the Ba'athist c'oup d'état of 1966.

== Origins and youth ==
Historian Salah ad-Din Al Safarjalani records that Nasim Al Safarjalani was born in Damascus in 1935, the son of a reasonably well-off Arab Army Officer. His family and many of his recent ancestors had been ulama and preachers in the district's Umayyad Mosque. Al Safarjalani thus grew up in a conservative family atmosphere, and attended an early education at the Tajhiz al-Ula where Salah ad-Din al-Bitar was his teacher with Michel Aflaq, both founders of the Arab Ba'ath Party in the early 1940s. He was also exposed to the political vicissitudes of the time, as his father Asaf Al Safarjalani (in Arabic آصف السفرجلاني) had a leading role in the Great Syrian Revolution of 1925 against the French, who were then the mandatory power in Syria.

== Early political activity ==
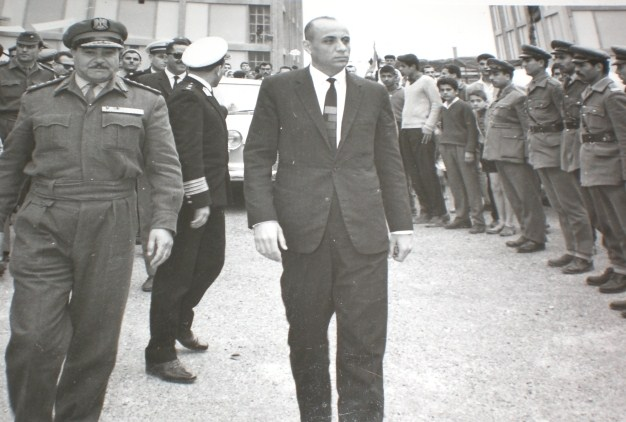
Nasim Al Safarjalani in Latakia, Syria

A distinguished attorney at young age, Al Safarjalani was on a path to a prominent public life and a rising figure in the Syrian political arena. Quickly he was recognized and admired among his peers and was named for several government posts, among them, General Secretary of the Presidential Council and Governor of Latakia Province.

Nasim Al Safarjalani became the youngest ever Syrian Governor in the modern history of Syria. He held his post as Governor of Latakia at age 28. His performance was spectacular. To this date, the people of Latakia Province regard Al Safarjalani as the most distinguished Governor of Latakia Province since independence.

== Downfall, exile and death ==
On 23 February 1966 a bloody coup d'état led by leftist Ba'athist faction headed by Chief of Staff Salah Jadid, overthrew the Syrian Government. A late warning telegram of the coup d'état was sent from President Gamal Abdel Nasser to Nasim Al Safarjalani (The General Secretary of Presidential Council), on the early morning of the coup d'état. The coup sprung out of factional rivalry between Jadid's "regionalist" (qutri) camp of the Ba'ath Party, which promoted ambitions for a Greater Syria and the more traditionally pan-Arab, in power faction, called the "nationalist" (qawmi) faction. Jadid's supporters were also seen as more radically left-wing. Al Safarjalani was sentenced to death in absentia by a special military court headed by later Syrian Defence Minister, Mustafa Tlass, and Interim Syrian President and Vice President of Syria Abdul Halim Khaddam, as prosecutor. Al Safarjalani managed to make his escape and flee to Beirut. In 1969 another court condemned Al Safarjalani to death in absentia. He was never pardoned even when President Hafez al-Assad came to power. A return to Damascus was never reconciled and an agreement was never reached with al-Assad. He was also rumored to be in contact with Syrian opposition figures in Baghdad.

At the age of 31, Nasim Al Safarjalani was forced into exile. Several of Al Safarjalani's colleagues were assassinated (Salah ad-Din al-Bitar, Muhammad Umran), hence Al Safarjalani fled from one country to another. Members of the party's other fractions fled; Michel Aflaq was captured and detained, along with other members of the party's historic leadership. When the new rulers launched a purge in August that year, Al Safarjalani and Malek Bashour, Aflaq's close trusted friends and colleagues, managed to help Aflaq make his escape, and hence Aflaq was able to flee to Beirut.

A few months later, Al Safarjalani escaped through Al Zabadani mountain area in Syria to Lebanon. A journey described as a three day on foot struggle. Al Safarjalani was never able to return to his country. In 1994 Al Safarjalani died in exile.

As an Arab politician he set an example to the people of Syria and to the Arab world to the nature of political life in Modern Syria and several other Arab states.

== Notes ==
- Akram al-Hawrani, http://www.jablah.com/modules/news/article.php?storyid=2265
- Shibli al-Aysami, http://www.alrasidalarabi.com/10-2006/Madi17.htm
- Shibli al-Aysami, http://www.alrasidalarabi.com/Madi1.htm
- Dandashli pp. 340–341
- Dandashli pp. 365–366
- Mohammad Farouk Moneer, https://www.sandroses.com/abbs/t68721/
- http://alhiwaradimocraty.free.fr/3-06-08-1.htm
- http://www.ahewar.org/debat/show.art.asp?aid=67611

== Sources ==
- Asad: the struggle for the Middle East, Patrick Seale, University of California Press, Berkeley, 1990. ISBN 0-520-06976-5
- The Old Social Classes and New Revolutionary Movements of Iraq, Hanna Batatu, al-Saqi Books, London, 2000. ISBN 0-86356-520-4
