= Izzat Yousef Al-Maqrif =

Izzat Yousef Al-Maqrif (Arabic: عزت يوسف المقريف) is a prominent Libyan political prisoner who was born in Benghazi, Libya in 1952, formerly a senior member of the NFSL (the National Front for the Salvation of Libya). During a stay in Egypt, on the evening of March 12, 1990, Izzat Yousef Al-Maqrif was taken for routine questioning, and hasn't been seen since. Izzat is the brother of former Libyan Head of State Mohammed Magariaf.

== Disappearance ==
On March 5, 1990, agents from the Egyptian State Security Investigation Bureau arrived to Izzat's home in Heliopolis, Cairo to question him about the activities of NFSL, a dissident group opposing Gaddafi's dictatorial rule. After interrogating him at the headquarters of the State Security Investigation Bureau, his passport was confiscated and they asked for a meeting for the following week.

On the evening of March 12th, 1990, Colonel Mohamed Hassan from the Egyptian State Security Investigation Bureau asked Izzat to accompany him again for further questioning. Izzat was never seen again by his family.

== Proof of Kidnapping ==
Izzat’s family recently obtained letters with Izzat’s distinct handwriting detailing his kidnapping. The details include the name of the people involved in the kidnapping in Egyptian Intelligence as well as the names of the people that interrogated him in Libya. Although the letter was written just a couple of years after he was kidnapped, the family only received it in September 2009. Details of the letter corroborate US Intelligence reports. Two former prisoners of Abu Salim prison have come up recently and are willing to testify that they saw Izzat Yousef Al-Maqrif imprisoned in Abu Salim Prison. They even know the full names and nicknames of the guards who were guarding Izzat Al-Maqrif and the exact prison cell that he was in during his stay in Abu Salim Prison in Tripoli.

This case has been adopted and supported by the Mayor of Englewood, New Jersey, Mr. Michael Wildes, who fought to keep Mr. Gaddafi out of Englewood in the 2009 United Nations General Assembly conference.

== UNHRC ==
In November 2010, TRIAL International, a human-rights focused NGO submitted a communication to the United Nations Human Rights Council on behalf of Izzat's son, Youcif Almegaryaf regarding Izzat's disappearance.

On March 31, 2014, the United Nations Human Rights Council issued a decision stating that Libya has breached numerous articles of the International Covenant on Civil and Political Rights in relation to the disappearance of Izzat Al-Maqrif and the treatment of his family.

The UNHRC urged the Libyan government to undertake the following measures:

-Conduct independent investigations as a matter of urgency with a view to locating Izzat Al-Maqrif and, in the event of his death, exhuming, identifying, respecting and returning his mortal remains to his family;

-Fully investigate the circumstances of the alleged violations and take all appropriate steps to bring to justice and sanction those responsible before the competent civilian authorities;

-Adopt all necessary measures to ensure that Izzat Al-Maqrif’s family receive integral reparation and prompt, fair and adequate compensation. Reparations shall include measures aiming at granting restitution; rehabilitation; satisfaction, including restoration of dignity and reputation; and guarantees of non-repetition.

Libyan has still not fulfilled its obligation as a signatory of the International Covenant on Civil and Political Rights.
