= Khalifa Ezzat =

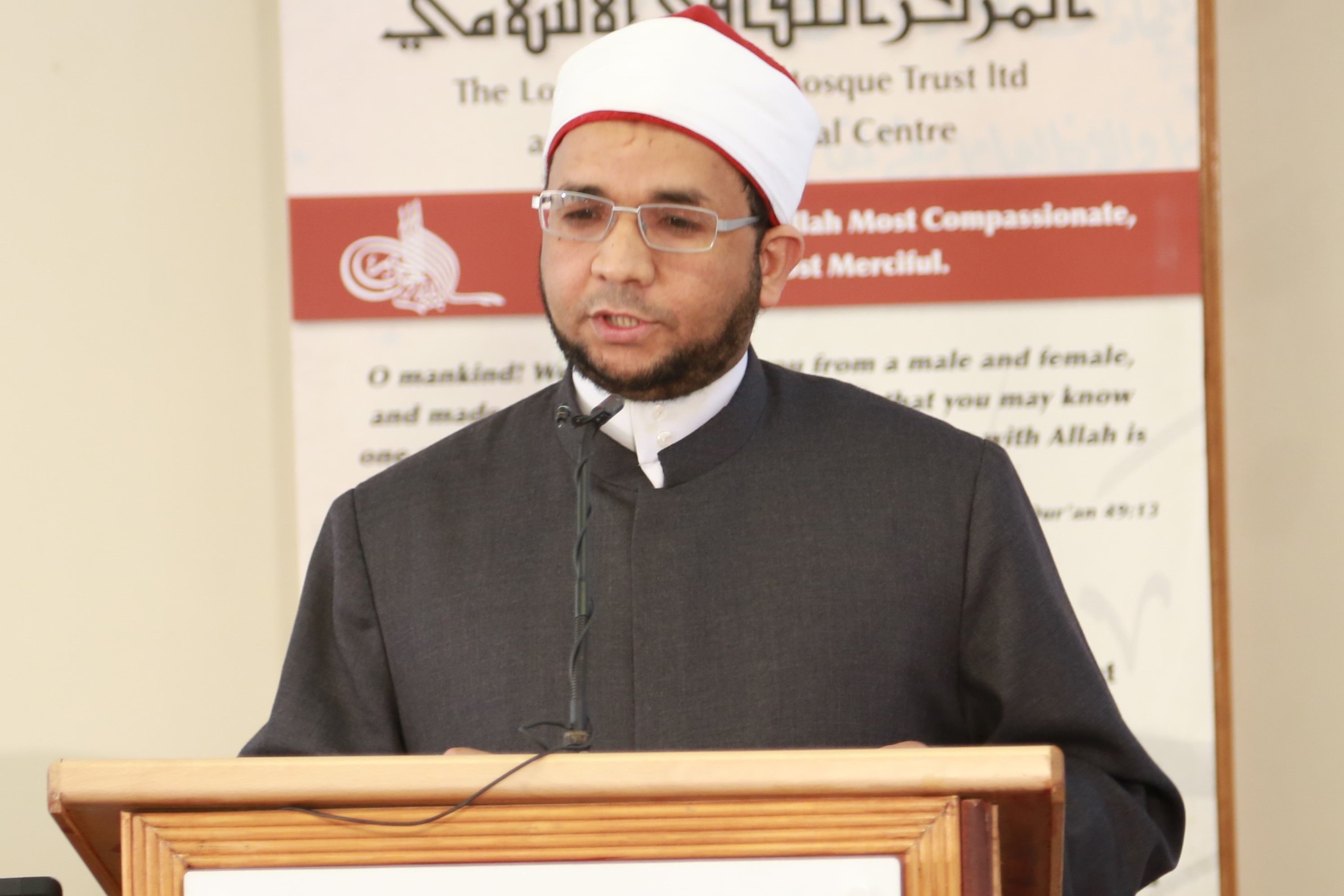
- Education: Islamic Studies
- Alma mater: BA Al-Azhar University; School of Oriental and African Studies, University of London PhD University of Exeter
- Occupations: Chief Imam and researcher

Khalifa Ezzat was born in upper Egypt where he first received his Islamic education in the Al Azhar Institute. Khalifa completed the memorisation of the Qur'an, at early age. As part of, his prep and secondary school at Al-Azhar in Al Fashn; his early academic life, predominately composed of learning major traditional Islamic doctrines, including, Tafsir, Hadith, Arabic language, Shariah/Fiqh, and Theology. After successfully completing his secondary education, he was nominated and enrolled in Al Azhar University in Cairo to complete his Islamic education.

== Education ==
Khalifa studied at one of the oldest Islamic Institutions in the world, Al Azhar University, Cairo. He was awarded a BA Islamic Studies in English. As part of his degree programme, he also studied English and German. After this, he pursued his career as an Imam in Cairo in 2000. When he moved to the United Kingdom in 2005, he completed his master's degree in Islamic studies at the School of African and Oriental Studies (SOAS), where he received his MA Islamic Studies. Khalifa was also awarded a PhD from the University of Exeter: his thesis title was People of the Book, An Analytical Study of Jews and Christians in the Qur'an.

== Chief Imam at London Central Mosque ==
In 2005, Khalifa was nominated by the Egyptian Ministry of Endowments (Awqaf) to be appointed as an Imam of London Central Mosque and Islamic Cultural Centre; in 2008, he was appointed as the Head Imam of the Mosque. In his current role as Imam, he leads the faithful Muslims in congregational prayer, delivers Friday sermons, gives lectures and lessons for Muslims and Non-Muslims, and manages the religious affairs department at the London Cultural Centre. His main weekly class is the Islamic Studies Class for Beginners (Muslims and non-Muslims). In addition, Khalifa provides an advice service, that includes marital and one to one counselling, marriage, divorce and conversion registrations.

== Services ==
For the past decade, Khalifa has provided community service to many visitors at London Central Mosque. He has a successful track record of mediating between married couples and delivering effective counselling. In addition to Islamic marriage (Nikkah), divorce (Talaq), and conversion procedures, he offers registrations, with certificates both in English and Arabic. He also provides an advisory service on personal religious matters, which includes: inheritance, conversion, social and familial issues. The listed services are available to all members of the British and International community.

Khalifa also supports the newly converted to Islam and born Muslims seeking to renew their faith. He delivers regular easy to understand Islamic classes.

He covers a variety of topics in Islam, such as Introduction to the Concept of God, the Qur'an, Hadith (Muhammad Sayings), Life of Muhammad (in Makkah), Life of Muhammad (in Madina), Sunnah (Muhammad Way), the Exegesis of the Qur'an (Tafsir), Fiqh (Jurisprudence), the Shariah Islamic Law, The Objectives of the Shariah, Introduction to School of Thoughts (Abu Hanifa- Malik- Shafi - Ibn Hanbal), Marriage in Islam, Terrorism: Islamic Viewpoint, Extremism in Religion, The Concept of Worship, Sins and Repentance in Islam, Introduction to Tawheed (Monotheism).

== Friday sermons ==
The Friday Speech is considered one of the special features of the Friday prayer. Khalifa takes a contemporary and practical approach in the Friday sermons. The topics which he has covered thus far, include issues which effect the Muslim's on both an individual and communal level. The Friday sermons also, serve as important reminders for the congregation, of the Muslim's duty to their Creator and responsibility towards others. The Mosque, attracts many crowds and is a perfect opportunity for the Imam's to address the mass on contemporary issues. The speech, attended by thousands men and women), is delivered in Arabic and English.

The objective of the speeches is to encourage people to engage in activities that bring benefit to themselves and others and to avoid all that God has ordained to be avoided, to remember and glorify God alone as the Creator of all, to follow the example of Muhammad, to tackle current issues that affect the Muslim community, to inform and highlight to the people the importance of peace, coexistence, tolerance, and respecting the law of the land that they are living in.

The following are links to these sermons in written and recorded format.

LCM welcomes other Muslim faith leaders to download and use Khalifa's Friday sermon speeches in their own congregation.

== Conferences and seminars ==
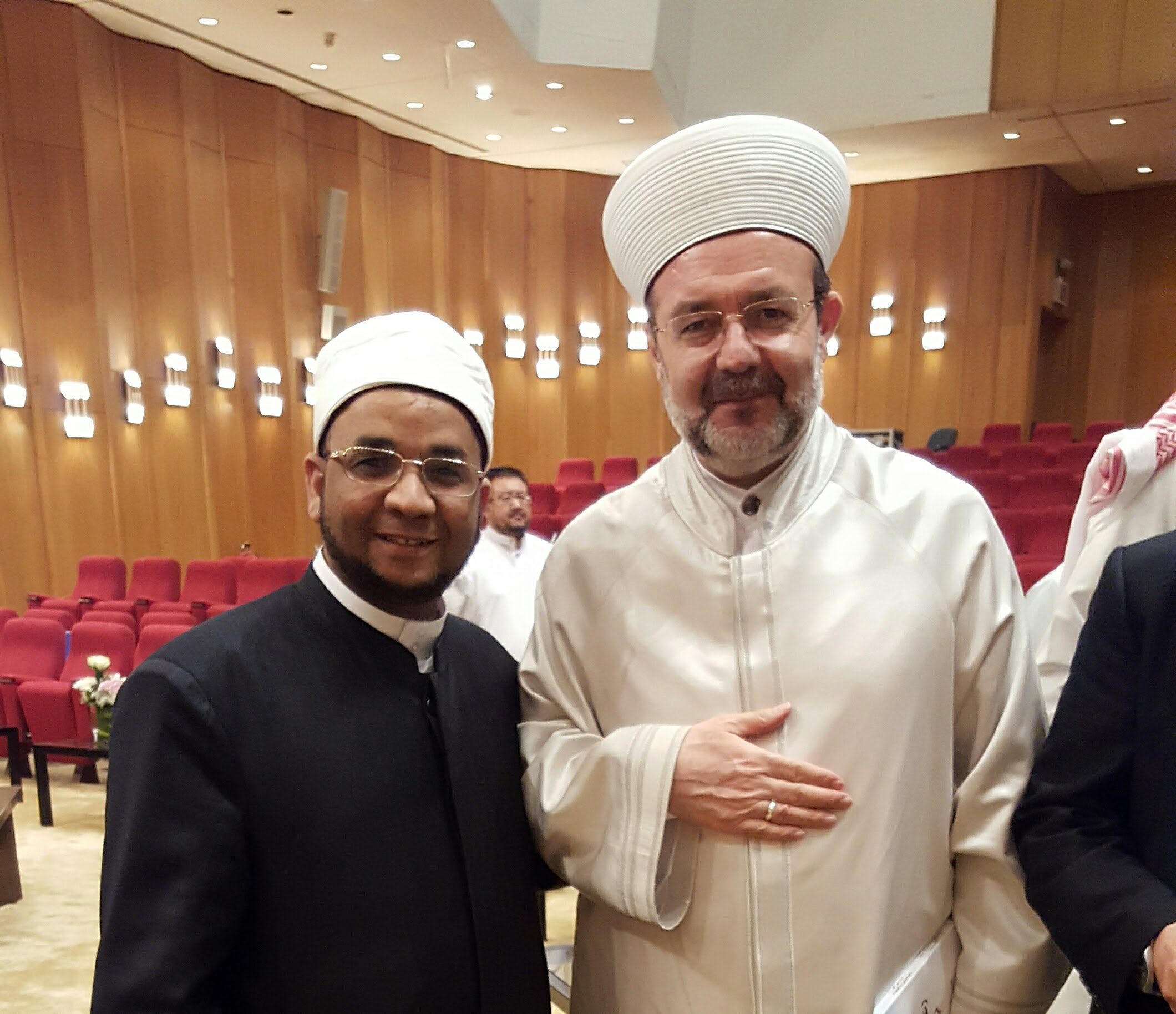
Khalifa with the Turkish Minister of Religious Affairs

Khalifa participates in many conferences and seminars, for Da'wah and shedding light on Islam. In a recent event, he led an initiative to encourage non-Muslims to visit London Central Mosque, which included members of the Abrahamic faith.

As well as addressing issues closer to the Muslim community, his participation as an active member, to promote unity, and shielding against extremism, has made him a valuable asset to this cause.

== Interfaith activities ==
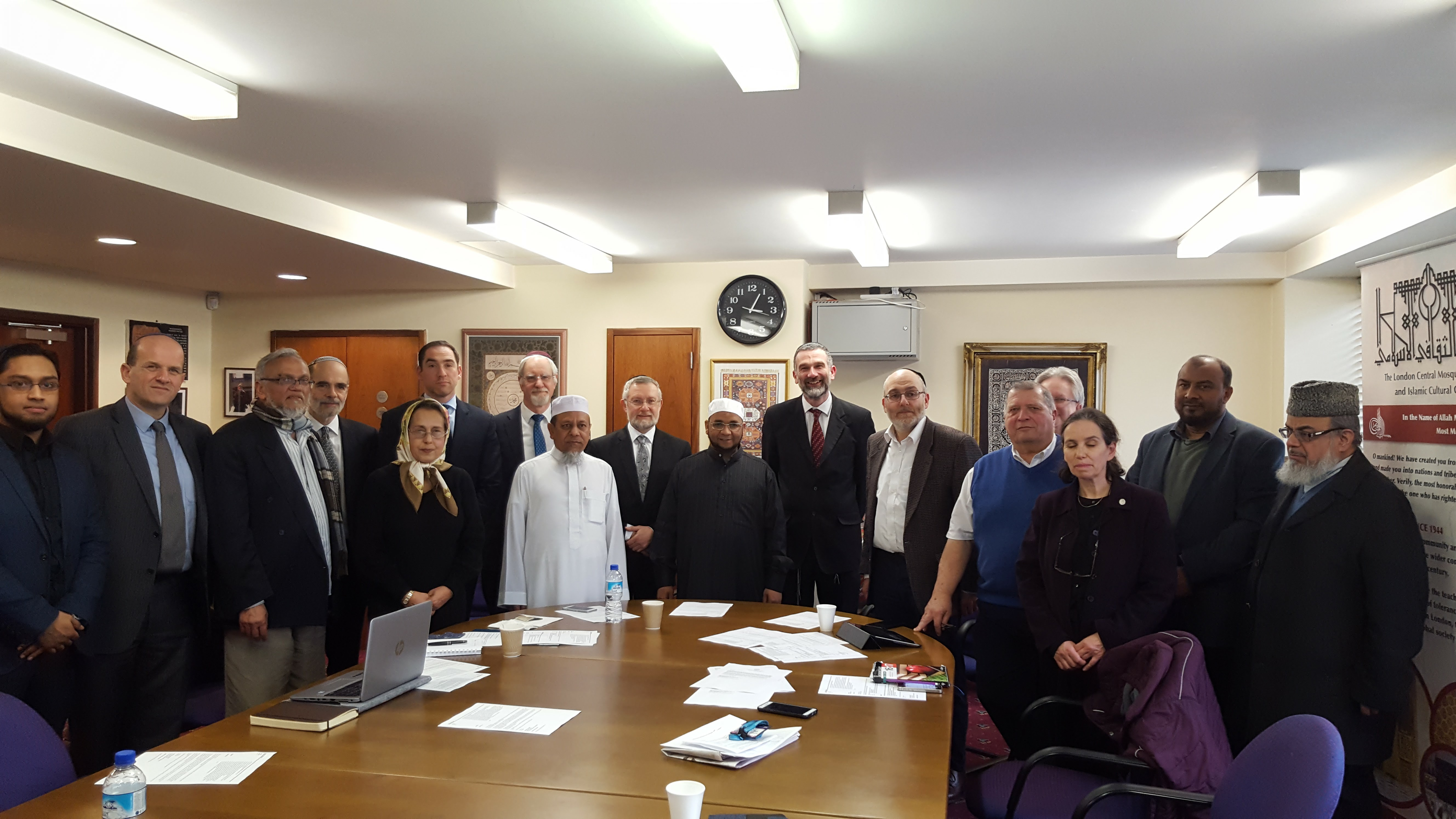
Interfaith meeting

Khalifa has participated in numerous seminars and conferences, building understanding and bridges between the Abrahamic faiths.

Khalifa participates in the annual interfaith weeks. In November 2016, Khalifa took part alongside 150 faith leaders from 12 different faiths, members of parliament and embassy representatives promoting the free practice of faith, forgiveness, humility, kindness and compassion.

In June 2017, Khalifa was the opening speaker in an interfaith Iftar at London Central Mosque welcoming more than 130 representatives from 12 faiths and religious sects, the Metropolitan Police, members of parliament and community leaders. They stood in solidarity, remembering recent incidents, including those at Manchester Arena, London Bridge, Finsbury Park Mosque and Grenfell Tower. They were remembered and he stressed the importance of all faiths to work together in order to prevent innocent people being misled into violence and hatred.

== International ventures ==
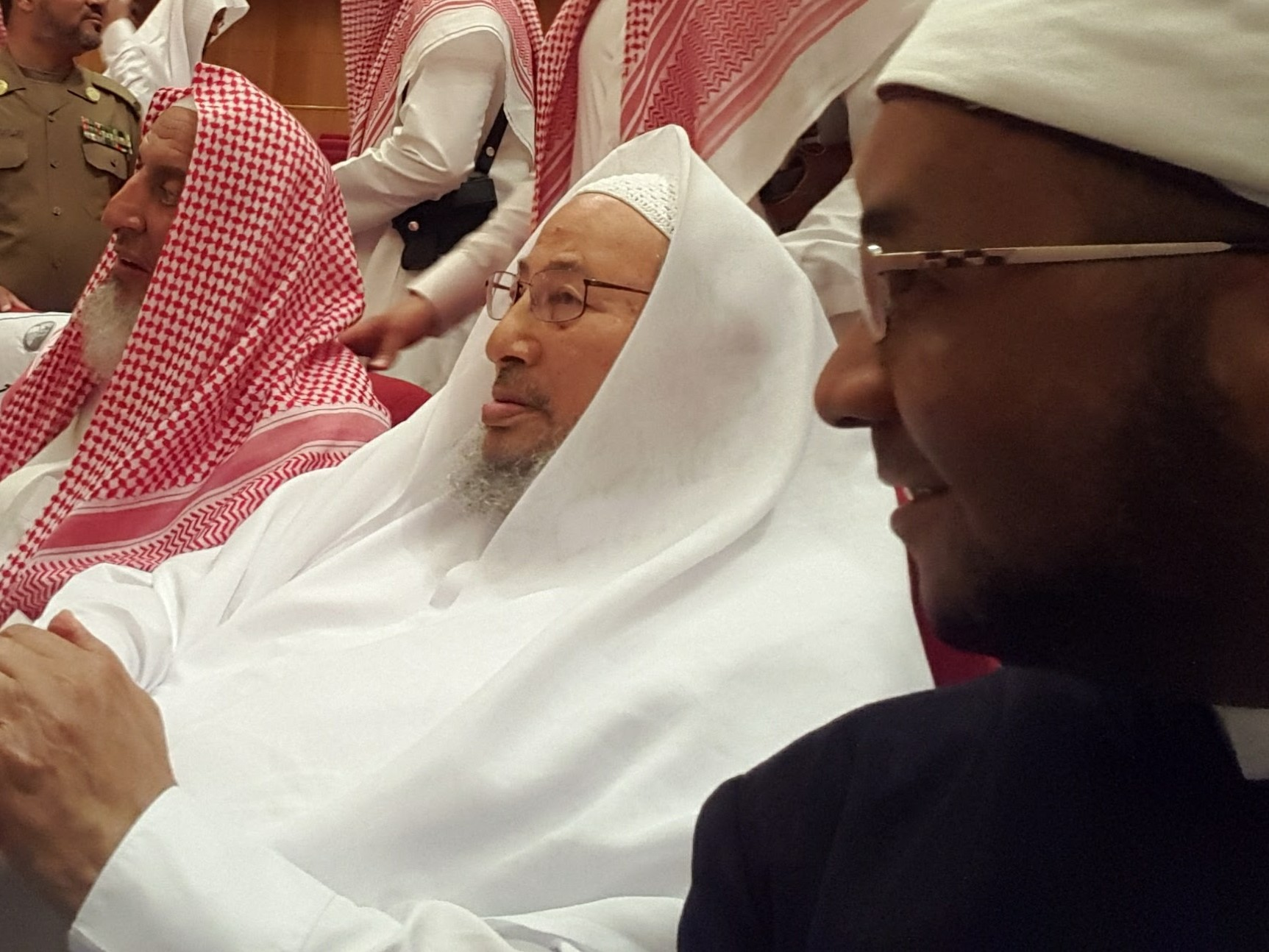
Meeting with the Grand Mufti of Saudi and Qaradawi

Khalifa, alongside nine members of the Council of Imams and Rabbis, visited Srebrenica in commemoration of the genocide of 1995 which killed 8,372 Bosnisan Muslims. In this visit, Khalifa was spreading the message of tolerance and coexistence.

In November 2017, Sultan Bello Mosque issued an official invitation to Khalifa to Nigeria. During his visit to four main cities in Nigeria, he met with Muslim leaders including the Grand Mufti and His Royal Highness the Emir of Kano. He also met with Officials and governors of some states.

== Collaborations ==
Khalifa was one of the Muslim leaders who welcomed the Grand Imam of Al-Azhar Dr Ahmad El Tayeb in a reception arranged by the Archbishop of Canterbury Justin Welby.

He was also one of the Muslim leaders who welcomed Dr. Sheikh Abdul Rahman Al-Sudais, head of the Office of the Presidency of the Grand Mosques of Makkah and the Prophet's Mosque in Madinah in July 2016, when he visited the London Central Mosque. Al-Sudais delivered a speech which Khalifa translated.

Khalifa plays a part in the Islamic Shari'a Council's role in tackling religious issues and solving matrimonial problems. He is also a member on the Major Mosques of London Committee.

== Media appearances ==
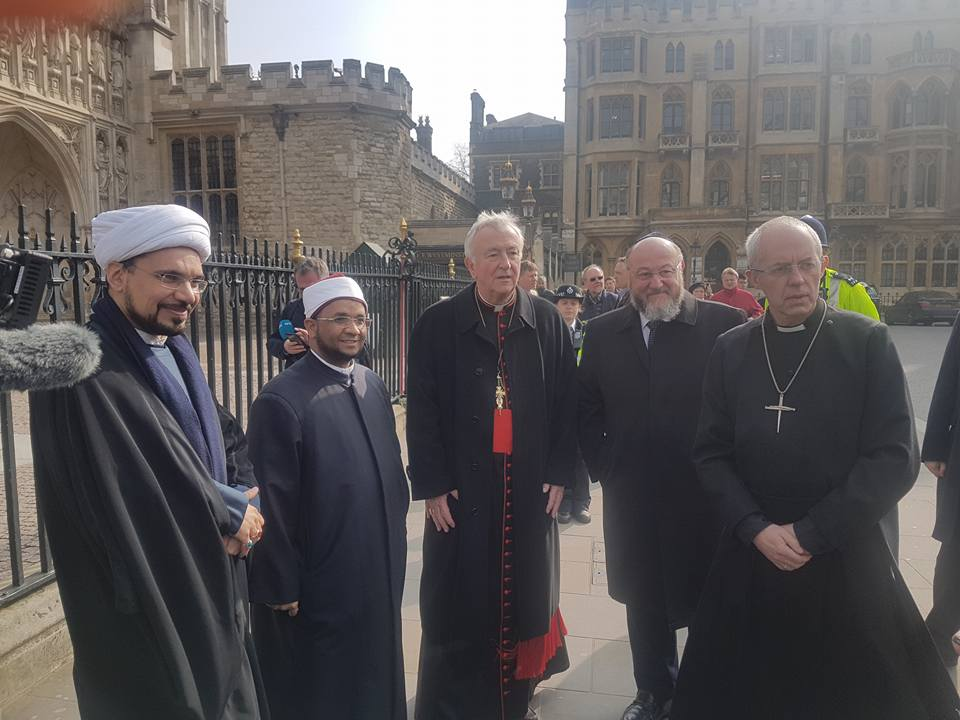
United against attack on London

He has appeared as a guest on many TV channels such as the BBC and Sky News. In his speech following the March 2017 attack on Westminster, he emphasised the importance of not linking such acts of terrorism to Islam, how the principles of Islam have no room for manoeuvre for any acts of violence, how methods of divide will not succeed and the paramount importance of remaining united together. An article has also been published by the BBC documenting this Television appearance.

== Publications ==
He has written a number of articles including:

Khalifa has contributed to the translation from Arabic to English of Islamic books, address contemporary issues and religious practices. Published in Cairo and London
