= Mahmoud Ezzat (disambiguation) =

Mahmoud Ezzat (Arabic: محمود عزت) may refer to:

- Mahmoud Ezzat (born 1961), Egyptian politician and physician.
- Mahmoud Ezzat (boxer) (1913–1974), Egyptian boxer
- Mahmoud Ezzat (footballer) (born 1992), Egyptian footballer
