= Izzat Hussain =

Indian television chef

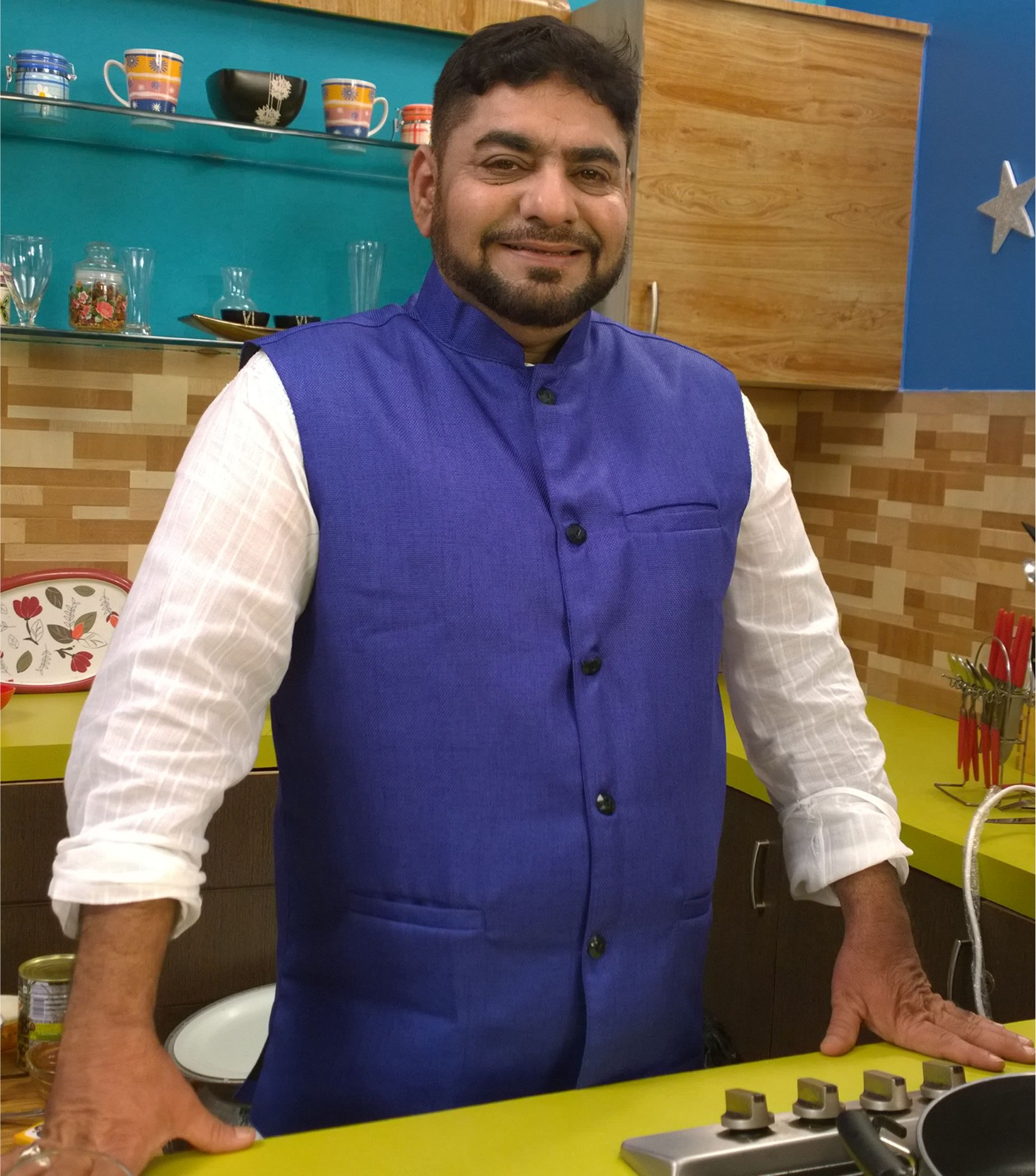
- Chef Izzat Hussain preparing a meal in Mumbai, 2021
- Culinary career
- Cooking style: Mughlai; Awadhi

Dr. Izzat Hussain is an Indian television chef, Unani physician, author, and restaurant consultant. He cooks traditional Mughlai and Awadhi cuisine.

His approach to cooking focuses on using natural ingredients and medicinal herbs. He does not use water or artificial colors in his cooking; instead he uses minimal oil and incorporates medicinal ingredients in his dishes. He uses milk instead of water.

== Career ==
He started his career as a doctor at a charitable hospital in Lucknow, Uttar Pradesh. Hussain began his culinary career as a freelance chef in India after working in many five-star hotels. He is the recipient of the Best Mughlai Chef of India Award by G-Plus Guwahati Food Awards 2015 at Guwahati by G-Plus Culinary. He is also the brand ambassador for Izzat Pasand, a brand of dry onions and flakes in India. Hussain's first TV show was QUEST on Traveller XP.

Hussain has been on TV series like Channel WIN, Travelers XP, and others. He is a consultant, with practices in establishing new restaurants, food services, and hospitals.

== Cookbook ==
Hussain has published a cookbook, Izzat Ka Khana: Awadhi and Mughlai Cuisine Recipes. It comprises a collection of recipes for "benefits of the human body", a range of medicinal preparations made with selected herbal and spices, fruits, and vegetables that have been used in Unani and herbal practices.
