= Izzat Hyat-Khan =

Pakistani businessman

Izzat Hayat Khan (also written Izzat Hyat-Khan sometimes) (16 August 1929 - 6 October 2002), was a Pakistani businessman and diplomat who served as Ambassador to Tunisia, and as a representative to the Arab League from 1980 to 1983.

== Early life and education ==
He attended the leading preparatory boarding school Prince of Wales Royal Indian Military College (now Rashtriya Indian Military College) in Dehra Dun, India, India.

== Key Career Events ==
After graduating, Khan joined Glaxo Laboratories' Executive Management Training program in the UK. At Glaxo, he held various executive management roles and was a member of the M&A team at Glaxo that completed the acquisition of Allen & Hanbury's in early 1958. In 1966, he set up F&I Industries (Pvt.) Limited, in Islamabad, Pakistan, a sugar confectionery products manufacturing company.

In 1980, Khan was nominated to build ties with Maghreb nations by serving as a specially politically appointed Ambassador to Tunisia and Special Envoy to the Arab League, by the Pakistani dictator and president General Zia-ul-Haq.

== Later life ==
He died in 2002 after a prolonged illness.
