= Michel Aflaq =

Syrian philosopher, sociologist and Arab nationalist (1910–1989)

Michel Aflaq ميشيل عفلق
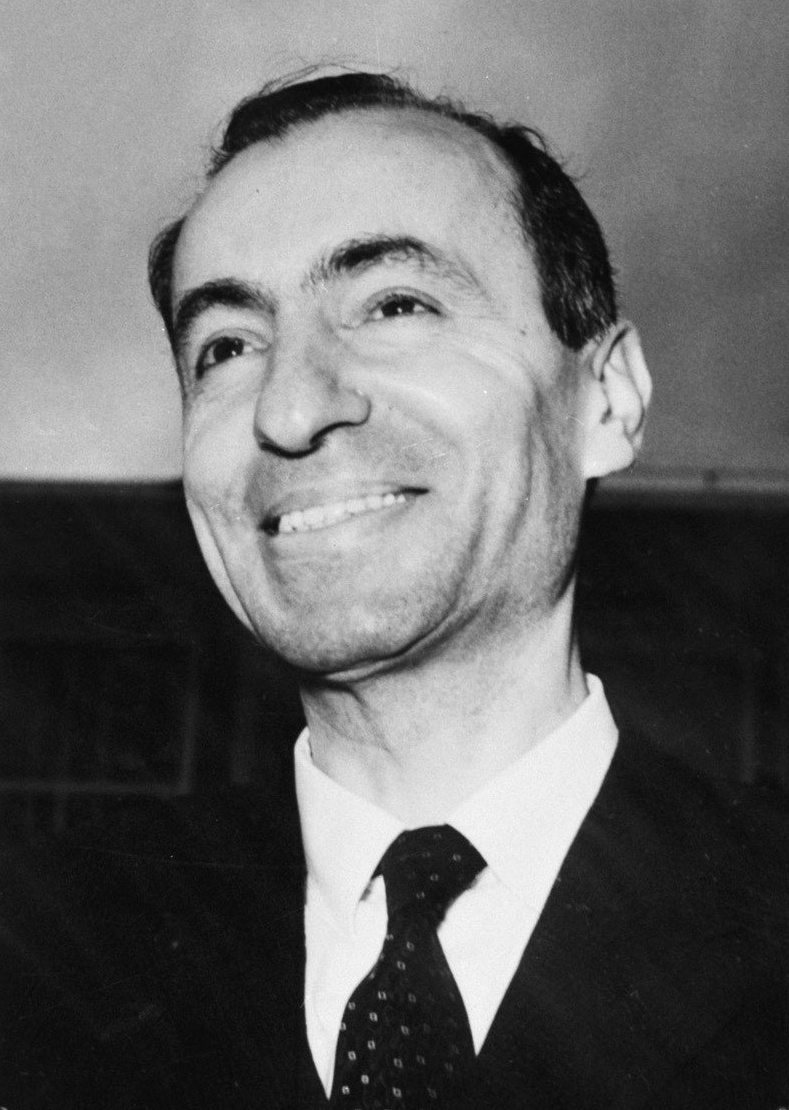
- Aflaq in 1963

Secretary General of the National Command of the Iraq-based Ba'ath Party
- In office 8 February 1968 – 23 June 1989
- Deputy: Shibli al-Aysami
- Preceded by: Position established
- Succeeded by: Saddam Hussein

Secretary General of the National Command of the Arab Socialist Ba'ath Party
- In office June 1954 – April 1965
- Preceded by: Position established
- Succeeded by: Munif al-Razzaz

Member of the National Command of the Arab Socialist Ba'ath Party
- In office 6 April 1947 – 23 February 1966

Personal details
- Born: 9 January 1910 Damascus, Ottoman Empire
- Died: 23 June 1989 (aged 79) Paris, France
- Resting place: Baghdad, Iraq
- Citizenship: Syria; Iraq
- Party: Arab Ba'ath Movement (1940–1947); Arab Socialist Ba'ath Party (1947–1966); Iraq-based Ba'ath Party (1968–1989)
- Education: University of Paris

Michel Aflaq (Arabic: ميشيل عفلق, romanized: Mīšīl ʿAflaq, Arabic pronunciation: [miˈʃel ˈʕaflaq]; 9 January 1910 – 23 June 1989) was a Syrian philosopher, sociologist and Arab nationalist. His ideas played a significant role in the development of Ba'athism and its political movement; he is considered by several Ba'athists to be the principal founder of Ba'athist thought. Aflaq published various books during his lifetime, such as The Road to Renaissance (1940), The Battle for One Destiny (1958) and The Struggle Against Distorting the Movement of Arab Revolution (1975).

Born into a middle-class family in Damascus, Syria, he studied at the Sorbonne, where he met his future political companion Salah al-Din al-Bitar. Aflaq returned to Syria (at that time part of the French-ruled Mandate for Syria and the Lebanon) in 1932, beginning his political career in communist politics. He became a communist activist, but broke his ties with the communist movement when the Syrian–Lebanese Communist Party supported colonial policies through the Popular Front under the French Mandate of Syria. In 1940, Aflaq and al-Bitar established the Arab Ihya Movement (later renaming itself the Arab Ba'ath Movement, taking the name from Zaki al-Arsuzi's group by the same name). The movement proved successful, and in 1947 the Arab Ba'ath Movement merged with al-Arsuzi's Arab Ba'ath organisation to establish the Arab Ba'ath Party. Aflaq was elected to the party's executive committee and was elected "'Amid" (meaning the party's leader).

The Arab Ba'ath Party merged with Akram al-Hawrani's Arab Socialist Party to establish the Arab Socialist Ba'ath Party in 1952; Aflaq was elected the party's leader in 1954. During the mid-to-late 1950s the party began developing relations with Gamal Abdel Nasser, the President of Egypt, which eventually led to the establishment of the United Arab Republic (UAR). Nasser forced Aflaq to dissolve the party, which he did, but without consulting with party members. Shortly after the UAR's dissolution, Aflaq was reelected as Secretary General of the National Command of the Ba'ath Party. Following the 8th of March Revolution, Aflaq's position within the party was weakened to such an extent that he was forced to resign as the party's leader in 1965. Aflaq was ousted during the 1966 Syrian coup d'état, which led to a schism within the Ba'ath Party. He escaped to Lebanon, but later went to Iraq. In 1968 Aflaq was elected Secretary General of the Iraqi-led Ba'ath Party; during his tenure he held no de facto power. He held the post until his death on 23 June 1989.

Aflaq's theories about society, economics, and politics, which are collectively known as Ba'athism, hold that the Arab world needs to be unified into one Arab Nation in order to achieve an advanced state of development. He was critical of both capitalism and communism, and critical of Karl Marx's view of dialectical materialism as the only truth. Ba'athist thought placed much emphasis on liberty and Arab socialism – a socialism with Arab characteristics, which was not part of the international socialist movement as defined by the West. Aflaq believed in the separation of state and religion, and was a strong believer in secularisation, but was against atheism. Although a Christian, he believed Islam to be proof of "Arab genius". In the aftermath of the 1966 Ba'ath Party split, the Syrian-led Ba'ath Party accused Aflaq of stealing al-Arsuzi's ideas, calling him a "thief" and later sentenced him to "death via absentia" in 1971. (Note: Sources: Tucker, Spencer (2010). "Aflaq, Michel". The Encyclopedia of Middle East Wars: The United States in the Persian Gulf, Afghanistan, and Iraq Conflicts. Vol. 1. ABC-CLIO. pp. 29, 30. ISBN 978-1851099474.; Cragg, Kenneth (1991). "7: Modern Arabs and the Intentions of Arabism". The Arab Christian: A History in the Middle East (1st ed.). Louisville, Kentucky, USA: Westminster John Knox Press. p. 162. ISBN 0-664-22182-3.; A. Shoup, John (2018). "Notable People in the History of Syria". The History of Syria. Santa Barbara, California: ABC-CLIO, LLC. pp. 151, 152. ISBN 978-1-4408-5834-5. LCCN 2018020377.; Tibi, Bassam (1997). "11: Pan-Arab Nationalism as Westernised ideology and politics of Arab States: Between Ba'thism and Nasserism until the Six-Day War". Arab Nationalism: Between Islam and the Nation-State (3rd ed.). London, UK: Macmillan Press Ltd. p. 205. ISBN 978-0-333-63647-3.; Dwyer, Kevin (2016). Arab Voices: The human rights debate in the Middle East. New York, NY: Routledge. ISBN 978-1-138-19070-2.; Roberts, David (2015). "11: Hafiz al-Asad - I". The Ba'ath and the creation of modern Syria (Routledge Library Editions: Syria ed.). Abingdon, Oxon: Routledge. p. 103. ISBN 978-0-415-83882-5.) The Iraqi-led Ba'ath Party rejects this, and does not believe that al-Arsuzi contributed to Ba'athist thought.

== Early life ==
Aflaq was born on 9 January 1910 to a middle-class Orthodox Christian family in Damascus where his father Joseph worked as a grain merchant. He was first educated in the Westernised schools of the French-ruled Mandate for Syria and the Lebanon. In 1929, he left Syria to study philosophy at the Sorbonne in Paris; during his stay, he was influenced by the works of Henri Bergson and met his longtime collaborator Salah al-Din al-Bitar, a fellow Syrian nationalist. Aflaq founded an Arab Student Union at the Sorbonne and discovered the writings of Karl Marx. He returned to Syria in 1932, and became active in communist politics, but left the movement when the government of Léon Blum, supported by the French Communist Party (PCF), continued France's old policies towards its colonies. Aflaq and others had believed that the PCF had a pro-independence attitude towards the French colonies. It did not help that the Syrian–Lebanese Communist Party (SLCP) supported the PCF's decision. From then on, Aflaq saw the communist movement as a tool of the Soviet Union. He was impressed by the organisation and ideology of Antun Saadeh's Syrian Social Nationalist Party.

== Political career ==
=== Arab Ba'ath Movement: 1940–1947 ===
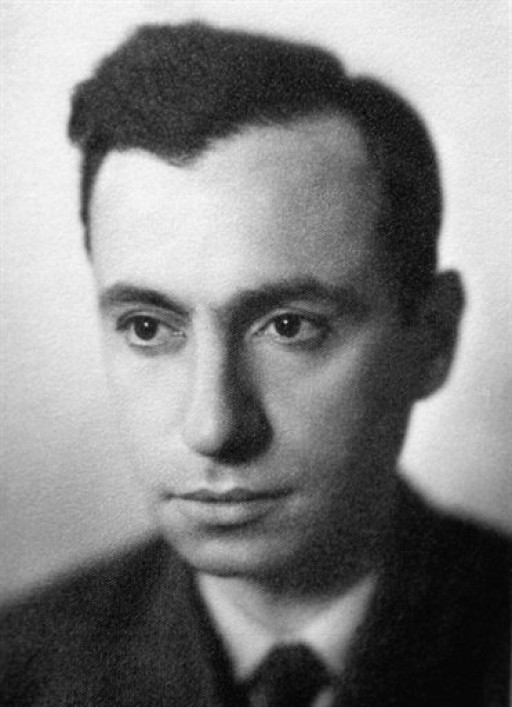
Aflaq in the late 1930s

Upon their return to Syria, Aflaq and al-Bitar became teachers at Tajhiz all'-Ula, "the most prestigious secondary school in Syria". Aflaq taught history, while al-Bitar taught math and physics. By 1940, Aflaq and al-Bitar had set up a student circle, which usually met on Fridays. That year, the Arab Ihya Movement, a political party, was established by Aflaq and al-Bitar. They used most of their spare time in 1941 to agitate for the party. It was in 1942 that Aflaq showed his skills as "a compelling speaker" who was able to utilize the "theatrical pause" to great effect. The party changed its name to Arab Ba'ath Movement to signify the radical changes which were sweeping the Middle East; Rashid Ali al-Gaylani, the Prime Minister of Iraq, had challenged Britain's domination over Iraq. The replacement of the word "Revival" with "Ba'ath" (Arabic: بعث, literally means resurrection/rebirth) signified that Arab revival had been replaced ideologically by the need for an Arab rebirth. The change of name led Zaki al-Arsuzi, leader of the Arab Ba'ath Party, to accuse Aflaq and al-Bitar of stealing his party's name from him. Though both men were promoting a party platform based on an Arab nationalist stance, Aflaq and al-Arsuzi became bitter rivals.

On 24 October 1942, both Aflaq and al-Bitar resigned from their teaching positions, now determined to devote themselves fully to the political struggle. In 1941 the Syrian Committee to Help Iraq was established to support the Iraqi Government led by Rashid Ali al-Gaylani against the British invasion during the Anglo–Iraqi War. Al-Arsuzi, the leader of the other Arab Ba'ath movement, was skeptical of the new committee, and opposed helping the Iraqis on the ground that they would lose anyway. In 1941 the movement began publishing documents under the name the "Arab Ihya Movement". Later, in 1945, Aflaq and al-Bitar asked the French Mandate authorities to grant the movement a party license. The Arab Ba'ath Movement did not become an official party until 1947, when it merged with al-Arsuzi's Arab Ba'ath Movement to found the Arab Ba'ath Party. The Arab Ba'ath Movement, led by Aflaq and al-Bitar, drew supporters from al-Arsuzi's Ba'ath Movement; during the 1940s, al-Arsuzi started to seclude himself from the public eye; he developed a deep distrust of others and became, according to some of his associates, paranoid. When the two Ba'ath movements merged and established the Arab Ba'ath Party in 1947, the only subject discussed was how much socialism to include; Wahib al-Ghanim and Jalal al-Sayyid from the al-Arsuzi-led Ba'ath movement wanted Aflaq and al-Bitar to adopt more radical socialist policies.

=== Founding and early years ===
The Arab Ba'ath Party's first congress was held in Damascus in 1947. Aflaq took the pre-eminent position of Amid (sometimes translated as 'doyen' or as 'leader') and was elected to a four-member executive committee. Under the constitution adopted at the congress, this made him effective leader of the party, with sweeping powers within the organisation. Al-Bitar was elected Secretary General of the National Command. Zaki al-Arsuzi, the leader of the Arab Ba'ath, was not given any position or membership in the party. As Amid, Aflaq was responsible for ideological affairs and became the party's mentor, while al-Bitar controlled the party's day-to-day management. The merger would prove problematic; several members of the al-Arsuzi-led Ba'ath Party were more left-leaning, and would become, later in Aflaq's tenure, highly critical of his leadership.

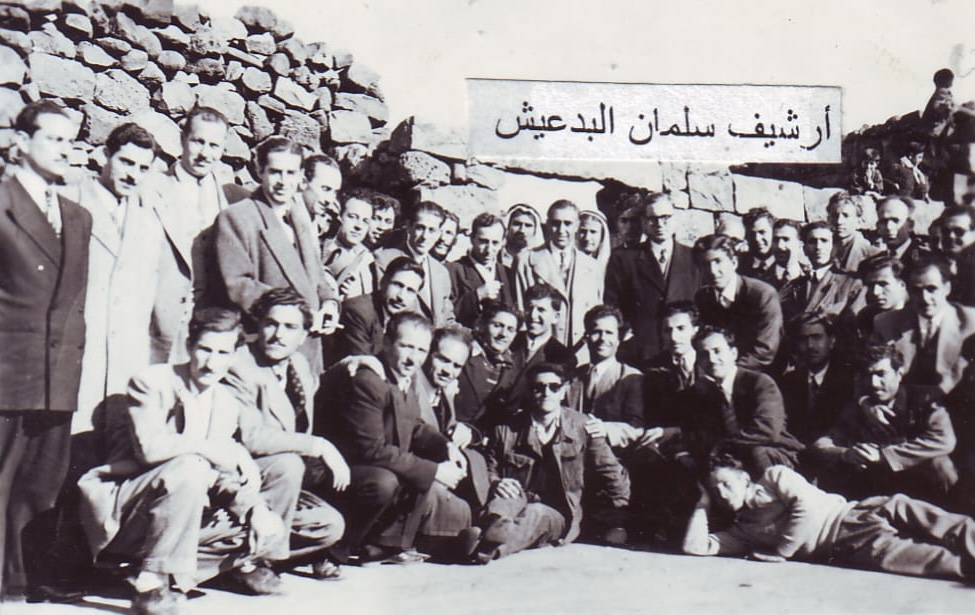
Aflaq and other Ba'ath Party leaders in 1954

In the late 1940s, Aflaq and al-Bitar gave free lessons on Ba'athist thought, and in 1948 established the newspaper al-Ba'ath. Aflaq tested the Ba'ath Party's strength during the 1948 Arab–Israeli War: after early Syrian defeats, he led several demonstrations against the government led by President Shukri al-Quwatli. He personally led demonstrations and claimed that al-Quwatli, a landowner, was a corrupt and capitalistic politician, who was to blame for the Syrian army's defeat. Aflaq called for al-Quwatli's resignation, and wrote several al-Ba'ath articles criticising his presidency and his prime minister, Jamil Mardam Bey, who later had Aflaq arrested. Al-Quwatli's government was brought down in a coup d'état led by military officer Husni al-Za'im. Al-Za'im banned all parties, claiming that Syria was not ready to establish a liberal democracy. Aflaq, who had been set free, was rearrested during al-Zai'm's presidency and sent to the notorious Mezzeh Prison. Al-Za'im's rule did not last for long, and in August 1949, he was toppled, and Hashim al-Atassi, who was democratically elected, took his place. Al-Atassi established a national unity government, and Aflaq was appointed to the post of Minister of Education, the only government post he would ever hold; he held it from August to December 1949. Al-Attasi's presidency did not last for very long either, and in 1951 Adib Shishakli took power in a military coup.

Aflaq at first extended his support to the new government, believing that he and the Ba'ath Party could collaborate with Shishakli because they shared the same Arab nationalist sentiments. His analysis of Shishakli proved to be wrong, and one of Shishakli's first decisions as ruler was to ban all political parties, including Aflaq's. The Ba'ath Party leadership, and several leading members, escaped to Lebanon in the wake of increased government repression. In Lebanon Aflaq and al-Bitar agreed to a merger of the Arab Ba'ath Party and the Arab Socialist Party (ASP), led by Akram al-Hawrani, to establish the Arab Socialist Ba'ath Party in 1952. The newly formed party worked as a base of operation against Shishakli's rule. Aflaq and the rest cooperated with non-Ba'athist opposition forces too. Shishakli was toppled in February 1954.

=== Power politics: 1954–1963 ===
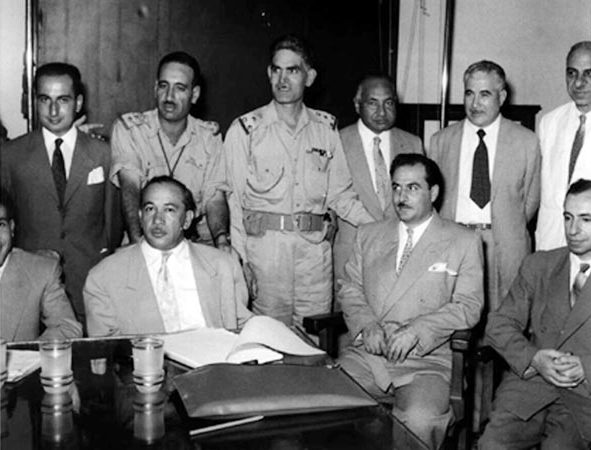
Aflaq (front row, first from right) with the leaders of the 14 July 1958 revolution in Iraq, including Khaled al-Naqshabendi (front row, left), Abd as-Salam Arif (back row, second from left), Abd al-Karim Qasim (back row, third from left), and Muhammad Najib ar-Ruba'i (back row, fifth from left)

Following the overthrow of al-Shishakli, Syria held its first democratic elections in five years. The Ba'ath Party, led by Aflaq, al-Bitar and al-Hawrani, had 22 members elected to parliament. (Note: Exactly how many seats the Arab Socialist Ba'ath Party won, varies from a low 16 seats to a high 22.: Abdulghani, Jasim (1984). Iraq & Iran: The Years of Crisis. Taylor & Francis. p. 28. ISBN 978-0801825194.; Beshara, Adel (2005). Lebanon: The Politics of Frustration – The Failed coup of 1961 (1 ed.). Routledge. p. 40. ISBN 978-0415351133.; Commins, Dean (2004). Historical Dictionary of Syria. Scarecrow Press. p. 66. ISBN 978-0810849341.) This increase in influence can largely be attributed to al-Hawrani – several old ASP strongholds voted for the Ba'ath Party because of al-Hawrani's presence. By this time Aflaq was losing much of his power to al-Hawrani and his supporters, who were in a majority in the party. Proof of this was the decision of the Ba'ath Party to collaborate openly with the Syrian Communist Party (SCP), a move Aflaq opposed. Aflaq was elected the party's Secretary General of the newly established National Command, a title equivalent to 'party leader', by the party's Second National Congress.

When, under the United Arab Republic (UAR), Aflaq was forced by Nasser to dissolve the party, he disbanded the party by himself, instead of convening a congress on the matter. The UAR proved to be disastrous for the Ba'ath Party – the party was sidelined to a great extent by Nasser's government. The Ba'ath movement, which in 1958 was on the verge of becoming the dominant Arab nationalist movement, found itself in disarray after three years of Nasserist rule. Only a handful of Ba'athists were given public office in the UAR's government; al-Hawrani became vice president and al-Bitar became Minister of Culture and Guidance. Several members, mostly young, blamed Aflaq for this situation; it was he who dissolved the party in 1958 without consulting the National Congress. Hafez al-Assad and Salah Jadid amongst others, eventually established the Military Committee to save the Syrian Ba'ath movement from annihilation. The party's Third National Congress in 1959 supported Aflaq's decision to dissolve the party, but a 1960 National Congress, in which Jadid was a delegate representing the then-unknown Military Committee, reversed the decision and called for the Ba'ath Party's reestablishment. The Congress also decided to improve relations with Nasser by democratising the UAR from within. A faction within the party, led by al-Hawrani, called for Syria's secession. When the UAR broke up in 1961, some members applauded the dissolution, such as al-Bitar.

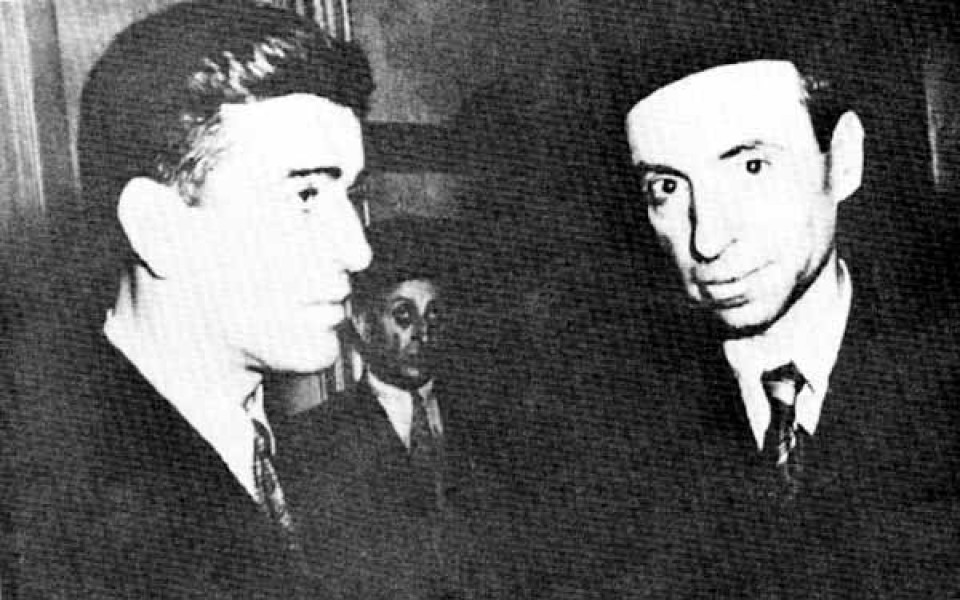
Aflaq (right) with al-Hawrani in 1957

The Ba'ath Party captured 20 seats, down from 22, in the 1961 election. In 1962, after four years, Aflaq convened the Fifth Congress in Homs. Al-Hawrani was not invited; cells that had stayed active and defied Aflaq's orders, and Ba'athists who became Nasserists during the period of the UAR, were not invited to the congress. Aflaq was reelected as the National Command's secretary general, and ordered the reestablishment of the Syrian-regional Ba'ath organisation. During the congress, Aflaq and the Military Committee, through Muhammad Umran, made contact for the first time; the committee asked for permission to initiate a coup d'état; Aflaq supported the conspiracy. Following the success of the February 1963 Iraqi coup d'état, led by the Ba'ath Party's Iraqi Regional Branch, the Military Committee hastily convened to hatch a coup against Nazim al-Kudsi's presidency. The 8th of March Revolution, a military coup launched in 1963, proved successful, and a Ba'athist government in Syria was established. The plotters' first order was to establish the National Council of the Revolutionary Command (NCRC), consisting entirely of Ba'athists and Nasserists, and controlled by military personnel rather than civilians from the very beginning.

=== The beginning: 1963–1964 ===
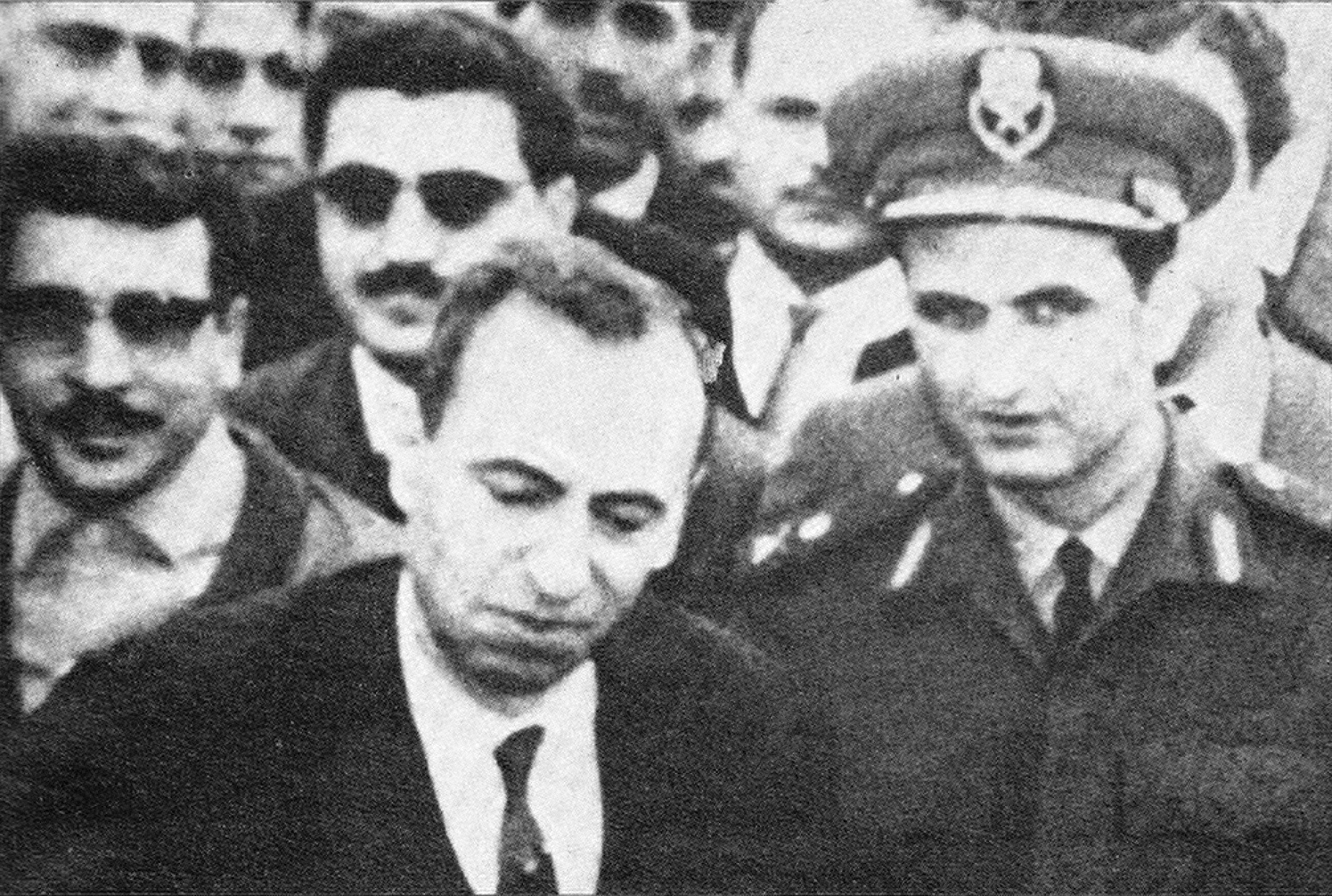
Aflaq and Salah Jadid in 1963, shortly after taking power

The relationship between the Ba'athists and the Nasserists was at best, uncomfortable. The Ba'ath Party's rise to power in Iraq and Syria put Nasser, as he put it, "between the hammer and the anvil". The establishment of a union between Iraq and Syria would weaken his credentials as a pan-Arab leader. Nasser launched bitter propaganda attacks against the party; Aflaq was dismissed as an ineffectual theorist who was mocked as a puppet "Roman emperor" and accused of being a "Cypriot Christian". In several Ba'ath Party meetings, Aflaq responded with pure anger, and became an anti-Nasserist. Because of the position he took, Aflaq had a falling out with al-Bitar who still believed there was a chance to reestablish good ties with Nasser.

The break with Nasser weakened the original leaders of the Ba'ath Party, which in turn gave the Military Committee room to expand. After taking power, the Military Committee looked for theoretical guidance, but instead of going to Aflaq to solve problems (which was usual before), they contacted the party's Marxist faction led by Hammud al-Shufi. At the Syrian Ba'athist Regional Congress, the Military Committee "proved" that it was rebelling equally against Aflaq and the traditional leadership, as against their moderate social and economic policies. The Military Committee was bent on removing Aflaq from a position of power, believing that he had become old and frail. At the Sixth National Congress held in October 1963, Aflaq was barely able to hold on to his post as Secretary General – the Marxist factions led by al-Shufi and Ali Salih al-Sa'di, in Syria and Iraq respectively, were the majority group. Another problem facing Aflaq was that several of his colleagues were not elected to party office; for instance, al-Bitar was not reelected to a seat in the National Command. Instead of the traditional civilian leadership, a new leadership consisting of military officers was gradually growing; Jadid and Amin al-Hafiz from Syria and Ahmed Hassan al-Bakr and Salih Mahdi Ammash from Iraq were elected to the National Command. While the Military Committee was in fact taking control over the Ba'ath Party from the civilian leadership, they were sensitive to such criticism, and stated, in an ideological pamphlet, that civilian-military symbiosis was of major importance if socialist reconstruction was to be achieved. To the outside world, Aflaq seemed to be in charge. The Tunisian newspaper L'Action tunisienne referred to him as "The philosopher who made two coups [Iraqi and Syrian coups] in a month".

The Ba'ath movement was not running as smoothly as the rest of the world believed; the Iraqi Regional Branch was already starting to lose membership. The Iraqi military and the party's militant arm, the National Guard, detested each other. Al-Sadi, the Regional Secretary of the Iraqi Regional Branch, was eventually exiled to Madrid, Spain on 11 November by several military officers and moderate Ba'athists. An anxious Aflaq hastily traveled from Syria and dissolved the Regional Command of the Iraqi Regional Branch, exclaiming that the National Command would rule Iraq in its place until a new Regional Command was elected. This was not greeted warmly by the majority of Iraqi military officers and Ba'athists – the idea that a Christian was to rule over a Muslim country was considered "insensitive".

The situation in Iraq did not improve, Abdul Salam Arif, the President of Iraq and a Nasserist, plotted a coup against the Ba'ath Party on 18 November, which succeeded. The dream of cornering Nasser's pan-Arab project was over; instead, it was Nasser and the Nasserists who were cornering the Ba'ath movement. On hearing the news, Aflaq and several Ba'athists fled Iraq for Syria.

=== The schism: 1964–1965 ===
After a falling out with the Military Committee, of which he was a member, Muhammad Umran told Aflaq about the committee's secret plans to oust the civilian leadership, led by Aflaq, and take over the Ba'ath Party. Shortly after, Umran was sent into exile as Ambassador to Spain for supporting the Aflaq faction. Aflaq responded to the threat posed to his leadership by invoking his office as secretary general, and calling for the National Command to dissolve the Regional Command. He was forced to withdraw his request when the majority of Ba'ath Party members proved to oppose such a move. A contest for power between Aflaq and the Military Committee ensued in the open; but it was a struggle Aflaq was losing. It was plain from the very beginning that the initiative lay with the anti-Aflaq forces. To counter the military threat, Aflaq invoked party rules and regulations against them. To counter this, the Military Committee befriended a staunchly anti-Aflaq civilian faction calling themselves the "Regionalists" – this group had not dissolved their party organisations as ordered by Aflaq in the 1950s.

The Regional Congress of the Syrian Regional Branch, in March 1965, devolved power from the center, the National Command, to the Regional Command. From then on, the Regional Secretary of the Regional Command was considered Syria's ex officio head of state. The Regional Secretary had the power to appoint the prime minister, the cabinet, the chief of staff and top military commanders. Aflaq was unsettled by the way things were moving, and in May he convened the Eighth National Congress to get a showdown between his followers and those of the Military Committee. However, this never came to fruition. Several civilian members of the National Command, such as the Lebanese Jibran Majdalani and the Saudi Ali Ghannam, advised caution, believing that if he pressed the Military Committee too hard the military would take over the Syrian Regional Branch, and then the Ba'ath Party – as had happened in Iraq following the ousting of the Iraqi Regional Branch. Because of their concerns, Aflaq kept quiet. But to his astonishment, keeping quiet caused him to lose his post as Secretary General – Aflaq was succeeded as Secretary General of the National Command by Munif al-Razzaz, a Jordanian of Syrian origin. However, the power between the two camps was unexpectedly reshuffled when Amin al-Hafiz defected to Aflaq's camp. In contrast to other military officers al-Hafiz had very little influence within or outside the party. Al-Hafiz's defection led to a resurgence of activity within Aflaq's faction. Al-Bitar and Umran were brought back from Spain to form a new government.

=== Downfall: 1966–1968 ===
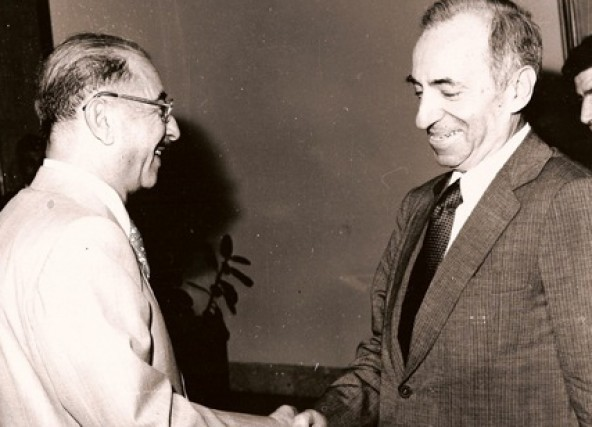
Ahmed Hassan al-Bakr (left), the Regional Secretary of the Iraqi Ba'ath branch, shaking hands with Aflaq in 1968

Al-Razzaz, Aflaq's successor as secretary general, came from the pro-Aflaq faction. With the defection of al-Hafiz, he ordered that the National Command was the de jure ruling body of the Ba'ath Party. He appointed al-Bitar prime minister, Umran defence minister, Mansur al-Atrash as Chairman of the National Council of the Revolutionary Command and al-Hafiz retained his post as President of Syria. Salah Jadid, the Military Committee's strongman, responded by arresting several Umran supporters. Umran responded by dismissing a handful of pro-Jadid officials. The most important of these dismissals was the removal of Ahmad Suwaydani from the post of head of the country's military intelligence to head of the Officer Administration. On 23 February 1966, a coup d'état led by Jadid and Hafez al-Assad overthrew the Syrian Government and the Ba'ath Party leadership. Aflaq was exiled from Syria, and ordered never to return to his homeland. Members of the party's other factions fled; Aflaq was captured and detained, along with other pro-Aflaq supporters, in a government guest house. When the new rulers launched a purge in August that year, Aflaq managed to make his escape, with the help of Nasim Al Safarjalani and Malek Bashour, both closely trusted friends and colleagues, and hence was able to flee to Beirut, Lebanon, and later to Brazil.

Aflaq's downfall caused a split within the Ba'ath Party; the party was de facto dissolved and two Ba'ath Parties were established, one Iraqi-led Ba'ath Party and one Syrian-led Ba'ath Party. The Syrian-led party was led by Jadid and his supporters and hailed Zaki al-Arsuzi, the founder of the Arab Ba'ath in 1940, as the father of Ba'athist thought, while the Iraqi-led party led by Ahmed Hassan al-Bakr and Saddam Hussein, still proclaimed Aflaq to be the founder of Ba'athist thought. In February 1966 at the Ninth National Congress, held after the coup which ousted the pro-Aflaq faction, the Iraqi delegation split with the Syrian Ba'athists. The Iraqis held the true Ninth National Congress in February 1968 in Beirut, and elected Aflaq as Secretary General of the National Command. Aflaq's election to the secretary generalship also proved to be his final break with al-Bitar; before the congress convened al-Bitar announced that he had left the Ba'ath Party and given up on the Ba'athist movement as a whole.

=== Iraqi-led Ba'ath Party: 1968–1989 ===
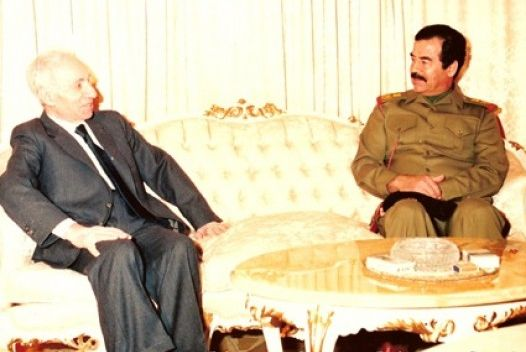
Michel Aflaq in conversation with Saddam Hussein in 1988

Aflaq moved to Baghdad following his reelection to the secretary generalship in February 1968. He stayed there until 1970, when Black September happened, he criticized the Ba'ath leadership for doing too little to help the Palestine Liberation Organisation during the conflict. During the conflict, Aflaq lobbied extensively for Yasser Arafat and the PLO. Aflaq wanted Iraqi intervention; al-Bakr, however, refused to get Iraq involved in such a conflict. Because of this, Aflaq returned to Lebanon in self-imposed exile. The government of Hafez al-Assad, the President of Syria, condemned Aflaq to death in absentia in 1971.

After four years of self-imposed exile Aflaq returned to Iraq in 1974, a year before the Lebanese Civil War broke out. He refrained from taking part in Iraqi politics. He published several works during this period, the most notable being The Struggle Against Distorting the Movement of Arab Revolution in 1975. Aflaq regained some of his influence when he befriended Saddam Hussein, President of Iraq from 1979 until 2003. During the Iran–Iraq War the Iranian leadership accused Hussein of being under the control of a Christian, and Aflaq himself was labelled "a Christian infidel". Effectively, throughout his tenure as secretary general in Iraq, Aflaq was given all due honour as the founder of the Ba'ath movement, but on policy-making, he was ignored.

== Death and funeral ==
Aflaq died on 23 June 1989 in Paris, after undergoing heart surgery there. Upon his death, he was given a state funeral. A large tomb and mausoleum were erected to form a shrine for him. The tomb, widely regarded as a work of great artistic merit, designed by Iraqi architect Rifat Chadirji, was located on the western grounds of the Ba'ath Party Pan-Arab Headquarters, at the intersection of Al-Kindi street and the Qadisiyyah Expressway overpass. Although there were rumors and accusations that his tomb was destroyed during the 2003 Iraq War, the burial chamber and building above it were left untouched. Its blue-tiled dome can be seen above the concrete T-walls surrounding the Camp's perimeter.

== Alleged conversion to Islam ==
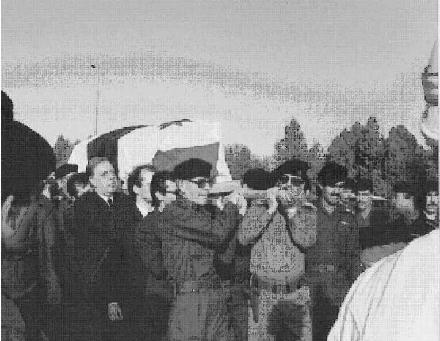
Aflaq's coffin carried by Saddam Hussein and Izzat Ibrahim ad-Douri

Saddam Hussein claimed that Aflaq converted to Islam before his death. According to anonymous Western diplomats, Aflaq's own family disagreed with that claim; however, Aflaq's son, Iyad, confirmed that his father thought about conversion in 1980. Upon his disputed conversion, he supposedly adopted "Ahmed" as a first name. According to the German orientalists Martin Robbe and Gerhard Höpp, the conversion happened before 1988. Regardless of the disagreements about his religion, he was given an Islamic funeral. According to the Berkley Center, anonymous members of Aflaq's family claimed that Aflaq's conversion was a "lie" made up by Saddam Hussein which he used as a tool to distance Ba'athism from Christianity. The tomb constructed on the orders of Hussein was later used as a military barrack by American soldiers after the 2003 American invasion of Iraq for troops stationed within the Green Zone. Aflaq's family reported that the tomb was badly damaged during the invasion.

== Thought ==
Michel Aflaq

Philosophical work
- Era: Modern philosophy: 20th century philosophy
- Region: Middle Eastern philosophy: Islamic philosophy
- School: Ba'athism, Arab nationalism, Arab socialism
- Main interests: Politics, philosophy, sociology, nationalism, philology history
- Notable ideas: Principal founder of Ba'athism, The Battle for One Destiny, The Struggle Against Distorting the Movement of Arab Revolution

=== "Unity, liberty, socialism" ===
What liberty could be wider and greater than binding oneself to the renaissance of one's nation and its revolution? The liberty we seek is not opposed to legislative measures to curb the exploitations of feudalists, capitalists and opportunists. It is a new and strict liberty which stands against pressure and confusion. Dictatorship is a precarious, unsuitable and self-contradictory system which does not allow the consciousness of the people to grow.

— Aflaq in a speech, talking about one of the key Ba'athist tenets; "freedom will come to the Arabs through unity"

The Arab Socialist Ba'ath Party slogan "Unity, liberty, socialism" is the key tenet of Aflaq's and Ba'athist thought. Unity meant the unification of the Arab people into one nation, the Arab Nation. The creation of an Arab Nation would have direct implications on Arab development. The establishment of this new state would lead to an Arab Ba'ath (literally meaning "renaissance"). The Arab nations of his time could only progressively "decline" if not unified; these nations had various ailments – "feudalism, sectarianism, regionalism, intellectual reactionism". The only way to "cure" the Arab nations was, according to Aflaq, through a revolutionary movement. Aflaq was influenced by Marxism in that he initially need for a vanguard party to rule the Arab Nation for a transitionary period of time - although much of his later writings are critical of vanguard parties, calling them "unsuitable and self-contradictory" and suggests that a dictatorship that acts on behalf of the people will destroy the revolution as it does not consult the people.

The need for liberty was one of the defining features of Ba'athism; however, this was not liberty in the sense used by liberal democracies, rather his own form of socialist democracy that had "socialist legislation" as part of its foundation. Aflaq was a strong believer in pluralism of thought and was very critical of one-party military rule.

The last tenet, 'socialism', did not mean socialism as it is defined in the West, but rather a unique form of Arab socialism, a term coined by Aflaq. Socialism, in its original form in the Arab world had, according to Aflaq, first come into being under the rule of Muhammad. The point of Arab socialism was not to answer questions such as: how much state control was necessary, or economic equality; but instead Arab socialism was a system that freed the Arab people from oppression and enslavement, which in turn created independent individuals.

Aflaq opposed Marx's view that dialectical materialism was the only truth, but believed that the "importance of material economic conditions in life" was one of the greatest discoveries in modern history. Even so, Aflaq was critical of both capitalism and communism, and did not want either of the two power blocs to collapse during the Cold War, believing that the Cold War was a sort of check and balance on their power. For more than 2 decades, Michel Aflaq's essay compilation titled Fi Sabil al-Ba'ath (trans: "The Road to Renaissance") was the primary ideological book of the Ba'ath party. The work was published by Aflaq in 1940.

=== Views on religion ===
Aflaq's advocacy of a national revival conflicted with the problem of reconciling goals of Arab nationalism with the universal Islamic values so engrained in Arab life. His answer was to assert that Islam was the most sublime expression of Arabism: one had grown out of the other and there is no contradiction between them. He argued that Islam, from its inception, revealed in Arabic Qur'an, meets Arab needs, embodies Arab values and launched Arabs on their conquest of the known world. The idea of Islam being a culture rather than a faith took special attention from Arab Christians such as Aflaq. These views, however, were highly unorthodox and controversial when aired in lectures at Damascus University. They garnered significant criticism from devout Muslims, who viewed the suggestion that the Arab genius was the flowering of Islam rather than the revelation of God as offensive. Additionally, Christians accused him of selling out and nicknamed him 'Muhammed Aflaq'.

Being influenced by a mixture of radical Hobbesian and Marxist ideas, Michel Aflaq viewed religion as the "opiate of the masses", which subverted efforts for the advancement of a socialist revolution. In 1956, Aflaq asserted that religion was a tool used by the elites of the traditional social order to maintain a corrupt system which facilitated the oppression and exploitation of the weaker classes of the society. He also claimed that religion was regularly exploited by oppressive elites to sedate the people and prevent the outbreak of mass revolutions against the prevailing socio-political order. Aflaq wrote in Fi Sabil al-Ba'ath:

"... the oppressed who see religion in this era a weapon that the oppressors rely upon ... those who exploit the corrupt situation exploit this corruption because it drugs the people and because it prevents the people from a revolution against its oppressors and its enslavers."

What Aflaq saw in Islam was a revolutionary movement. In contrast to other nationalities, the Arab awakening and expansion was attributed to a religious message. Because of this, Aflaq believed that the Arabs' spirituality was directly linked to Islam. Therefore, one could never take Islam out of the equation of what is essentially, and essentially is not, Arab. Arab nationalism, just as Islam had been during the lifetime of Muhammad, was a spiritual revolutionary movement, leading the Arabs towards a new renaissance: Arab nationalism was the second revolution to appear in the Arab world. All Arab religious communities should, according to Aflaq, respect and worship the spirituality of Islam, even if they did not worship Islam in a religious sense – Aflaq was a Christian who worshipped Islam. Aflaq did not believe it was necessary to worship Muhammad, but believed that all Arabs should strive to emulate Muhammad. In the words of Aflaq himself, Arabs "belong to the nation that gave birth to a Muhammad; or rather, because this Arab individual is a member of the community which Muhammad put all his efforts into creating […] Muhammad was all the Arabs; let us today make all the Arabs Muhammad." The Muslim of Muhammad's days were, according to Aflaq, synonymous with Arabs – the Arabs were the only ones to preach the message of Islam during Muhammad's lifetime. In contrast to Jesus, who was a religious leader, but not a political leader, Muhammad was both – the first leader of Islam and of the Arab world. Therefore, secularisation could not take the same shape in the Arab world as it did in the West.

Aflaq called on all Arabs, both Muslim and non-Muslim alike, to admire the role Islam had played in creating the Arab character. But his view on Islam was purely spiritual, and Aflaq emphasised that Islam "should not be imposed" on state and society. Time and again Aflaq emphasised that the Ba'ath party was against atheism, but also equally against fundamentalism. For him, any fundamentalism represented a "shallow, false faith." According to Ba'athist ideology, all religions were equal. Despite his anti-atheist stance, Aflaq was a strong supporter of secular government, and stated that a Ba'athist state would replace religion with a state "based on a foundation – Arab nationalism, and a moral – freedom."

Aflaq also expressed an intense opposition to Zionism, regarding it as imperialist and inextricably tied to Western Imperialist movements. However, his writings acknowledged the persecution of Jewish populations in Europe ("the special historical situation"), and his proposed "answer" to Zionism was to ensure the rights of the Jewish population in the Middle East in order to "remove the fears of the Jewish minority of the impossibility of living peacefully and justly with the Arabs". Aflaq believed that by ensuring "socialist progress for all the peoples together", Zionism would collapse, being no longer needed to protect the Jewish population from antisemitism.

== Reception and legacy ==
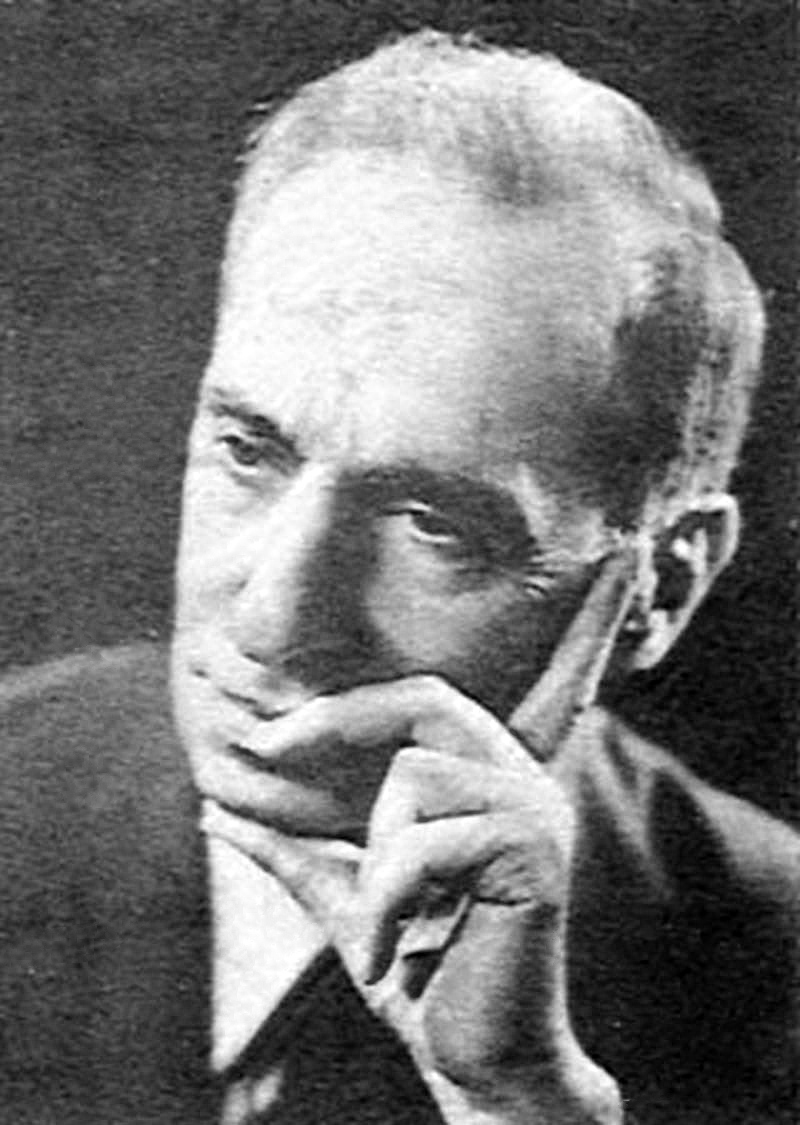
Aflaq's theoretical contributions have been met with mixed reactions.

In contrast to his longtime friend and colleague Salah al-Din al-Bitar, who was more often seen as practical when it came to politics, Aflaq often viewed as a "visionary, the dreamer rather unfitted for political life". Aflaq was described by his associates as an "ascetic, shy and intense figure living a simple and unpretentious life." He was known often for acting collaboratively, seeking help from other people instead of fulfilling his goal by himself or with others he led. Aflaq collaborated with Gamal Abdel Nasser, Abd al-Karim Qasim and Abdul Rahman Arif in 1958, to Ahmed Hassan al-Bakr and Ali Salih al-Sadi in 1963 and finally in the 1970s to Saddam Hussein. There are several Ba'athists, mostly from the Syrian-led Ba'ath Party, who believe Aflaq stole Ba'athist ideology from its original founder, Zaki al-Arsuzi. These individuals have denounced, and labelled, Aflaq as a "thief". Aflaq is well known in modern Iraq, although in the Western world his impact is often overshadowed by Saddam Hussein - Ba'athism is frequently viewed by the public interchangeably with the separate but related Saddamism.

Iraqi interventionist Fouad Ajami criticised Aflaq for a lack of real substance, stating, "Nearly three hundred pages of text yield no insight, on his part, into what went wrong and what needed to be done; there is only the visible infatuation with words", and "Aflaq summons the party to renounce power and go back to its 'pure essence'. There is some truth in this critique." Aflaq spent much time and energy writing optimistically about the future, and the past, of the Arab Nation, and how the Arab World could be unified. Another Iraqi interventionist, Kanan Makiya, the author of Republic of Fear: The Politics of Modern Iraq, claimed that for "Aflaq, reality is confined to the inner world of the party." In contrast to other philosophers, such as Karl Marx or John Locke, Aflaq's ideological view of the world makes tends to make no clear stand on the materialistic or socioeconomic behavior of humanity. While other philosophers make distinctions between what is real and what is not real, that is between prescriptive and descriptive analysis, Aflaq did not as a rule define what is and what ought to be. In his thought, both are molded into the same category: that which is attainable.

In his writings, Aflaq had been stridently in favor of free speech and other human rights and aid for the lower classes. During the Military Committee's gradual takeover of power in Syria, Aflaq rallied against what he saw as the establishment of a military dictatorship, instead of the democracy for which Aflaq had planned. These ideals were never realized by the governments that used his ideology. Most scholars see the Assad government in Syria and Saddam Hussein's government in Iraq to have only employed Aflaq's ideology as a pretense for dictatorship.

== Selected works ==
- في سبيل البعث (English: On the Way of Resurrection, published 1947)
- اتحاد سوريا ومصر (English: Unity Between Syria and Egypt, published 1958)
- معركة المصير الوحيد (English: The Battle for One Destiny, published 1958)
- نقطة البداية (English: The Starting Point, published 1971)
- البعث والوحدة (English: The Ba'ath and Arab Unity, published 1972)
- البعث والاشتراكية (English: The Ba'ath and Socialism, published 1973)
- النضال ضد تشويه حركة الثورة العربية (English: The Struggle Against Distorting the Movement of Arab Revolution, published 1975)

== Notes and references ==
=== Bibliography ===
- Abdulghani, Jasim (1984). Iraq & Iran: The Years of Crisis. Taylor & Francis. ISBN 978-0801825194.
- Ali, Tariq (2003). The Clash of Fundamentalisms: Crusades, Jihads and Modernity. Verso. ISBN 978-1859844571.
- Benewick, Robert; Green, Phillip (1988). The Routledge Dictionary of Twentieth-century Political Thinkers. Routledge. ISBN 978-0415096232.
- Bengio, Ofra (1998). Saddam's Word: Political Discourse in Iraq. Oxford University Press. ISBN 978-0195151855.
- Commins, Dean (2004). Historical Dictionary of Syria. Scarecrow Press. ISBN 978-0810849341.
- Curtis, Michel (1971). People and Politics in the Middle East: The Arab-Israeli Conflict-Its Background and the Prognosis for Peace. Transaction Publishers. ISBN 978-0878550005.
- George, Alan (2003). Syria: Neither Bread nor Freedom. Zed Books. ISBN 978-1842772133.
- Ginat, Rami (2010). Syria and the Doctrine of Arab Neutralism: From Independence to Dependence. Sussex Academic Press. ISBN 978-1845190088.
- Harris, William (1997). Challenges to Democracy in the Middle East. Markus Wiener Publishers. ISBN 978-1-55876-149-0.
- Helms, Christine Moss (1984). Iraq: Eastern Flank of the Arab World. Brookings Institution Press. ISBN 978-0815735557.
- Hopwood, Derek (1988). Syria 1945–1986: Politics and Society. Routledge. ISBN 978-0044450467.
- Jabel, Kamel Abu (1966). The Arab Baʻth Socialist Party: History, Ideology, and Organization. Syracuse University Press.
- Kostiner, Joseph (1998). Conflict and Cooperation in the Gulf Region. VS Verlag. ISBN 978-3531162058.
- Makiya, Kanan (1998). Republic of Fear: The Politics of Modern Iraq. University of California Press. ISBN 978-0520214392.
- Moubayed, Sami M. (2006). Steel & Silk: Men and Women who shaped Syria 1900–2000. Cune Press. ISBN 978-1885942418.
- Nohlen, Grotz; Grotz, Florian; Hartmann, Christof (2001). Elections in Asia and the Pacific: a Data Handbook. Vol. 1. University of California Press. ISBN 978-0199249589.
- Seale, Patrick (1990). Asad: The Struggle for the Middle East. University of California Press. ISBN 978-0520069763.
- Shair, Kamal (2006). Out of the Middle East: The Emergence of an Arab Global Business. I.B. Tauris. ISBN 978-1845112714.
- Rabil, Robert (2006). Syria, the United States, and the War on Terror in the Middle East. Greenwood Publishing Group. ISBN 978-0275990152.
- Rabinovich, Itamar (1972). Syria under the Baʻth, 1963–66: the Army Party Symbiosis. Transaction Publishers. ISBN 978-0878551637.
- Reich, Bernard (1990). Political Leaders of the Contemporary Middle East and North Africa: a Biographical Dictionary. Greenwood Publishing Group. ISBN 978-0313262135.
- Tucker, Spencer (2010). The Encyclopedia of Middle East Wars: The United States in the Persian Gulf, Afghanistan, and Iraq Conflicts. Vol. 1. ABC-CLIO. ISBN 978-1851099474.
- Tucker, Spencer; Roberts, Priscilla Mary (2008). The Encyclopedia of the Arab–Israeli conflict: a political, social, and military history: A–F. Vol. 1. ABC-CLIO. ISBN 978-1851098415.
- Salem, Paul (1994). Bitter Legacy: Ideology and Politics in the Arab World. Syracuse University Press. ISBN 978-0-8156-2628-2.
