= Ezatollah Janmaleki =

Iranian footballer

Personal information
- Full name: Ezatollah Janmaleki
- Date of birth: 7 February 1947
- Place of birth: Iran
- Height: 1.72 m (5 ft 8 in)
- Position: Defender

Senior career*
Years	Team	Apps	(Gls)
1969–1977	Taj SC		

International career
1974–1975	Iran	6	(1)
- * Club domestic league appearances and goals

Ezatollah Janmaleki is an Iranian football defender who played for Iran. He also played for Taj SC.
