= Izzat Husrieh =

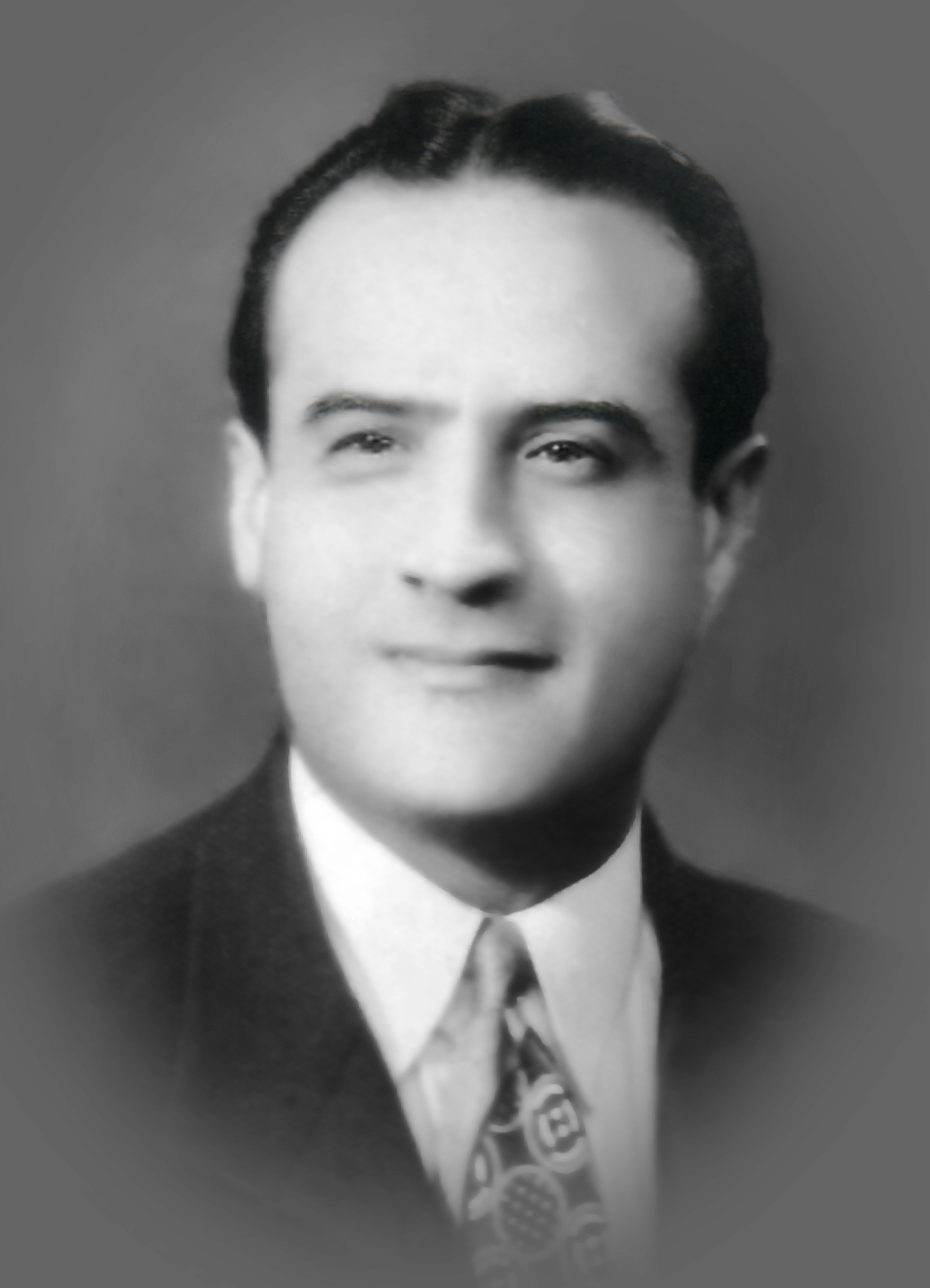
- Born: 1914; Damascus, Syria
- Died: 4 November 1975 (aged 60–61); Damascus, Syria
- Occupation: Writer Journalist
- Children: Abdulkader Husrieh
- Writing career
- Subjects: Syria and the Middle-east
- Website: www.husrieh.com

Izzat Husrieh (Arabic: عزة حصرية; 1914 – 4 November 1975) was a renowned Syrian journalist, author, publisher and researcher. He contributed several books to the Arab library and his famous newspaper Al-Alam continued to form public opinion in Syria for two decades.

== Early life ==
Husrieh was born to a prominent family in Amara District in Old Damascus, where he was educated in its primary schools. He then continued his education at The Higher Arab Academy for Translation.

In 1932, Husrieh began to write a weekly column for the daily, al-Sha'b. One year later, he co-founded the Syrian Labor Union in Damascus and helped establish branches in Aleppo, Homs, and Hama.

== Career ==
In 1936, Husrieh allied himself with Abd al-Rahman Shahbandar, leader of the Syrian opposition to the National Bloc regime of President Hashim al-Atassi. Shahbandar and Husrieh spoke out against the Franco-Syrian Treaty that Atassi had signed in Paris in 1936 that promised Syrian independence from France over a 25-year period.

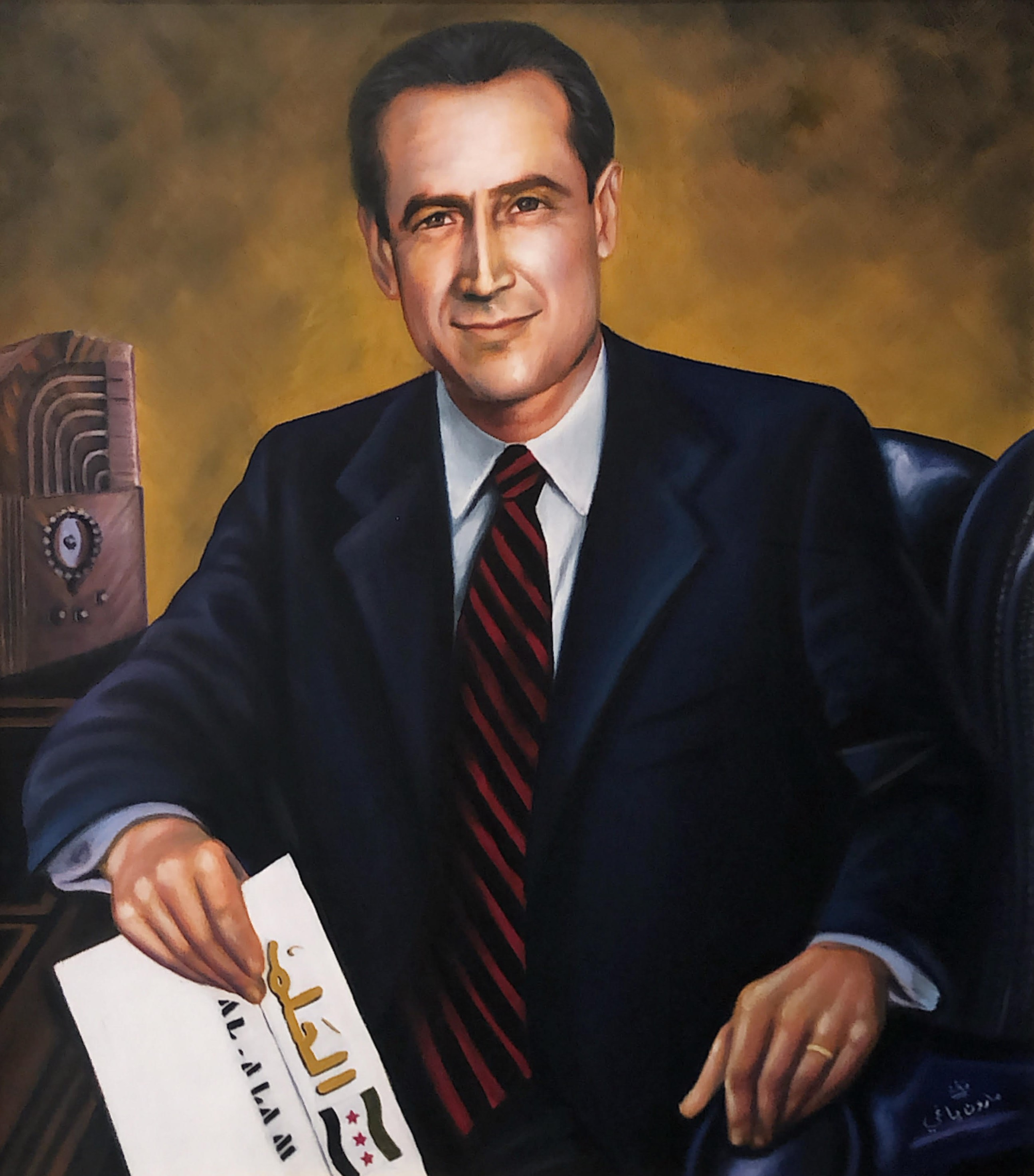
A portrait painting of renowned Syrian journalist, author, publisher and researcher, Izzat Husrieh.

Husrieh argued that the National Bloc had given too many concessions to the French, including the right to maintain military bases in Syria for use in the event of war in Europe. Jamil Mardam Bey, the architect of the 1936 treaty who had become prime minister shortly after that, closed al-Sha'b and placed Husrieh under 24-hour surveillance. Husrieh retaliated by issuing a secret pamphlet entitled al-Istifham(Question mark) that criticized the National Bloc and its entire leadership, accusing them of establishing a dictatorship in Syria. In 1942, following the death of Shahbandar, Husrieh joined al-Istiqlal al-Arabi (Arab Independence), another anti-Bloc publication, and served as its editor-in-chief. In May 1944, Izzat Husrieh founded his own evening newspaper in Damascus called Al-Alam (The Flag), becoming editor-in-chief. When the Bloc achieved Syrian independence in 1946, Husrieh softened his criticism of them and allied himself with Bloc's successor, the National party. From 1944 to 1947, his career was supported by Prime Minister Saadallah al-Jabiri, who helped Husrieh to acquire the license of Al-Alam, until his death in 1947.

In the 1940s, Husrieh wrote for the popular Damascus daily, al-Qabas (The Firebrand). When Syria and Egypt merged to form the United Arab Republic (UAR) in February 1958, he criticized the government of President Gamal Abdel Nasser and hailed the coup that ousted the union in September 1961. From 1961 to 1963, he allied himself with the post-Nasser government of President Nazim al-Qudsi, who like Husrieh, had supported Shahbandar during his youth. In March 1963, the Military Committee of the Ba'ath Party came to power and pledged to restore the UAR. The officers closed Husrieh's newspaper, terminated his civil rights, and forced him into retirement. Husrieh remained in Syria and worked until 1970 as a publisher without writing any articles in the press.

== Community service ==
Husrieh also worked with an excavation team to renovate historical sites and contributed in building several mosques in Damascus. He co-founded a committee to help protect the old quarters of the Syrian capital and started up another committee to monitor human rights issues in Syrian prisons.

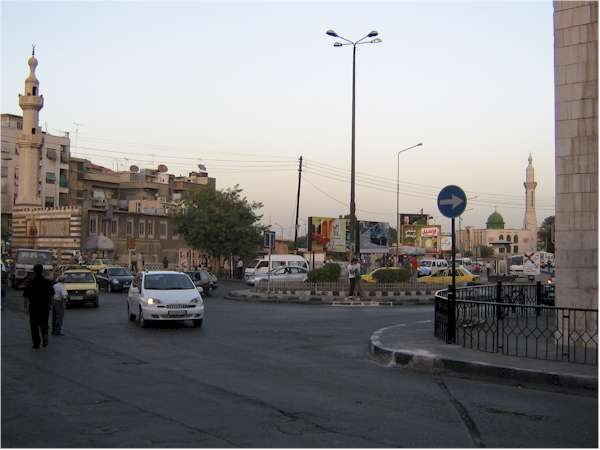
Sheikh Arslan Mosque in Damascus, site of Husrieh's burial

== Death ==
Izzat Husrieh died in Damascus on November 4, 1975.

== Selected works ==
"Shoruoh Resalat Al Sheikh Arslan" book cover

- Shoruoh Resalat Al Sheikh Arslan - Al Aref bil Lah Al Sheikh Ahmad Al Haron
