= Economy of Syria =

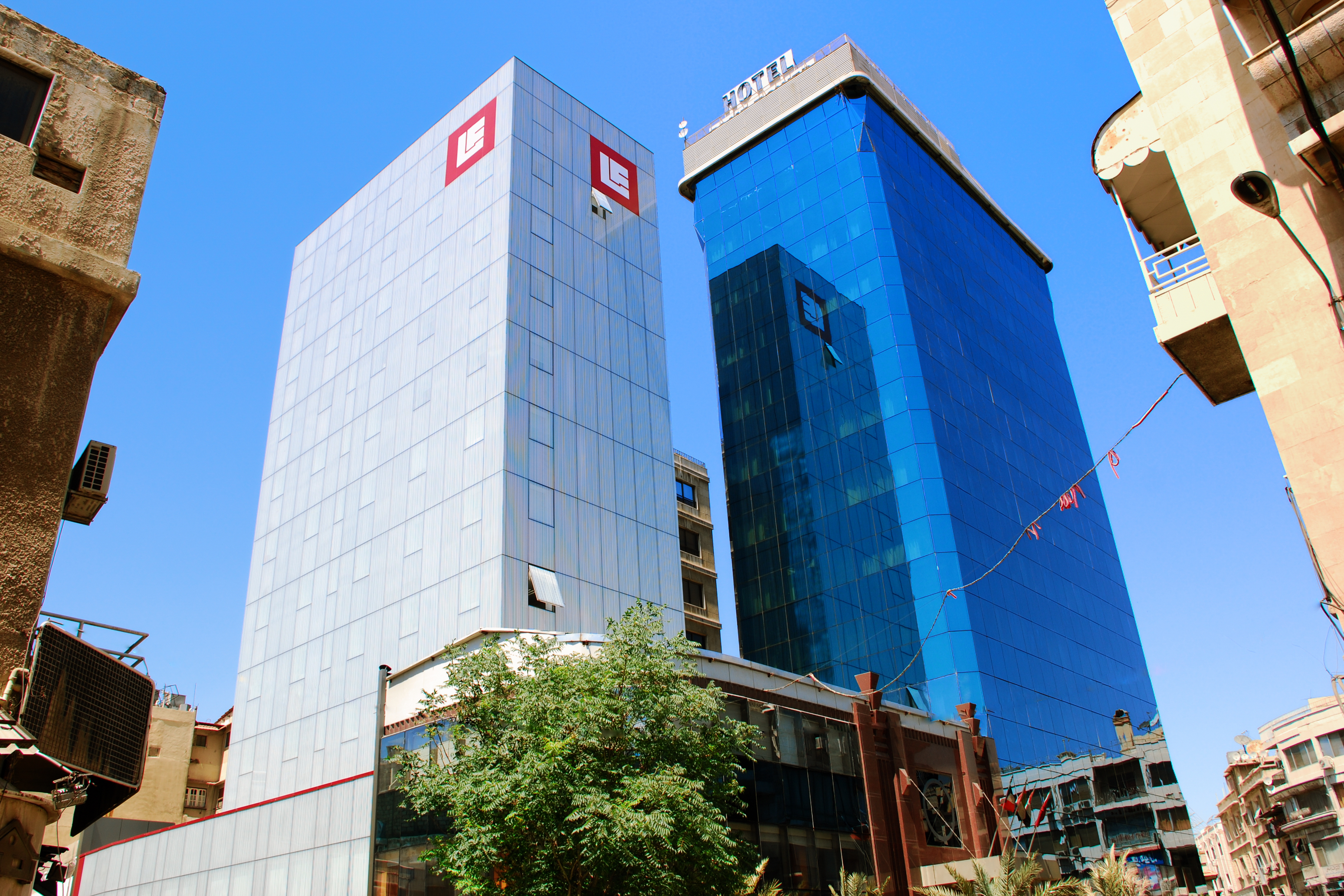
- Bank Al-Sharq and the Blue Tower Hotel in Damascus, 2010
- Currency: Syrian pound (SYP)
- Fiscal year: Calendar year
- Trade organisations: CAEU, GAFTA, G24, G77, World Bank, IMF
- Country group: Developing/Emerging; Lower-middle income economy; Lower income economy

Statistics
- Population: ▲26,019,711
- GDP: ▲$65 billion (nominal; 2026 est.) ▲$127.5 billion (PPP; 2026 est.)
- GDP rank: 105th (nominal, 2022); 85th (PPP, 2022)
- GDP growth: ▲2% (2025 est.)
- GDP per capita: $1,772 (PPP; 2026)
- GDP by sector: agriculture: 10.49%; industry: 26.51%; services: 63.0%; (2017 est.)
- Inflation (CPI): ▼24.8% (2025 est.)
- Population below national poverty line: 90.5% (2026 est.)
- Human Development Index: ▲0.575 medium (2026) (159th); N/A IHDI (2022)
- Labour force: ▲8,437,197 (2026)
- Labour force by occupation: agriculture: 17%; industry: 16%; services: 67% (2008 est.)
- Unemployment: ▲14% (2026) (Note: modeled ILO estimate)
- Youth unemployment: ▲33.1% (2025)
- Main industries: Petroleum, textiles, food processing, beverages, tobacco, phosphate rock mining, cement, oil seeds crushing, car assembly

External
- Exports: ▼$1.11 billion (2024)
- Export goods: olive oil, spices, barley, nuts, cotton, tomatoes, soap, phosphates, cumin seeds, pistachios, glass, cleaning products, apples, pears, potatoes, and some pitted fruits (2024)
- Main export partners: Turkey 39.30%; Saudi Arabia 16.38%; Lebanon 12.01%; India 5.62%; Kuwait 4.59%; Egypt 4.23%; Spain 3.79%; Serbia 3.53%; Germany 1.48%; Italy 1.37% (2024)
- Imports: ▼$3.87 billion (2024)
- Import goods: cigarettes, tobacco, raw sugar, motor vehicles, broadcasting equipment, wheat flours, sunflower oil, liquefied petroleum gas, associated petroleum gas, refined petroleum, coffee and rice (2024)
- Main import partners: Turkey 56.35%; Egypt 10.46%; China 9.98%; Saudi Arabia 3.84%; Lebanon 2.62%; Brazil 1.78%; India 1.68%; Argentina 1.63%; Italy 1.29%; Germany 1.10% (2024)
- Gross external debt: ▲$18 billion (2026 est.)

Public finance
- Government debt: ▲35% of GDP (2026 est.)
- Foreign reserves: ▼$500 million (1 March 2026 est.)
- Revenue: $10.5 billion (2026 est.)
- Spending: ▼$2.1 billion (2021 est.)
- Economic aid: humanitarian aid $7.7 billion (2020 est.)
- All values, unless otherwise stated, are in US dollars.

The economy of Syria is a developing mixed economy. It was primarily based on agriculture in the country's early years, though it deteriorated after the start of the Syrian civil war in March 2011.

In 2026, Syria's economy began a notable recovery, with gross domestic product projected to grow by nearly 10 percent, approximately double the rate of the previous year. The improvement has been attributed to the easing of sanctions, improved security conditions, and the return of skilled professionals to the country. Investment in infrastructure and the energy sector by regional partners has also contributed to the projected expansion.

== History ==
Since the establishment of the First Syrian Republic in 1946, the economy has undergone many structural and other changes. Although the presence of the Allied forces during World War II stimulated commerce by providing markets for agriculture, textiles, and other locally manufactured goods, Syria lacked both the infrastructure and the resources to achieve economic prosperity. Agriculture, which had played a key role in the economy, became a factor in industrial expansion as landowners channeled profits from agricultural exports into agroindustrial and related urban enterprises. The population, working under land tenure and sharecropping arrangements, derived few benefits from the agriculturally induced economic growth of the 1950s. However, Syria's union with Egypt (1958–61) and the rise of the Baath Party as the major political force in the country in the 1960s, transformed Syria's economic orientation and development strategy.

Historical development of real GDP per capita in Syria, since 1820

=== 1960s–1970s: State-led development ===
By the mid-1960s, government-sponsored land reform and nationalization of major industries and foreign investments had confirmed the new socialist direction of Syria's economic policy. As the state assumed greater control over economic decision-making by adopting centralized planning and strictly regulating commercial transactions, Syria experienced a substantial loss of skilled workers, administrators, and their capital. Despite the political upheavals, which undermined the confidence of landowners, merchants, and industrialists, the state successfully implemented large-scale development projects to expand industry, agriculture, and infrastructure.

During the 1970s, Syria achieved high rates of economic growth. The dramatic rise of world oil prices from 1973 to 1974 led to increased production from domestic refineries. Moreover, higher prices for agricultural and oil exports, as well as the state's limited economic liberalization policy, encouraged growth. Also, Syria's economic boom was furthered by increased remittances from Syrians working in the oil-rich Arab states and higher levels of Arab and other foreign aid. By the end of the decade, the Syrian economy had shifted from its traditional agrarian base to an economy dominated by the service, industrial, and commercial sectors. Massive expenditures for development of irrigation, electricity, water, road building projects, irisin plants and expansion of health services and education to rural areas contributed to prosperity. However, the economy remained dependent on foreign aid and grants to finance the growing deficits both in the budget and in trade. Syria, as a front-line state in the Arab-Israeli conflict, was also vulnerable to the vagaries of Middle East politics, relying on Arab aid transfers and Soviet assistance to support mounting defense expenditures.

=== 1980s: Crisis and austerity ===
By the mid-1980s, the country's economic climate had shifted from prosperity to austerity. Syria's economic boom collapsed as a result of the rapid fall of world oil prices, lower export revenues, drought affecting agricultural production, and falling worker remittances. Also, Arab aid levels decreased because of economic retrenchment in the oil-producing states and Syrian support for Iran in the Iran-Iraq War. Real per capita GDP fell 22% between 1982 and 1989. To restore the economy, the government sharply reduced spending, cut back imports, encouraged more private sector and foreign investment, and launched an anticorruption campaign against smugglers and black-market money changers. However, massive defense outlays continued to divert resources from productive investments.

By the late 1980s, spot shortages of basic commodities occurred frequently, and industry operated far below capacity because of routine power outages. Foreign exchange reserves plummeted, the trade deficit widened, and real gross domestic product growth fell as economic difficulties compounded. Although the government instituted limited reforms to respond to the burgeoning crisis, Syria's pressing economic problems required a radically restructured economic policy to improve future economic performance.

=== 1990s–2000s: Liberalization and privatization ===
In 1990, the Assad government instituted a series of economic reforms, although the economy remained highly regulated. The Syrian economy experienced strong growth throughout the 1990s, and into the 2000s. Syria's per capita GDP was US$4,058 in 2010. There is no authoritative GDP data available after 2012, due to Syria's civil war.

Following his assumption of power in 2000, Bashar al-Assad sought to frame his leadership around modernizing and opening the economy. He emphasized, in particular, "the need to modernize the regulatory environment and the industrial base, activate and encourage the private sector, remove bureaucratic obstacles to investment, increase job opportunities, qualify cadres, improve education and expand information technology." While the government's economic liberal reforms indeed contributed to ramping up trade and invigorating the private sector, these were accompanied by rising inequality, declining public services, and increasingly overt forms of corruption, which ultimately helped fuel protests in 2011. In one example of this trend, the Syrian Agricultural Workers Union complained in February 2011 that state mismanagement and the lifting of input subsidies was exacerbating the impact of drought on Syria's agricultural sector.

Before the civil war, the two main pillars of the Syrian economy were agriculture and oil, which together accounted for about one-half of GDP. Agriculture, for instance, accounted for about 26% of GDP and employed 25% of the total labor force. However, poor climatic conditions and severe drought badly affected the agricultural sector, reducing its share in the economy to about 17% of 2008 GDP, down from 20.4% in 2007, according to preliminary data from the Central Bureau of Statistics. On the other hand, higher crude oil prices countered declining oil production and led to higher budgetary and export receipts.

=== 2011–2024: Syria's civil war ===
Since the outbreak of the Syrian civil war, the Syrian economy has been affected by economic sanctions restricting trade with the Arab League, Australia, Canada, the European Union, (as well as the European countries of Albania, Iceland, Liechtenstein, Moldova, Montenegro, North Macedonia, Norway, Serbia, and Switzerland), Georgia, Japan, South Korea, Taiwan, Turkey, and the United States. Sanctions against Syria were further extended by the US Caesar Syria Civilian Protection Act that came into force in June 2020.

The destruction and dislocation associated with the civil war have devastated Syria's economy. By the end of 2013, the UN estimated total economic damage from the Syrian civil war at $143 billion. In 2018, the World Bank estimated that about one-third of Syria's housing stock and one half of its health and education facilities have been destroyed by the conflict. According to the World Bank, a cumulative total of $226 billion in GDP was lost due to the conflict from 2011 to 2016.

The Syrian economy suffered from conflict-related hyperinflation. The Syrian annual inflation rate is one of the highest in the world. The national currency, the Syrian pound, tumbled in mid-2020 against the US dollar, therefore stating that Syrian economy was only taking a turn for the worse. The pound, which traded at LS 47 to the dollar before the 2011 uprising, plunged to over LS 3,000 to the dollar. Prices of basic goods have skyrocketed and some staples have disappeared from the market as merchants and the public struggled to keep up with the rising cost of living.

In 2022, Syria joined the Chinese Belt and Road Initiative, which could help the country rebuild its war-torn infrastructure and economy. Following the end of Bashar Al-asad regime and the civil war, the interim government appointed for the first time in history a woman as governor of the central bank. Maysaa Sabreen was announced as the new governor on 30 December 2024. 20 days before on 10 December Basel Abdul Hannan became Minister of the Economy, In his new role, he announced plans to implement market liberalization reforms, including dismantling the existing import-export control system and moving toward a free-market economic model. During a meeting with the Damascus Chambers of Commerce, he outlined plans to remove restrictions on imports and allow registered businesses to trade more freely.

=== 2024–present: Transitional government ===
After the fall of the Assad regime in December 2024, countries began lifting economic sanctions that were put in place against Ba'athist Syria. In May 2025, the EU lifted all sanctions on Syria while US President Donald Trump signed an executive order that did the same in June.

Since taking office, Syrian president Ahmed al-Sharaa has stated that the Syrian transitional government will reform the energy sector for sustainability and reliable electricity, support farmers to ensure food production, revive the industry, protect national products, attract investment, stabilize the economy, strengthen the Syrian pound, and prevent financial manipulation. He also announced that he intends to revalue the Syrian pound by removing two zeros and issuing new banknotes by the end of 2025.

In November 2025, the International Monetary Fund sent a technical group to visit Damascus and assess the economic recovery in Syria. The group concluded that Syria shows signs of recovery and improvements, but there is a lack of reliable economic data. The IMF reiterated its commitment to supporting Syria's authorities in rehabilitating Syria's economy and economic institutions. In December, Abdulkader Husrieh, the head of the Central Bank of Syria, announced that economic recovery in the country is exceeding the 1% expectation from the World Bank with the return of an estimated 1.5 million refugees.

In December 2024, the head of the Damascus Chamber of Commerce, Bassel Hamwi, declared that the Syrian economy would transition to "a free-market system based on competition." The Syrian government's liberalisation of trade resulted in increasing dependence on Turkey, as Syrian imports from Turkey rose 60% from 2024 while Syrian exports to Turkey declined by half. This has resulted in industrialists in Syria expressing frustration at the government over a growing trade deficit with Turkey.

== Basic information ==
During the 1960s, along socialist lines, the government nationalized most major enterprises and adopted economic policies designed to address regional and class disparities. Economic reform has been incremental and gradual. In 2001, private banking in Syria has been legalized. In 2004, four private banks began operations. In August 2004, a committee was formed to supervise the establishment of a stock market. Beyond the financial sector, the Syrian Government has enacted major changes to rental and tax laws, and is reportedly considering similar changes to the commercial code and to other laws, which impact property rights.

Syria produced heavy-grade oil from fields inside in the northeast since the late 1960s. In the early 1980s, light-grade, low-sulphur oil was discovered near Deir ez-Zor in eastern Syria. This discovery relieved Syria of the need to import light oil to mix with domestic heavy crude in refineries. As the war erupted in 2011, Syria's oil production had dropped to 353,000 bpd and then plunged to 24,000 bpd by 2018. Syria's oil reserves have been gradually depleted and reached an estimated 2.5 billion barrels of oil reserves in 2018.

In 1990, the government established an official parallel exchange rate to provide incentives for remittances and exports through official channels. This action improved the supply of basic commodities and contained inflation by removing risk premiums on smuggled commodities.

Foreign aid to Syria in 1997 totaled an estimated US$199 million. The World Bank reported that in July 2004, it had committed a total of US$661 million for 20 operations in Syria. One investment project remained active at that time.

Year	Gross Domestic Product	US Dollar Exchange	Inflation Index (2000=100)	Per Capita Income (as % of USA)	Population
1980	78,270	£S 3.94	8.10	12.17	8,971,343
1985	146,225	£S 3.92	14	11.64	10,815,289
1990	268,328	£S 28.80	57	4.37	12,720,920
1995	570,975	£S 35.30	98	4.18	14,610,348
2000	903,944	£S 49.68	100	3.49	16,510,861
2005	1,677,417	£S 56.09	122	3.70	19,121,454
2010	59,633,000	£S 47.00	4.40%	5.79	21,092,262

== External trade and investment ==
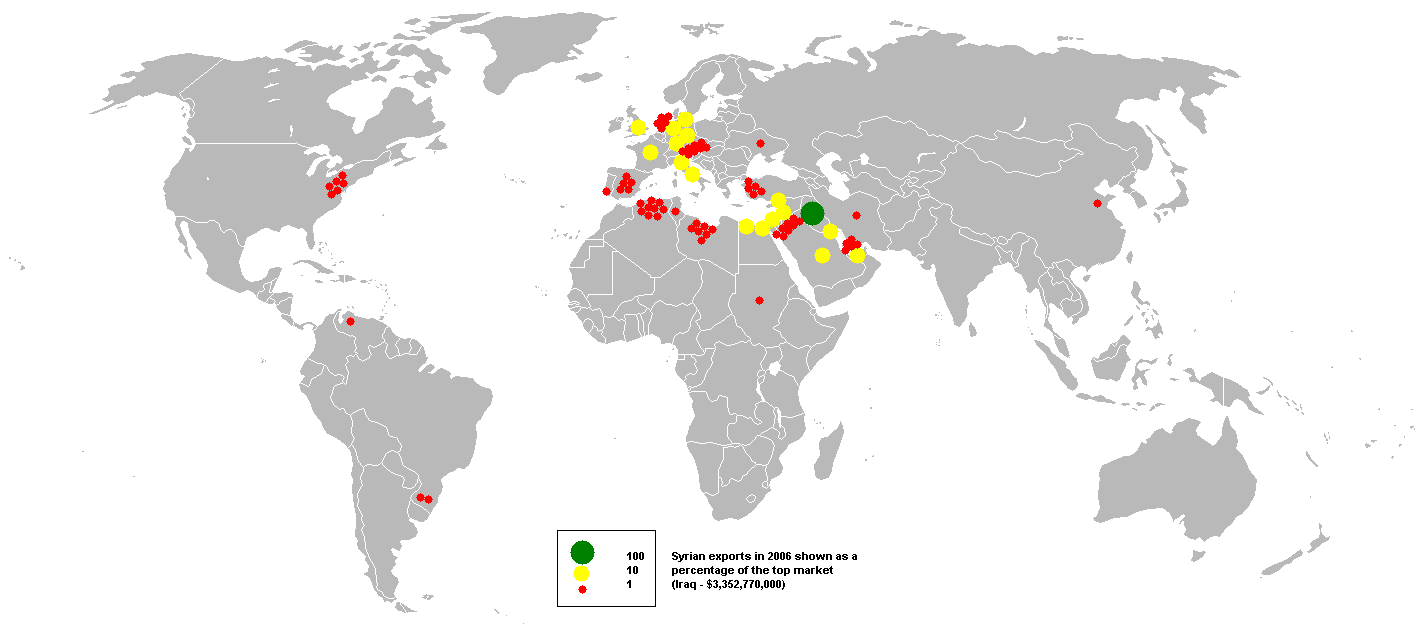
Syrian exports in 2006

Exports of Syria by product category (2019) Chemical products Transportation Machines Mineral products Plastics and rubbers Metals Foodstuffs Precious metals Textiles Instruments Animal products Vegetable products Paper goods Footwear and headwear Miscellaneous Stone and glass Wood products Animal and vegetable bi-products Animal hides Arts and antiques Weapons

Despite the mitigation of the severe drought that plagued the region in the late 1990s and the recovery of energy export revenues, Syria's economy has historically faced serious challenges.

Commerce has always been important to the Syrian economy, which benefited from the country's strategic location along major east–west trade routes. Syrian cities boast both traditional industries such as weaving and dried-fruit packing and modern heavy industry. Given the policies adopted from the 1960s through the late 1980s, Syria refused to join the "global economy". In late 2001, however, Syria submitted a request to the World Trade Organization (WTO) to begin the accession process. Syria had been an original contracting party of the former General Agreement on Tariffs and Trade but withdrew in 1951 because of Israel's joining. Major elements of current Syrian trade rules would have to change in order to be consistent with the WTO. In March 2007, Syria signed an Association Agreement with the European Union that would encourage both sides to negotiate a free trade agreement before 2010.

The bulk of Syrian imports have been raw materials essential for industry, agriculture, equipment, and machinery. Major exports include crude oil, refined products, raw cotton, clothing, fruits, and cereal grains.

Over time, the government has increased the number of transactions to which the more favorable neighboring country exchange rate applies. The government also introduced a quasi-rate for non-commercial transactions in 2001 broadly in line with prevailing black market rates.

Given the poor development of its own capital markets and Syria's lack of access to international money and capital markets, monetary policy remains captive to the need to cover the fiscal deficit. Although in 2003 Syria lowered interest rates for the first time in 22 years and again in 2004, rates remain fixed by law.

As of 2012, because of the ongoing Syrian civil war, the value of Syria's overall exports has been slashed by two-thirds, from the figure of US$12 billion in 2010 to only US$4 billion in 2012. Syria's GDP declined by over 3% in 2011.

=== Debt ===
Under Syrian President Bashar Assad, national debt in relation to GDP went from 152.09% in 2000 down to 30.02% in 2010. Prior to the civil war, Syria attempted to ease its heavy foreign debt burden through bilateral rescheduling deals with virtually all of its key creditors in Europe, including Germany, France, and Russia. In December 2004, Syria and Poland reached an agreement by which Syria would pay $27 million out of the total $261.7 million debt. In January 2005, Russia and Syria signed a deal that wrote off nearly 75% of Syria's debt to Russia, approximately $13 billion. The agreement left Syria with less than €3 billion (just over $3.6 billion) owed to Moscow. Half of it would be repaid over the next 10 years, while the rest would be paid into Russian accounts in Syrian banks and could be used for Russian investment projects in Syria and for buying Syrian products. Later that year, Syria reached an agreement with Slovakia and the Czech Republic to settle an estimated $1.6 billion in debt, in exchange for a one time payment of $150 million.

== Sectors of the economy ==
=== Agriculture ===
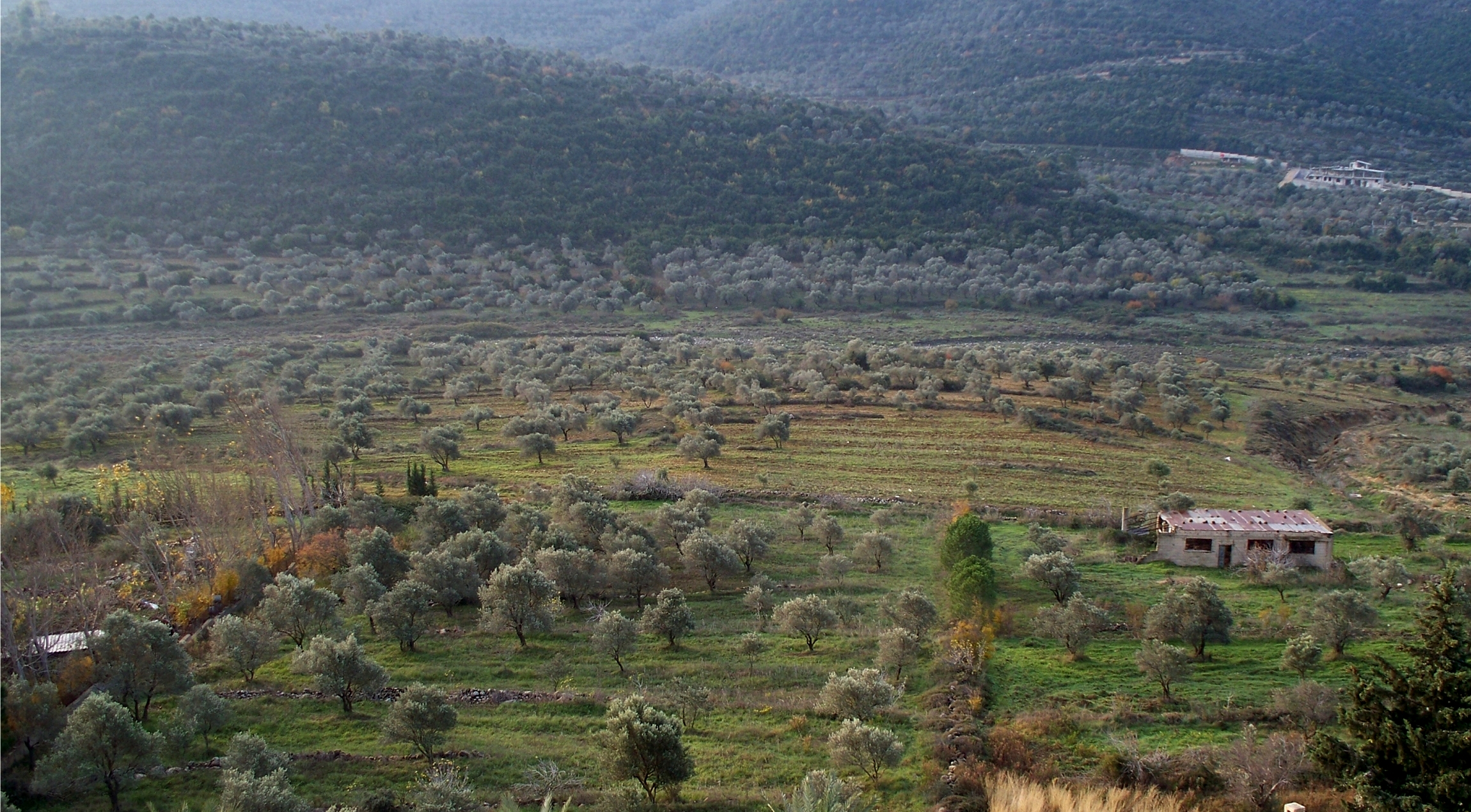
Olive groves in Western-Syria, Homs Governorate.

Agriculture is a high priority in Syria's economic development plans, as the government seeks to achieve food self-sufficiency, increase export earnings, and halt rural out-migration. Thanks to sustained capital investment, infrastructure development, subsidies of inputs, and price supports, before the civil war Syria went from a net importer of many agricultural products to an exporter of cotton, fruits, vegetables, and other foodstuffs. One of the prime reasons for this turnaround was the government's investment in huge irrigation systems in northern and northeastern Syria. The agriculture sector, as of 2009, employed about 17% of the labor force and generates about 21% of the gross domestic product, of which livestock accounted for 16%, and fruit and grains for more than 40%.

In 2015, Syria's main exports included spice seeds ($83.2 million), apples and pears ($53.2 million).

Most land is privately owned, a crucial factor behind the sector's success. Of Syria's 196,000 km^{2} (76,000 sq mi), about 28% of it is cultivated, and 21% of that total is irrigated. Most irrigated land is designated "strategic", meaning that it encounters significant state intervention in terms of pricing, subsidies, and marketing controls. "Strategic" products such as wheat, barley, and sugar beets, must be sold to state marketing boards at fixed prices, often above world prices in order to support farmers, but at a significant cost to the state budget. The most widely grown arable crop is wheat, but the most important cash crop is cotton; cotton was the largest single export before the development of the oil sector. Nevertheless, the total area planted with cotton has declined because of an increasing problem of water shortage coupled with old and inefficient irrigation techniques. The output of grains like wheat is often underutilized because of poor storage facilities.

Water and energy are among the most pervasive issues facing the agriculture sector. Another difficulty suffered by the agricultural sector is the government's decision to liberalize prices of fertilizers, which increased between 100% and 400%. Drought was an alarming problem in 2008; however, the drought situation slightly improved in 2009. Wheat and barley production about doubled in 2009 compared to 2008. In spite of that, the livelihoods of up to 1 million agricultural workers have been threatened. In response, the UN launched an emergency appeal for $20.2 million. Wheat has been one of the crops most affected, and for the first time in 2 decades Syria has moved from being a net exporter of wheat to a net importer. During the civil war which began in 2011, the Syrian government was forced to put out a tender for 100,000 metric tonnes of wheat, one of the few trade products not subject to economic sanctions.

Less than 2.7% of Syria's land area is forested, and only a portion of that is commercially useful. Limited forestry activity is centered in the higher elevations of the mountains just inland from the coast, where rainfall is more abundant.

=== Energy and mineral resources ===
==== Mining ====
Phosphates are the major minerals exploited in Syria. According to estimates Syria has around 1,700 million tons of phosphate reserves. Production dropped sharply in the early 1990s when world demand and prices fell, but output has since increased to more than 2.4 million tons. Syria produced about 1.9% of the world's phosphate rock output and was the world's ninth ranked producer of phosphate rock in 2009. Other major minerals produced in Syria include cement, gypsum, industrial sand (silica), marble, natural crude asphalt, nitrogen fertilizer, phosphate fertilizer, salt, steel, and volcanic tuff, which generally are not produced for export.

==== Oil and natural gas ====
Syria is a relatively small oil producer, accounting for just 0.5% of global production in 2010. Although Syria is not a major oil exporter by Middle Eastern standards, oil is a major pillar of the economy. According to the International Monetary Fund, oil sales for 2010 were projected to generate $3.2 billion for the Syrian government and account for 25.1% of the state's revenue.

According to the 2009 Syria Report of the Oxford Business Group, the oil sector accounted for 23% of government revenues, 20% of exports and 22% of GDP in 2008. Syria exported roughly 150,000 bpd in 2008, and oil accounted for a majority of the country's export income.

==== Electricity ====
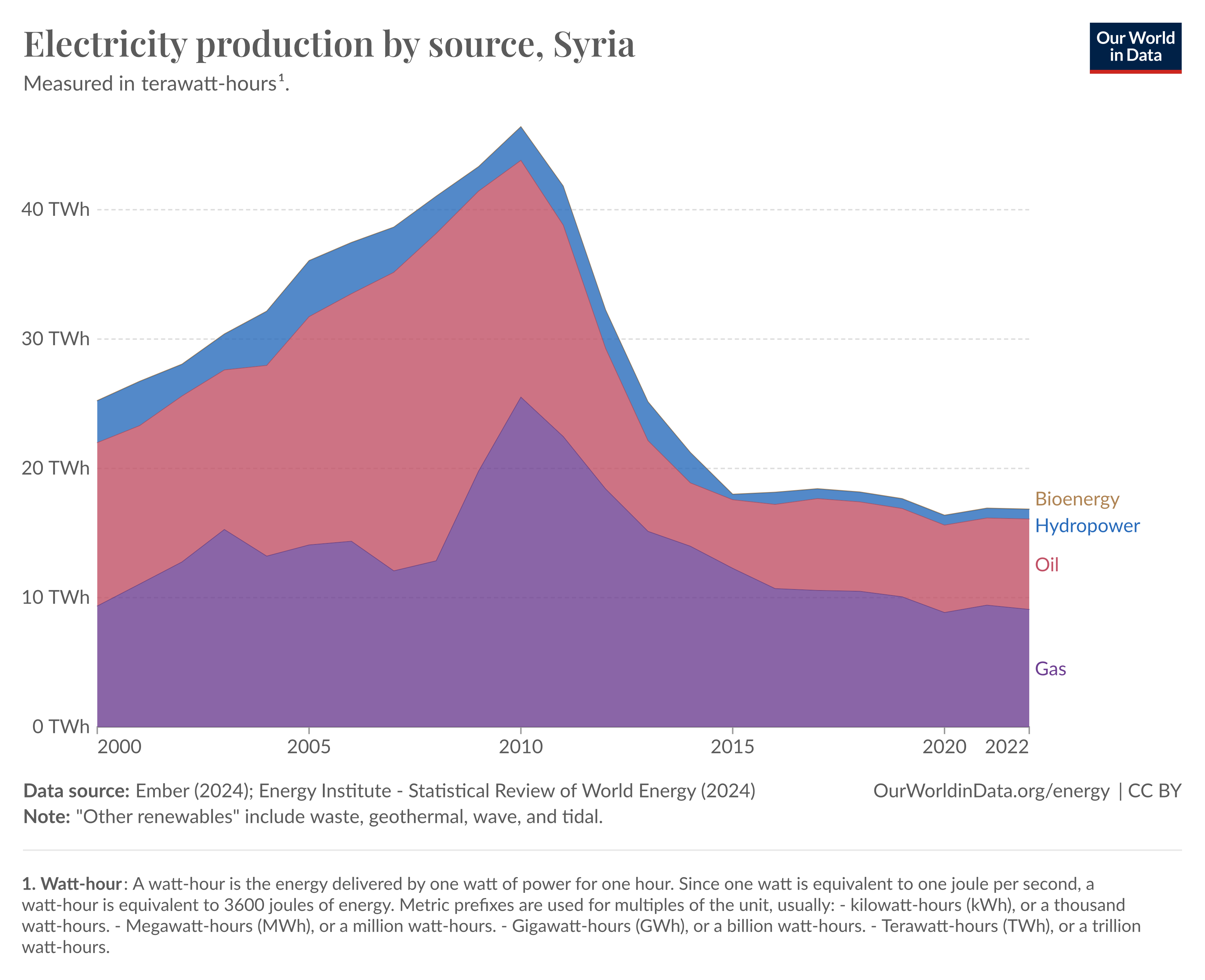
Electricity generation in Syria by source

According to the International Energy Agency in 2022 almost all electricity was generated from oil and fossil gas, like energy in Syria. But according to Anadolu Agency as of 2024 most generation is hydro. In 2024 electricity grids needed war damage to be repaired. As of 2024 generation by power stations in Syria cannot meet demand, resulting in power cuts and air pollution from small diesel generators. The Ministry of Electricity aims to increase generating capacity to 12 GW by 2030. As the country has plenty of sunshine, solar power could be expanded.

=== Industry and manufacturing ===
The industrial sector, which includes mining, manufacturing, construction, and petroleum, accounted for 27.3 percent of gross domestic product (GDP) in 2010 and employed about 16 percent of the labor force. The main industrial products are petroleum, textiles, food processing, beverages, tobacco, phosphate rock mining, cement, oil seeds crushing, and car assembly. Syria's manufacturing sector was largely state dominated until the 1990s, when economic reforms allowed greater local and foreign private-sector participation. Private participation remains constrained, however, by the lack of investment funds, input/output pricing limits, cumbersome customs and foreign exchange regulations, and poor marketing.

==== Construction ====
Because land prices are not controlled by the state, real estate is one of the few domestic avenues for investment with realistic and safe returns. Activity in the construction sector tends to mirror changes in the economy. Investment Law No. 10 of 1991, which opened the country to foreign investment in some areas, marked the beginning of a strong revival, with growth in real terms increasing over 2001 and 2002.

==== Drug exports ====
As of 2022, captagon was Ba'athist Syria's most valuable export product and a key source of income for the Assad regime. The total value of drug shipments sold in 2021 were approximately $5.7 billion. Those were mostly dismantled by the new Syrian caretaker government in January 2025.

=== Services ===
Services accounted for 60.4% of gross domestic product (GDP) in 2017 and employed 67% of the labor force, including government, in 2008. In May 2009, it was reported that Damascus office prices were skyrocketing.

==== Banking and finance ====
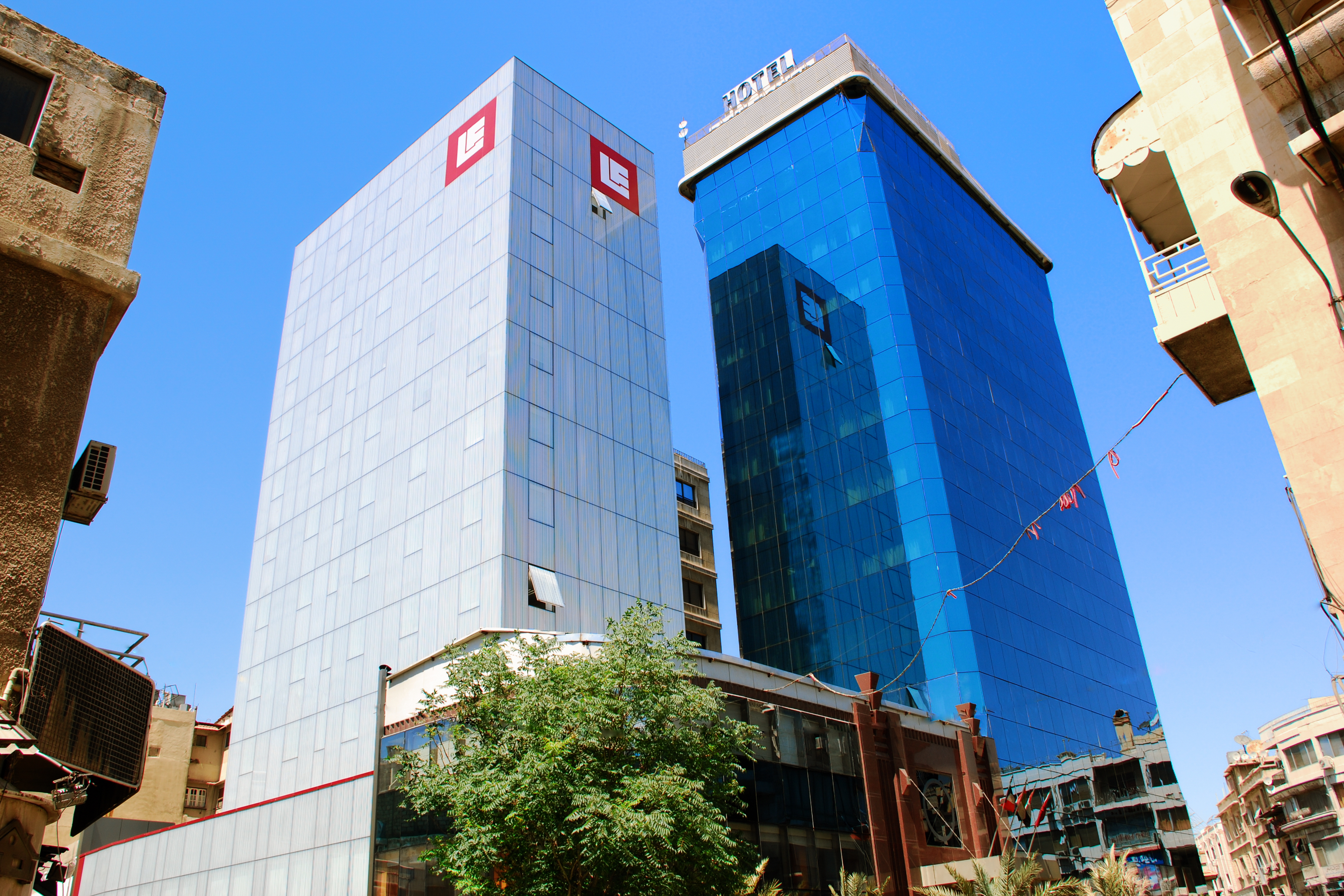
Bank Al-Sharq and the Blue Tower Hotel in Damascus

The Central Bank of Syria began operations in 1959. It controls all foreign exchange and trade transactions and gives priority to lending to the public sector. The Central Bank has been subject to US sanctions since May 2004, which has accused the Bank of money laundering. These US sanctions may have increased the role of Lebanese and European banks because a ban on transactions between U.S. financial institutions and the Central Bank of Syria created an increase in demand for intermediary sources for US$ transfers. The United States, European Union, Arab League and Turkey all also imposed sanctions on the Central Bank because of the Civil War.

The six specialized state-owned banks – the Central Bank of Syria, Commercial Bank of Syria, Agricultural Co-Operative Bank, Industrial Bank, Popular Credit Bank, and Real Estate Bank – are major financial operators. They each extend funds to, and take deposits from, a particular sector. The Industrial Bank also is directed more toward the public sector, although it is under-capitalized. As a result, the private sector often is forced to bank abroad, a process that is more expensive and therefore a poor solution to industrial financing needs. Many business people travel abroad to deposit or borrow funds. It is estimated that Syrians have deposited US$6 billion in Lebanese banks.

In the 2000s, Syria started reforms in the financial sector, including the introduction of private banks and the opening of the Damascus Securities Exchange in March 2009. In 2001, Syria legalized private banks and the sector, while still nascent, has been growing. Foreign banks were given licenses in December 2002, under Law 28 March 2001 which allows the establishment of private and joint-venture banks. Foreigners are allowed up to 49% ownership of a bank, but may not hold a controlling stake. As of January 2010, 13 private banks had opened, including two Islamic banks.

Syria took gradual steps to loosen controls over foreign exchange. In 2003, the government canceled a law that criminalized private sector use of foreign currencies, and in 2005 it allowed licensed private banks to sell specific amounts of foreign currency to Syrian citizens under certain circumstances and to the private sector to finance imports. In October 2009, Syria further loosened its restrictions on currency transfers by allowing Syrians travelling abroad to withdraw the equivalent of up to US$10,000 from their Syrian pound accounts. In practice, the decision allows local banks to open accounts of a maximum of US$10,000 that their clients can use for their international payment cards. The holders of these accounts will be able to withdraw up to US$10,000 per month while travelling abroad.

To attract investment and to ease access to credit, the government allowed investors in 2007 to receive loans and other credit instruments from foreign banks, and to repay the loans and any accrued interest through local banks using project proceeds. In February 2008, the government permitted investors to receive loans in foreign currencies from local private banks to finance capital investments. Syria's exchange rate is fixed, and the government maintains two official rates—one rate on which the budget and the value of imports, customs, and other official transactions are based, and a second set by the Central Bank on a daily basis that covers all other financial transactions. The government passed a law in 2006 which permits the operation of private money exchange companies. However, there is still a small black market for foreign currency.

Since the start of the Syrian civil war in 2011, there has been a capital flight to nearby countries. Syria has been subject to sanctions by United States, Canada, European Union, Arab League and Turkey because of the civil war. The currency of Syria is the Syrian pound (SYP). The pound's official exchange rate has deteriorated significantly, falling from £S 47 for US$1 before the civil war to £S 1,256 as in June 2020. On another hand, while its exchange rate for money transfer is £S 1,250 for US$1, its non-official exchange rate (black market) plunged to around £S 4,000 for US$1 in March 2021.

==== Education ====
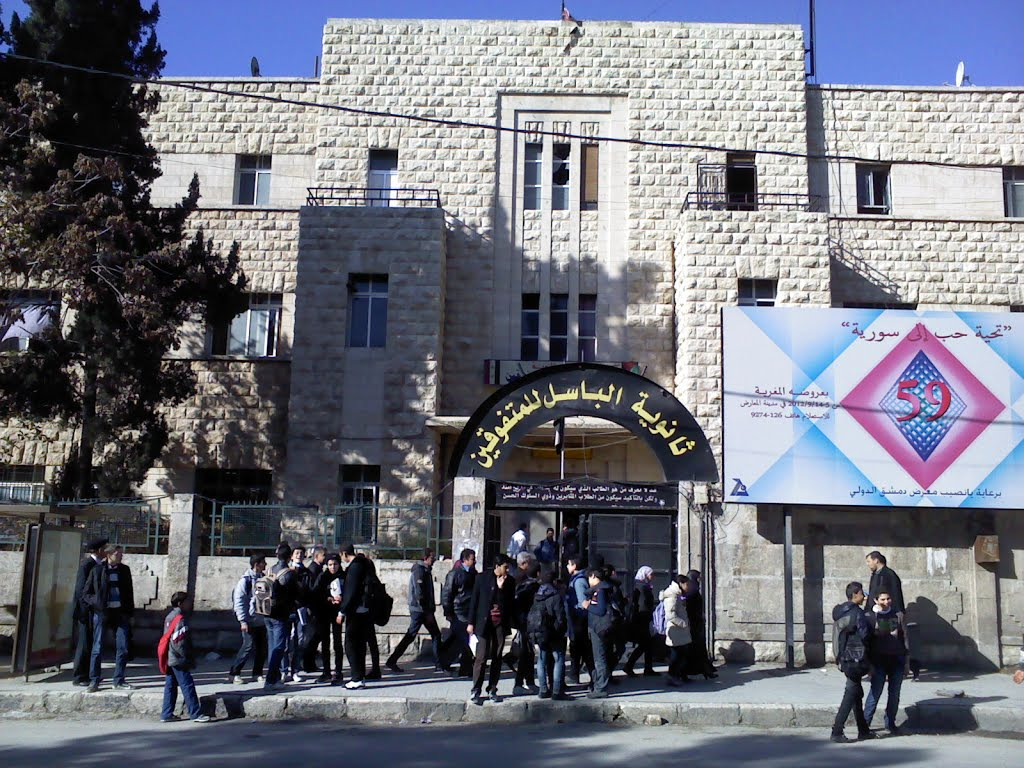
High School in Aleppo

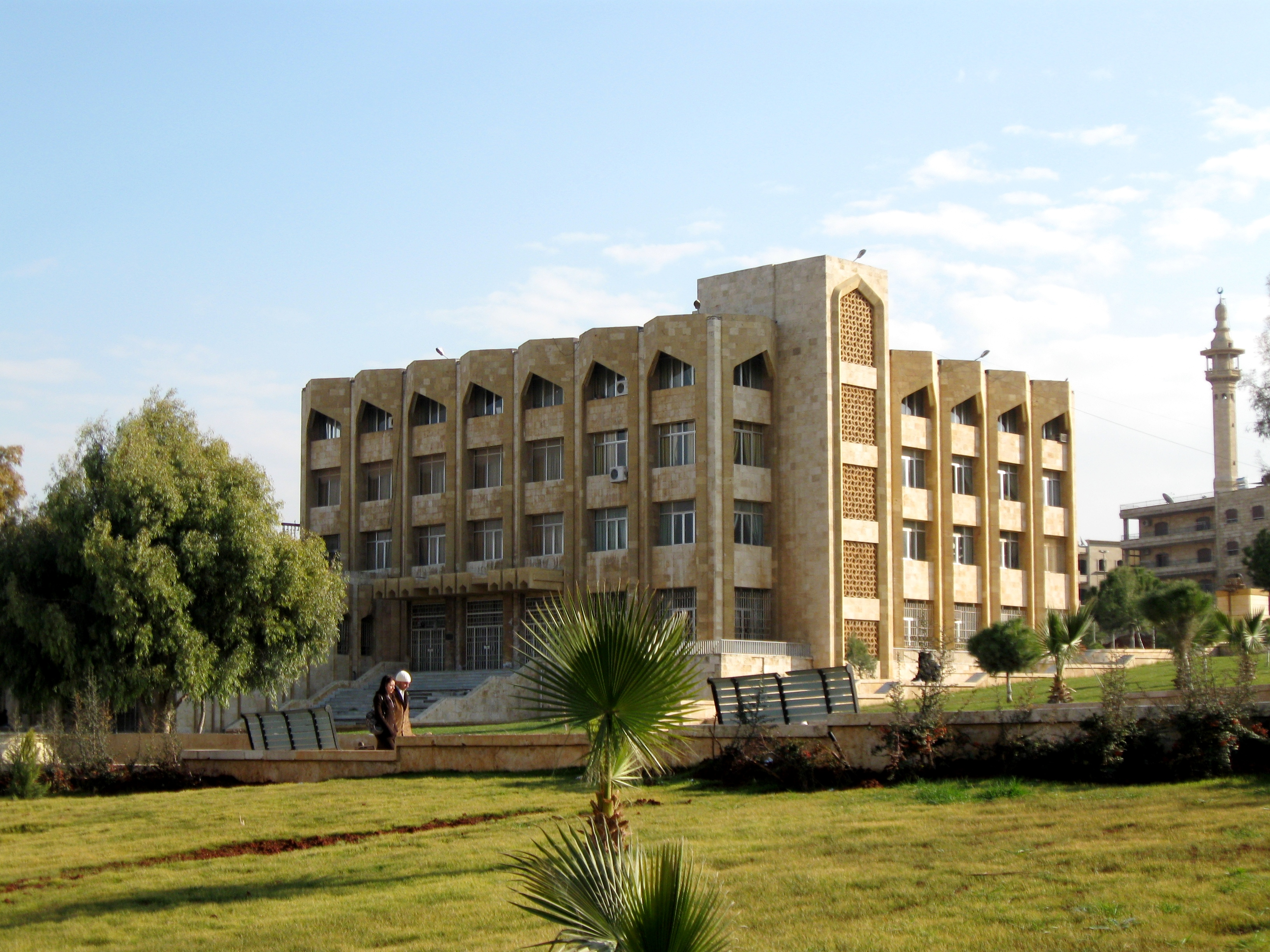
University of Aleppo

Education in the Syrian Arab Republic is given the necessary attention and care by the Syrian state, as the Constitution of Syria guarantees the right to education to every citizen, which is compulsory and free at primary level. It is free but not compulsory at the secondary level and higher education is available for a symbolic fee. the primary level includes 3 stages, 1 which include grades 1 to 6, while 2 (middle school) includes grades 7 to 9, and lastly 3 (secondary school) grades 10 to 12.

According to the 2007 census, 98 percent of schools in Syria were public (state run), 1.8 percent were private, and 0.2 percent were UNRWA schools for children who are refugees.

In 2007, there were 8 million students in the education system of Syria (4 million in basic education, 1.4 million in secondary and 2.3 million in tertiary). Given the current growth rate in the school age population, it is projected that by 2015, the education system in Syria will need to cater to an additional 1 million students in basic and secondary education.

The school system in Syria is divided into basic and secondary education levels:

- 1st to 6th grade: Primary Education Level. From 1st to 4th grade, it’s called the First Ring (Arabic: حلقة أولى; halaka oula) while 5th & 6th grade are called Second Ring (Arabic: حلقة ثانية; halaka thania)
- 7th to 9th grade: Pre-Secondary Education Level (Arabic: تعليم إعدادي; taelim 'edady )
- 10th to 12th grade: Upper Secondary Education (Arabic: تعليم ثانوي; taelim thanawi), which is the equivalent of High School.

Higher Education is the responsibility of the Ministry of Higher Education and Scientific Research.

==== Healthcare ====
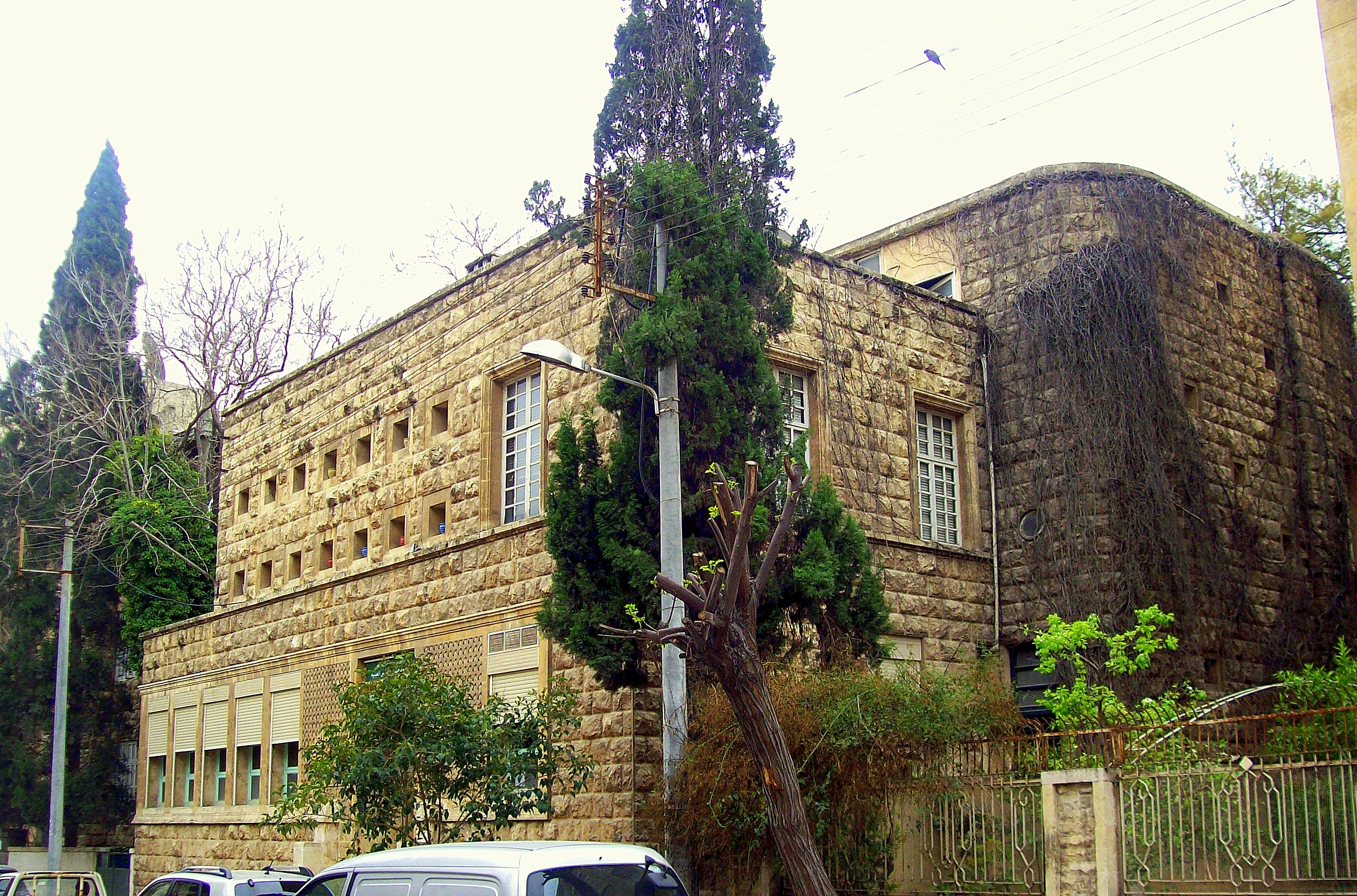
Robert Jebejian Ophthalmological Hospital in Aleppo, Syria, founded in 1952

Although emphasized by the country's ruling Baath Party and improving significantly in recent years, health in Syria has been declining due to the ongoing civil war. The war which has left 60% of the population food insecure and saw the collapse of the Syrian economy, the surging prices of basic needs, the plummeting of the Syrian pound, the destruction of many hospitals nationwide, the deterioration in the functionality of some medical equipment due to the lack of spare parts and maintenance, and shortages of drugs and medical supplies due to sanctions and corruption.

==== Telecommunications ====
The Syrian Ministry of Communications and Information Technology retains governmental authority over the internet in Syria. Prior to the Syrian civil war, telecommunications in Syria were slowly moving towards liberalization, with a number of licenses awarded and services launched in the Internet service provision market. The initiative reflected the government's change in attitude towards liberalization, following its promise to the European Union to liberalize markets by 2010. All other forms of fixed-line communications are provided by the state-owned operator, Syrian Telecom (STE).

==== Tourism ====
Tourism in Syria has greatly reduced as a result of the Syrian civil war and its associated refugee crisis. Tourism has been further impacted by the outbreak of COVID-19 that started in March 2020. The international economic sanctions imposed on Syria and the sharp drop in the value of the Syrian pound also adversely impact tourism in Syria.

=== Transport ===
Transport in Syria is possible by rail, road, air or rivers, both public and private. Syria is an Asian country with a well-developed rail network (2,052 km (1,275 mi)) and a highway system (782 km (486 mi)).

Syria's main international airport is the Damascus International Airport in the capital, Damascus.

=== Water supply and sanitation ===
Syria is a semi-arid country with scarce water resources. The largest water-consuming sector in Syria is agriculture. Domestic water use is only about 9% of total water use.

A big challenge for Syria is its high population growth, with a rapidly increasing demand for urban and industrial water. In 2006, the population of Syria was 19.4 million with a growth rate of 2.7%.

== Labour ==
Syria has a population of approximately 26 million people, rising from a low of 19 million in 2016 during the civil war, with 65% of the population under the age of 35 and more than 40% under the age of 15. Each year more than 200,000 new job seekers enter the Syrian job market, but the economy has not been able to absorb them. In 2017, the Syrian labor force was estimated to total about 3.767 million people. An estimated 67 percent worked in the services sector including government, 17 percent in agriculture, and 16 percent in industry in 2008. Government and public sector employees constitute about 30% of the total labor force and are paid very low salaries and wages.

According to Syrian Government statistics, the unemployment rate in 2009 was 12.6%; however, more accurate independent sources place it closer to 20%. About 70 percent of Syria's workforce earns less than US$100 per month. Anecdotal evidence suggests that many more Syrians are seeking work over the border in Lebanon than official numbers indicate. In 2002 the Unemployment Commission (UC) was established, tasked with creating several hundred thousand jobs over a five-year period. As of June 2009 it was reported that some 700,000 households in Syria – about 3.5 million people – have no income. Government officials acknowledge that the economy is not growing at a pace sufficient to create enough new jobs annually to match population growth. The UN Development Programme (UNDP) announced in 2005 that 30% of the Syrian population lives in poverty and 11.4% live below the subsistence level.

The Ministry of Social Affairs and Labour is responsible for the labor market in Syria. During the Baathist era, the General Federation of Trade Unions (Syria) and the General Union of Peasants were the main labor unions permitted.

== Opportunity cost of conflict ==
A report by Strategic Foresight Group, an India-based think tank, calculated the opportunity cost of conflict for the Middle East for 1991–2010 at US$12 trillion in 2006 dollars. Syria's share in this was US$152 billion, more than four times the projected 2010 GDP of US$36 billion.

The Syrian Center for Policy Research stated in March 2015 that, by then, nearly three million Syrians had lost their jobs because of the civil war, causing the loss of the primary source of income of more than 12 million people; unemployment levels "surged" from 14.9 percent in 2011 to 57.7 percent at the end of 2014. As a result, 4 in 5 Syrians were by then living in poverty, with 30 percent of the population living in "abject poverty" and frequently unable to meet basic household food needs. An estimate from 2023 estimated the population below the poverty threshold in Syria to be 90%.

== See also ==
- List of companies of Syria
- Corruption in Syria
- Central Bank of Syria
- Banque de Syrie et du Liban
- Marota City
- Ministry of Economy and Industry (Syria)
- Ministry of Finance (Syria)
- Ministry of Energy (Syria)
- Hunger in Syria
- 2025 hunger crisis in Syria
- Economy of the Middle East

== Notes ==
=== Works cited ===
- Syria country study. Library of Congress Federal Research Division (April 2005).
