= Foz (disambiguation) =

Foz is a town in Galicia, Spain.

Foz may also refer to:

== People ==
- Peter Forrest, an Australian cricketer nicknamed Foz
- Samer Foz, a Syrian businessman
- Foz (given name)

== Places ==
- Foz do Iguaçu, also Foz, a city in Brazil
- La Foz, parish in Spain
- Foz-Calanda, also called Foz, a town in Aragón, Spain
- The Friends of Zion Museum, a museum in Jerusalem

== Other ==
- Foz, a character in the British television soap opera Hollyoaks
- Subaru Forester, nicknamed Foz
