= Four Seasons Hotels and Resorts =

Canadian headquartered international hotel chain

Four Seasons Hotels Limited
- Trade name: Four Seasons Hotels and Resorts
- Type: Private
- Industry: Hospitality
- Founded: 21 March 1961; 65 years ago
- Founder: Isadore Sharp
- Headquarters: Toronto, Ontario, Canada
- Number of locations: 133 hotels and resorts and 55 residential properties in 47 countries
- Key people: Isadore Sharp (Chairman); Alejandro Reynal (CEO)
- Revenue: ▲US$4.3 billion (2015)
- Owners: Cascade Investment (71.25%); Kingdom Holding Company (23.75%)
- Number of employees: 45,000 (2018)
- Website: fourseasons.com

Four Seasons Hotels Limited, trading as Four Seasons Hotels and Resorts, is a Canadian luxury hotel and resort company headquartered in Toronto, Ontario, Canada. As of 2026, Four Seasons operates more than 130 hotels and resorts worldwide. Since 2007, Bill Gates (through Cascade Investment) and Prince Al-Waleed bin Talal (through Kingdom Holding Company) have been majority owners of the company. As of January 2022, Gates-controlled Cascade Investment owns 71.25% and Alwaleed-controlled Kingdom Holding Company owns 23.75% of Four Seasons.

== History ==
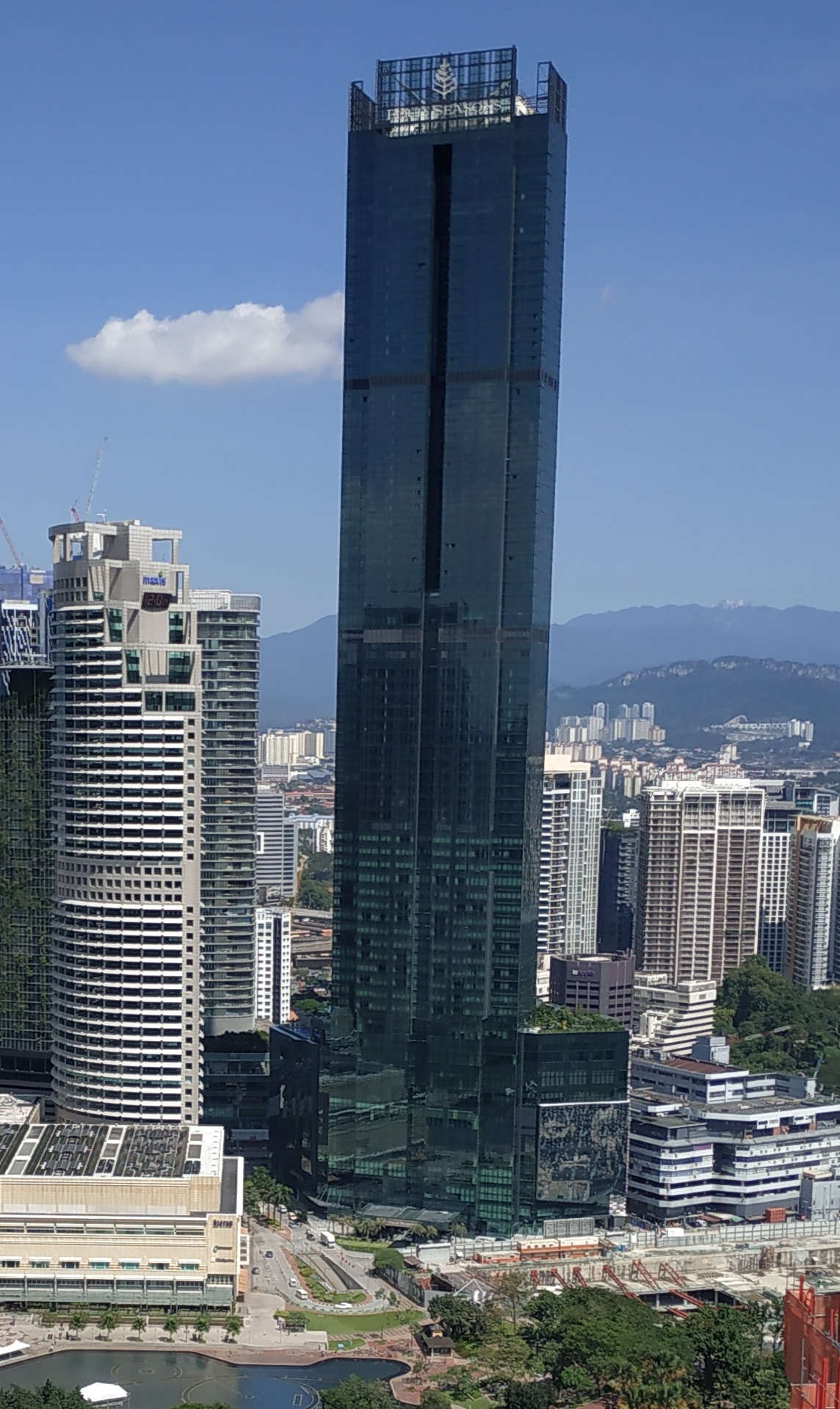
Four Seasons Place in Kuala Lumpur.

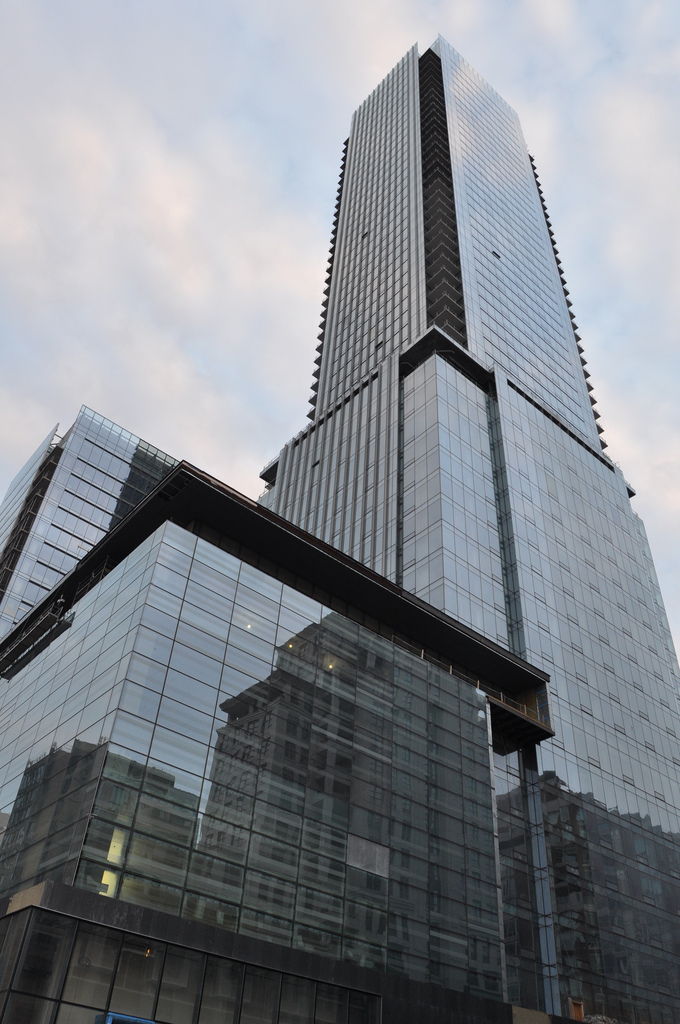
Four Seasons Hotel and Residences in Yorkville, Toronto

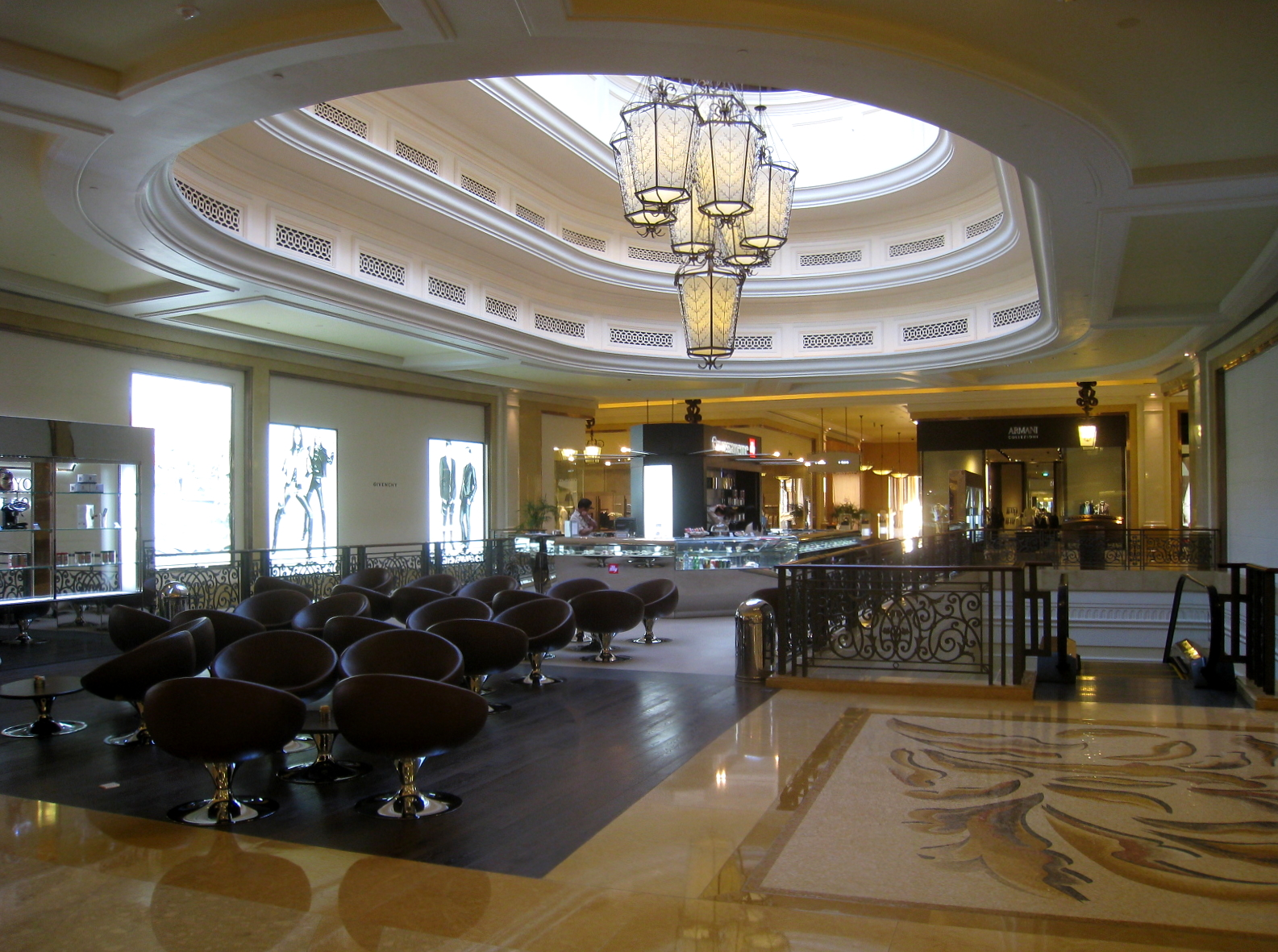
Interior of the Four Seasons Hotel and Resort in Macau

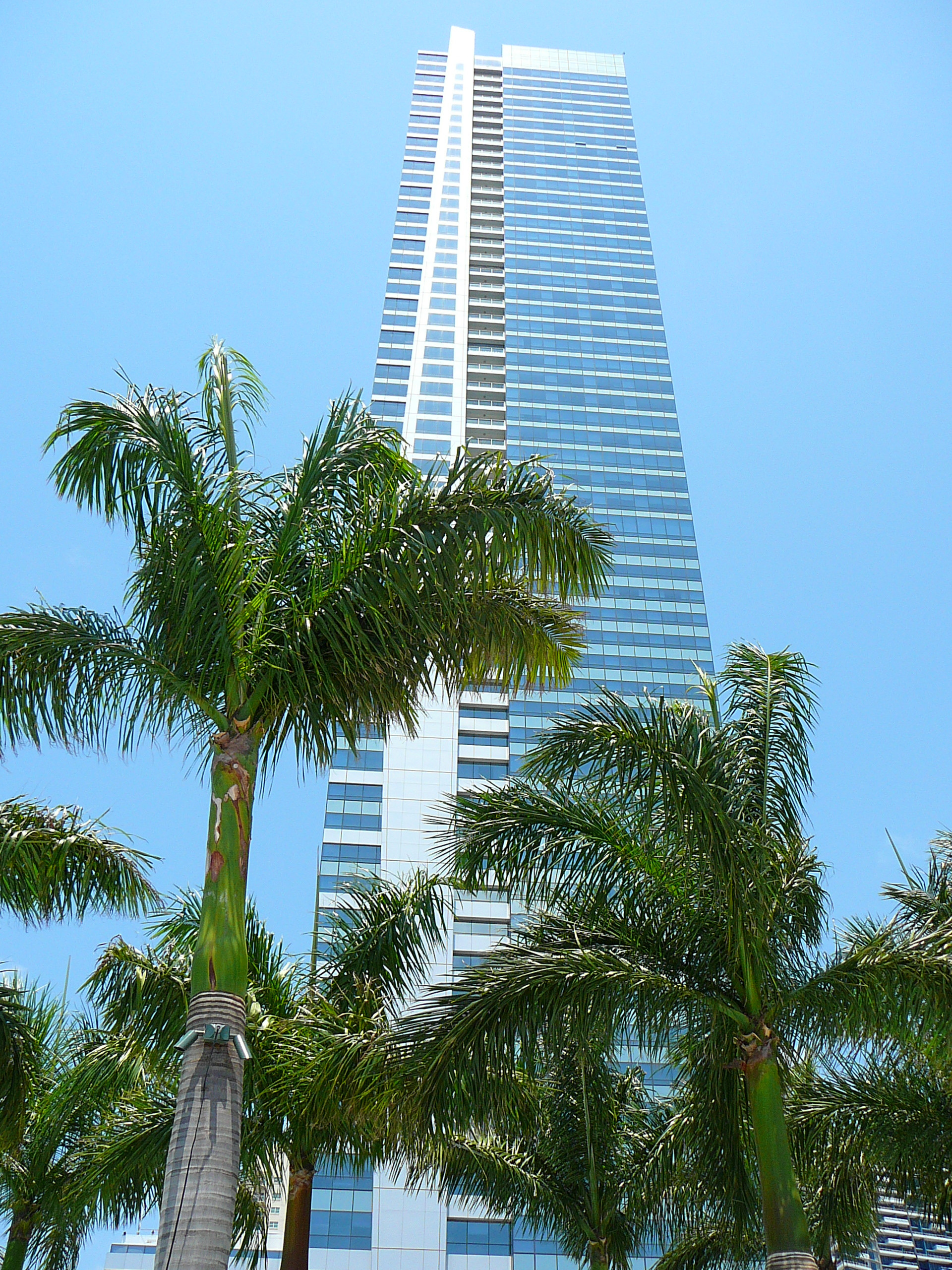
Four Seasons Hotel and Tower in Miami

Canadian businessman Isadore Sharp founded Four Seasons in 1960. While a young architect working for his father, Sharp designed a motel for a family friend; its success motivated him to try creating his own hotel. He bought a large parcel of land in a run-down area of Toronto and planned a stopover for business travelers; the Four Seasons Motor Hotel opened in 1961 with initial investors, Murray Koffler, Fred Eisen, and Eddie Creed.

Four Seasons built more hotels, including the 1963 Inn on the Park, a $4 million two-story resort hotel in suburban Toronto that housed Canada's first discothèque.

Upscale luxury became part of the brand when the company expanded to London, England. When a developer approached Four Seasons about building a hotel in London, Sharp planned it to compete with the city's old-world, elite hotels, such as Claridge's and The Connaught. The Inn on the Park hotel in London opened in 1970.

The lead consultant was the architecture firm Aedas.

In 1974, cost overruns at the Four Seasons Hotel Vancouver nearly led the company into bankruptcy. As a result, the company began shifting to its current, management-only business model, eliminating costs associated with buying land and buildings. The company went public in 1986. In the 1990s, Four Seasons and Ritz-Carlton began direct competition, with Ritz-Carlton emphasizing a uniform look while Four Seasons emphasized local architecture and styles with uniform service; in the end Four Seasons gained market share.

Built in 1986, Four Seasons Hotel Austin is a nine-story hotel on 2.3 acres (0.93 ha) of land on the Lady Bird Lake's north shore. In 1997, Four Seasons Hotel Austin became the first hotel to have "a high-speed wireless Internet network" after Wayport, Inc. set it up there for testing wireless Internet networks. The hotel hosted Queen Elizabeth II in 1991 when she visited Texas. It was acquired by Anbang Insurance Group from the Blackstone Group for $359.7 million in 2016.

In 1992, Four Seasons acquired Regent Hotels & Resorts. Most Regent hotels in the pipeline at the time, such as those in Bali and Istanbul, opened as Four Seasons, while the existing portfolio, such as the Beverly Wilshire, were allowed to temporarily retain the Regent brand until they met brand standards to become Four Seasons properties. Carlson acquired the rights to develop new hotels under the Regent brand in 1998, and by the mid-2000s, most of the older Regent properties had rebranded into Four Seasons, with the notable exception of Regent Singapore. In the wake of Regent's purchase by IHG Hotels & Resorts in 2018, Four Seasons announced that it would cease its management of Regent Singapore, therefore ending the company's 26-year-long association with the name.

Economic downturns in the early and mid-2000s affected the company. When the September 11 attacks caused the collapse of the travel industry, Four Seasons refused to cut room prices in order to preserve the perceived value of the brand, which caused tension with property owners who were losing money. The company recovered, and in 2007 it agreed to a buyout by Microsoft Chairman Bill Gates and Prince Al-Waleed bin Talal of Saudi Arabia for $3.8 billion. The pair own 95 percent of the company, and Sharp owns the remainder.

During the Great Recession, the company made the first corporate layoffs in its history, cutting 10% of its Toronto workforce. In April 2010, after a year-long dispute with Broadreach Capital Partners and Maritz, Wolff & Co., owners of the Aviara resort near San Diego, an arbitration panel ruled that, while both parties contributed to the demise of the business relationship, Four Seasons had not violated its management agreement. The arbitrators ordered Broadreach to pay Four Seasons to terminate the contract." The resort is no longer a Four Seasons.

Four Seasons has continued to add more hotels and resorts to its portfolio, notably in China. It opened a new hotel in Hangzhou in 2010 and Guangzhou, Beijing, and a second property in Shanghai in 2012. In India, it has two hotels—one in Mumbai and other one in Bangalore. In 2013, it opened its first hotel in Russia in the Lobanov-Rostovsky Palace in St. Petersburg, and later opened a second hotel in Moscow. In Indonesia, it has one hotel in Jakarta and another two in Bali. In October 2012, Four Seasons opened a new 259-room Toronto hotel in Yorkville, designed by internationally known design firm Yabu Pushelberg. The hotel includes an upscale restaurant led by celebrity chef Daniel Boulud. It was hailed by The Globe and Mail as "the renewal of an iconic Canadian brand in its hometown". The penthouse was bought by entrepreneur Robert Österlund (founder of Xacti, LLC and Inbox.com) for a Canadian record price of over $28 million.

In 2009, founder Sharp wrote a memoir titled Four Seasons: The Story of a Business Philosophy. It contained a historical chronicle of the hotels since its inception.

In 2020, COVID-19 lockdowns forced Four Seasons to temporarily close many of its hotels and resorts around the world. Through sheer serendipity, Four Seasons was the only hotel operator in the state of Hawaii willing to allow HBO to take over an entire resort—specifically, the Four Seasons Resort Maui—for 13 weeks to film a new television series with an unknown plot. The first season of The White Lotus was so well received that Four Seasons chose to partner again with HBO for the second and third seasons, which were filmed at its resorts in Taormina, Italy, and Ko Samui, Thailand.

In September 2021, Cascade announced it will increase its existing 47.5% stake to 71.25% by purchasing, for $2.21 billion in cash, half of the existing 47.5% stake owned by the Saudi Kingdom Holding Company (KHC).

In spring 2025, Four Seasons openly promoted its connection to The White Lotus for the first time during the show's third season. This culminated in the temporary transformation of the Four Seasons Westlake Village into a White Lotus resort and a screening of the season finale with many cast members present.

== Business model ==
Four Seasons does not own any of its properties; it operates them on behalf of real estate owners and developers. For example, its Las Vegas hotel is part of the Mandalay Bay complex (MGM Resorts). The contracts between Four Seasons and property owners typically permit the company to participate in the design of the property and run it with nearly total control over every aspect of the operation.

Four Seasons generally earns three percent of the gross income and about five percent of profits from the properties it operates. Property owners are required to additionally contribute money for marketing, chain-wide sales, reservations systems and renovations. Four Seasons hotels have larger staffs than competing chains, and the company maintains separate reserve accounts for each hotel to cover upkeep costs. Profit margins are relatively low, but the brand attracts developers through the hotels' reputation as solid assets for loan collateral or resale.

== Branded residences ==
Four Seasons also lends its name to branded residences, private homes sold to individual buyers. Its first residences were condominiums at the Four Seasons Hotel Boston, sold in 1985. Industry consultant Chris Graham credits them with launching the modern branded residence concept. As with its hotels, the company does not own these properties. Developers build and sell the homes, and Four Seasons manages the buildings itself rather than through a third-party operator. Properties under this model have included residences at its Toronto hotel in Yorkville, opened in 2012; in Mumbai, among India's first branded residences, in 2015; and its first standalone residences, with no hotel attached, at 20 Grosvenor Square in London, opened in 2019.

== Residential rentals ==
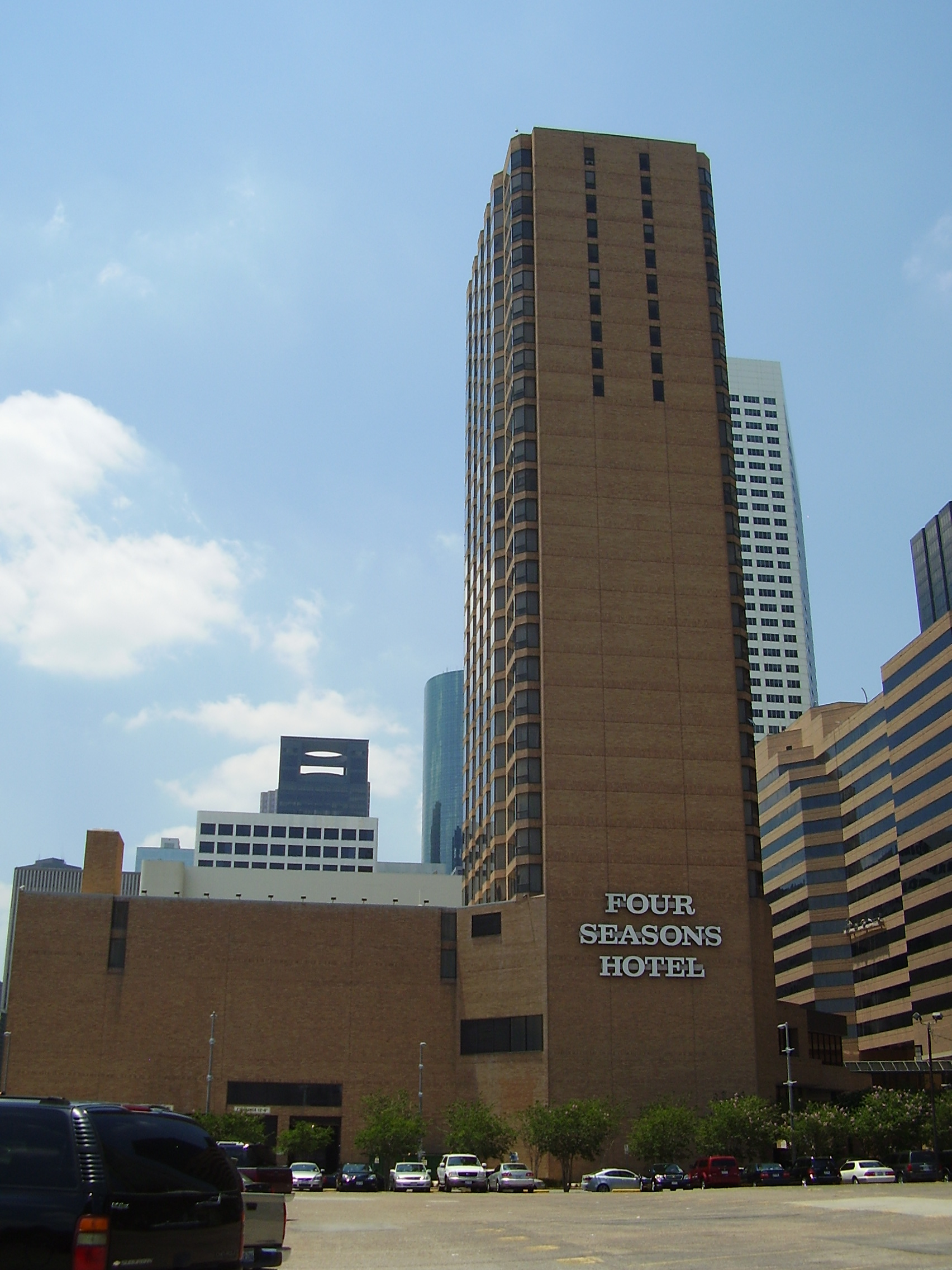
Four Seasons Hotel Houston which offers residential rentals

Four Seasons Hotels and Resorts began offering vacation rentals in June 2014. Titled Residential Rentals, the properties are available in: North America (Costa Rica, Houston, Jackson Hole, Nevis, Punta Mita, San Diego, Whistler, Vail). Africa (Marrakesh, Mauritius, Seychelles, Sharm El Sheikh), Europe (Cap-Ferrat) and Asia (Bali at Jimbaran Bay, Jakarta, Chiang Mai, Koh Samui, Bangkok).

Residential Rentals provide the same services as Four Seasons Hotels and Resorts in a residential setting. Customers are mainly multi-generational vacationers and small group travellers.

== Former properties ==
- Four Seasons Hotel Bangkok, Thailand: Opened in 1978 as The Peninsula Bangkok, it became Regent Bangkok in 1982, with Four Seasons retaining that name after it bought Regent from 1992 to 2003. Four Seasons ended its management contract in 2015, and the hotel was rebranded under owner Minor Hotels' Anantara brand.
- Four Seasons Hotel Berlin, Germany: Opened in 1996, management terminated in 2004. It was subsequently rebranded Regent Berlin.
- Four Seasons Hotel Damascus, Syria: Opened in 2005 and financed by Prince Al-Waleed bin Talal (who is a joint stakeholder at the company) and Syrian businessman Samer Foz. The hotel remained affiliated with the hotel chain years after the start of the Syrian Civil War, which saw Canada severing ties with Syria, until 2019, when the United States put sanctions on Foz for his ties with Bashar al-Assad. The hotel continues to call itself Four Seasons, despite no longer being associated with it.
- Four Seasons Hotel Dublin, Ireland: Opened in 2001, management terminated in 2014. It was rebranded as an InterContinental effective on 1 January 2015.
- Four Seasons Hotel Jakarta, Indonesia: Opened in 1995 as Regent Jakarta, a Four Seasons Hotel, the hotel was rebranded a proper Four Seasons in 2004. The hotel was closed in 2014, initially for renovations that were expected to be completed by 2018. However, it never reopened as a Four Seasons again. Management of the hotel was eventually assumed by Marriott International, which rebranded it as The St. Regis Jakarta in 2022. The name "Four Seasons Hotel Jakarta" now refers to another hotel that the chain opened in 2016.
- Four Seasons Hotel Lion Palace, Saint Petersburg, Russia. Opened in 2013 in a renovated palace that dates back to 1820. It left the chain in 2022, following the Russian invasion of Ukraine, though it continues to call itself Four Seasons.
- Four Seasons Hotel London at Canary Wharf, United Kingdom: Opened in 1999, left the chain in 2016. It is currently known as the Canary Riverside Plaza.
- Four Seasons Hotel Moscow, Russia: Opened in 2014 on top of a demolished hotel called Hotel Moskva, which operated from 1935 to 2004. Like its counterpart in Saint Petersburg, it left the chain following the Russian invasion of Ukraine, but continues to call itself Four Seasons.
- Four Seasons Hotel Philadelphia, United States: Opened in 1983, management terminated in 2015. Hilton Worldwide eventually took over the management; it is currently known as The Logan, a Curio Collection by Hilton. A new Four Seasons opened in the nearby Comcast Technology Center in 2019.
- Four Seasons Hotel São Paulo, Brazil: Opened in 2018, management terminated in 2020. Marriott International assumed partnership with the hotel in 2022 and rebranded it as JW Marriott São Paulo.
- Four Seasons Hotel Shanghai, China: Opened in 2002 as the first Four Seasons hotel in China. In 2020, the company announced that the hotel would be closed for renovations, which commenced in June 2022. The hotel was delisted from the Four Seasons website afterwards, and Hyatt announced that it will reopen the hotel as an Alila in 2024.
- Four Seasons Hotel Shanghai Pudong, China: Opened in 2012. Management was taken over by IHG Hotels & Resorts in 2020, which rebranded it Regent Shanghai Pudong.
- Four Seasons Hotel Tokyo at Chinzan-so, Japan: Opened in 1992. It was the first Four Seasons Hotel to open in Asia and Pacific region, but it left the chain in 2012. It is currently known as Hotel Chinzan-so Tokyo.
- Four Seasons Hotel Toronto, Canada: Opened in 1978 as a rebranding of the former Hyatt Regency Toronto, which had opened six years prior. The hotel closed in 2012, in conjunction with the opening of a new Four Seasons property in Toronto nearby, and was converted to a condominium.
- Four Seasons Hotel Vancouver, Canada: Opened in 1976, it was one of the few Four Seasons hotel directly owned by the chain, as opposed to being operated on behalf of a third-party. After 44 years in service, the hotel closed in 2020 following a legal dispute with its landowners.
- Four Seasons Resort Dallas at Las Colinas, United States: Opened in 1986 by the USAA, management was terminated in 2022. Marriott International subsequently assumed control, branding it as a Ritz-Carlton in 2024.
- Four Seasons Resort Great Exuma at Emerald Bay, Bahamas: Opened in 2003 as part of the Great Exuma's Emerald Bay resort development, management was terminated in 2009. Several months later, it reopened as Sandals Emerald Bay.
- Inn on the Park, Toronto, Canada: Opened in 1963 as the company's first luxury hotel, a prototype to the Four Seasons brand. It suffered a decline in the 1980s, ultimately leaving the chain in 1996 and being converted to a Holiday Inn. The hotel closed in 2005 and has since been demolished.
- Regent Singapore, a Four Seasons Hotel: Opened in 1988 as the Pavilion Inter-Continental Singapore, converted to Regent and taken over by Four Seasons from 1992 to 2018, making it the last Regent property under Four Seasons to retain its name. The hotel is currently managed by Hilton Worldwide as Conrad Singapore Orchard.
- The Ritz-Carlton Chicago, a Four Seasons Hotel, United States: Opened in 1975, the hotel joined the Four Seasons chain in 1977. Despite its name, it was not originally affiliated with The Ritz-Carlton Hotel Company (which did not exist at the time; the name "Ritz-Carlton" was carried under a license). It left the chain in 2013 before joining Marriott International in 2015, under which it began operating as a proper Ritz-Carlton.

== Ships ==
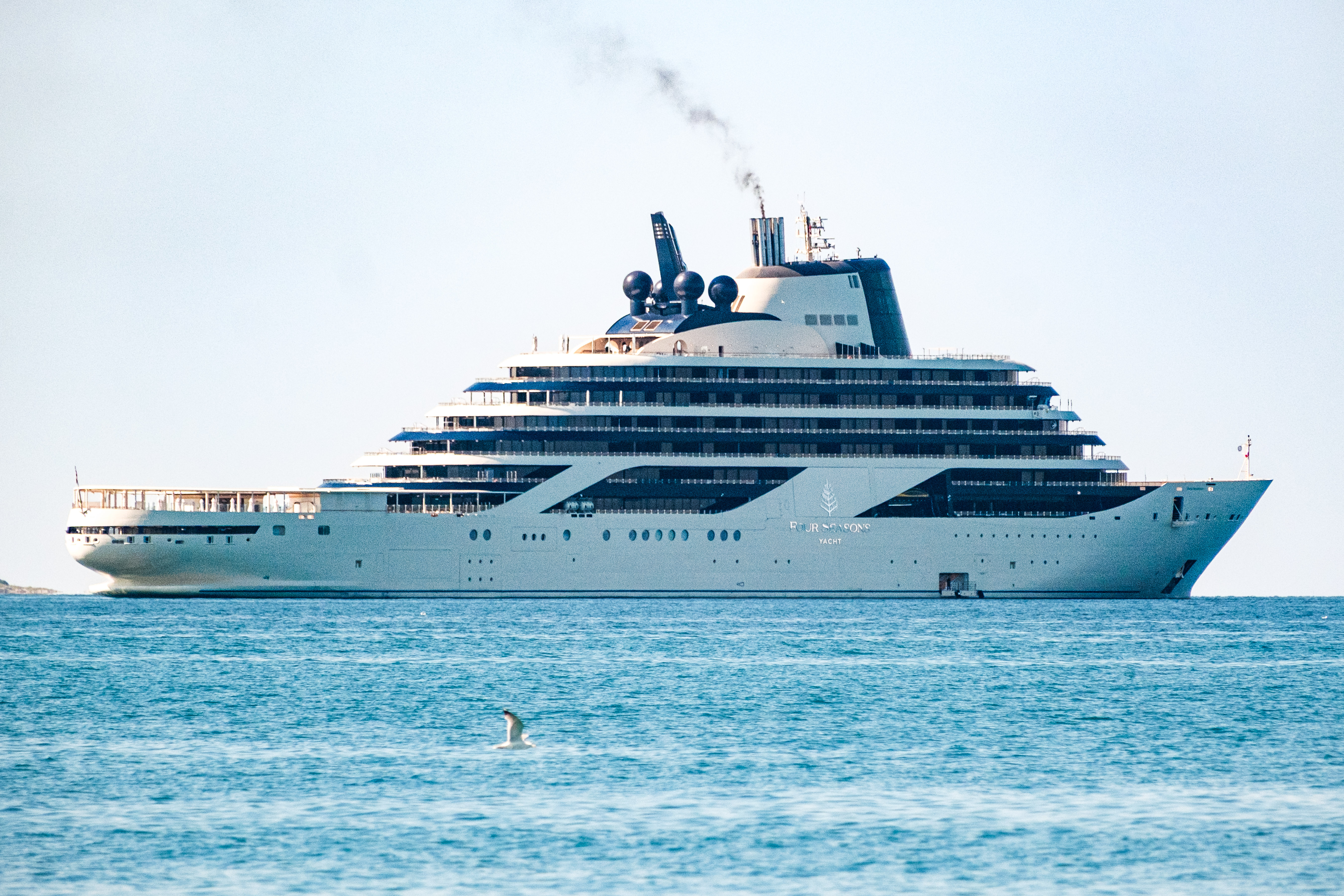
Four Seasons I near Poreč, Croatia in July 2026

In 2003, Four Seasons Explorer, a luxury three-deck catamaran with 11 rooms, began to sail in the Maldives. Visitors from the Maldives' two Four Seasons resorts, Kuda Huraa and Landaa Giraavaru, could either book rooms or charter the entire ship for trips that lasted from three to seven days. After two decades, the ship left the Maldives in 2023 for Palau, where Four Seasons began offering tours at the end of that year.

In September 2022, the Four Seasons announced it was launching Four Seasons Yachts. In June 2023, the company confirmed plans for a second ship due for delivery in 2026.

The first ultra luxury super yacht "Four Seasons I" was floated in Fincantieri Shipyard, Italy in January, 2025. The yacht has 95 ultra luxury suites with large balconies and floor-to-ceiling ocean views and is 679 feet long (207 meters). It was scheduled to enter service in January 2026 and will be captained by Captain Kate McCue. Its maiden voyage was on March 20, 2026 which coincided with the 65th anniversary of the Four Seasons first hotel opening. The maiden voyage went through the Mediterranean.

== Jet ==
The Four Seasons jet is an Airbus A321 neo-LR with 48 first-class seats designed for Wellness tourism. As of May 2026, the jet has the following amenities: 24/7 personal concierge, a dedicated travel planner, an onboard executive chef, a dedicated luggage concierge, a journey physician, and a Four Seasons trained service crew.

== Critical reception ==
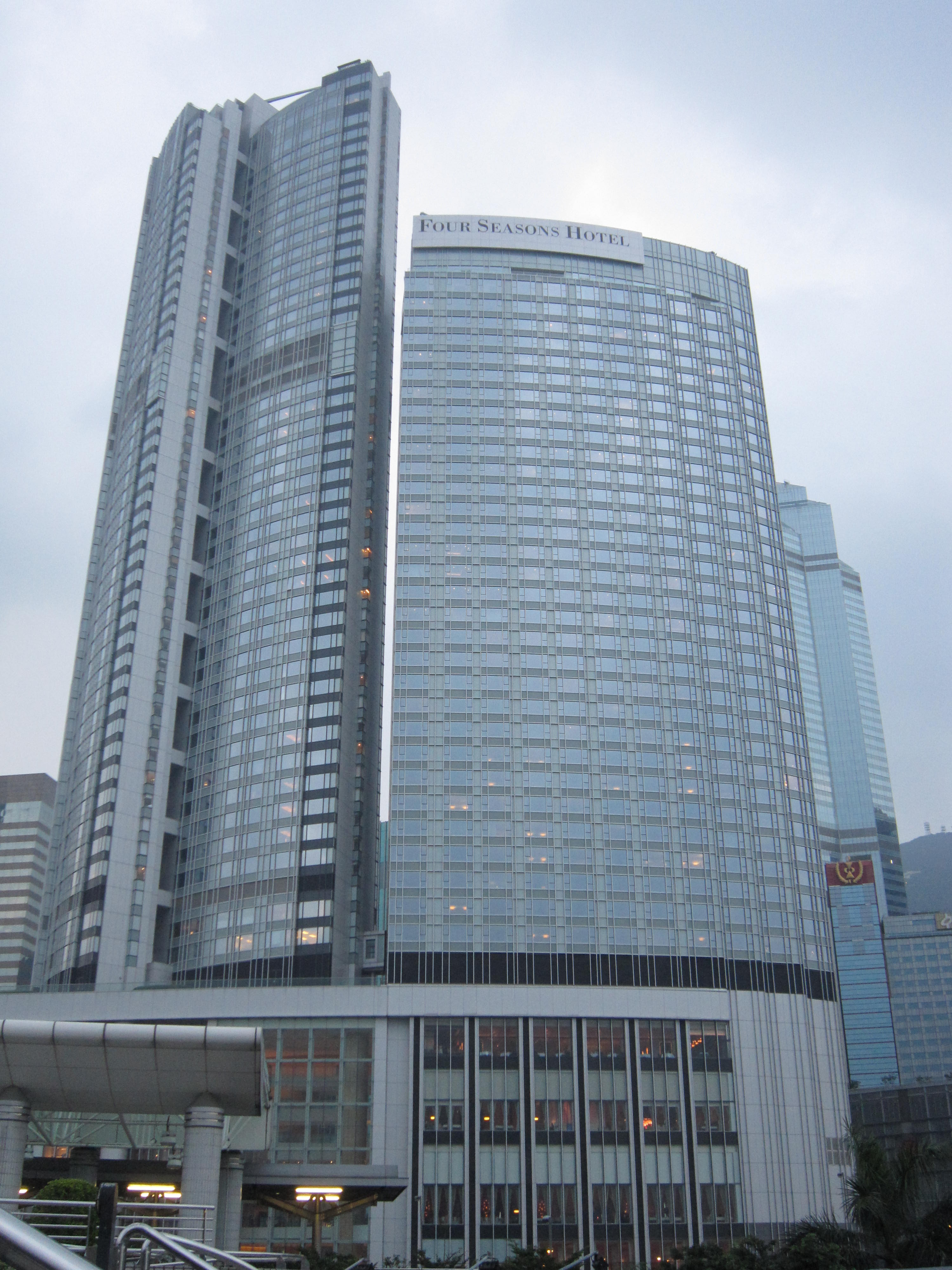
Four Seasons Hotel Hong Kong

Travel + Leisure magazine and Zagat Survey rank the hotel chain's properties among the top luxury hotels worldwide. Readers of Conde Nast Traveler magazine have voted Four Seasons Tented Camp Golden Triangle in Chiang Rai, Thailand as among the top ten hotels in the world for three consecutive years. The company has been named one of the "100 Best Companies to Work For" by Fortune every year since the survey's inception in 1998, ranking No. 47 in 2015, and is lauded for having one of the lowest employee turnover rates in the hospitality industry.

In recent years, restaurants at Four Seasons hotels and resorts have been recognized by Zagat and Michelin. The latter has awarded a total of 29 stars to 20 of the company's restaurants, including Four Seasons Hotel Hong Kong (three restaurants), Paris (three restaurants), Beijing (two restaurants) and Florence.

== Social responsibility ==
=== Sustainability ===
Four Seasons Hotels and Resorts frames its sustainability strategy under its corporate ESG program, "Four Seasons for Good". The company states that its goal is to preserve the natural environments where it operates while reducing the environmental impact of its hotels, resorts, and residences.
