= Four Seasons Hotel Vancouver =

Hotel in Vancouver, Canada

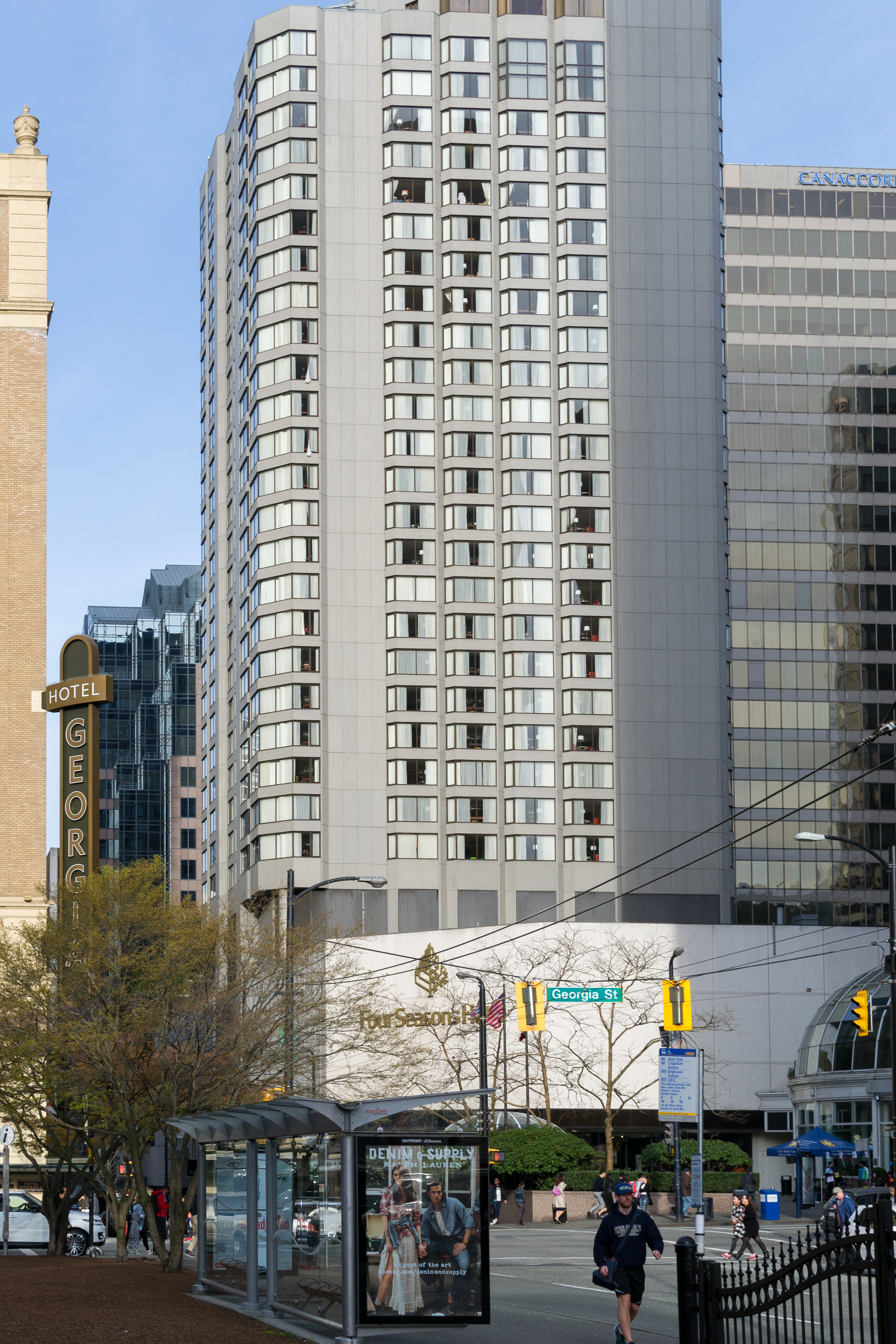
- Four Seasons Hotel Vancouver

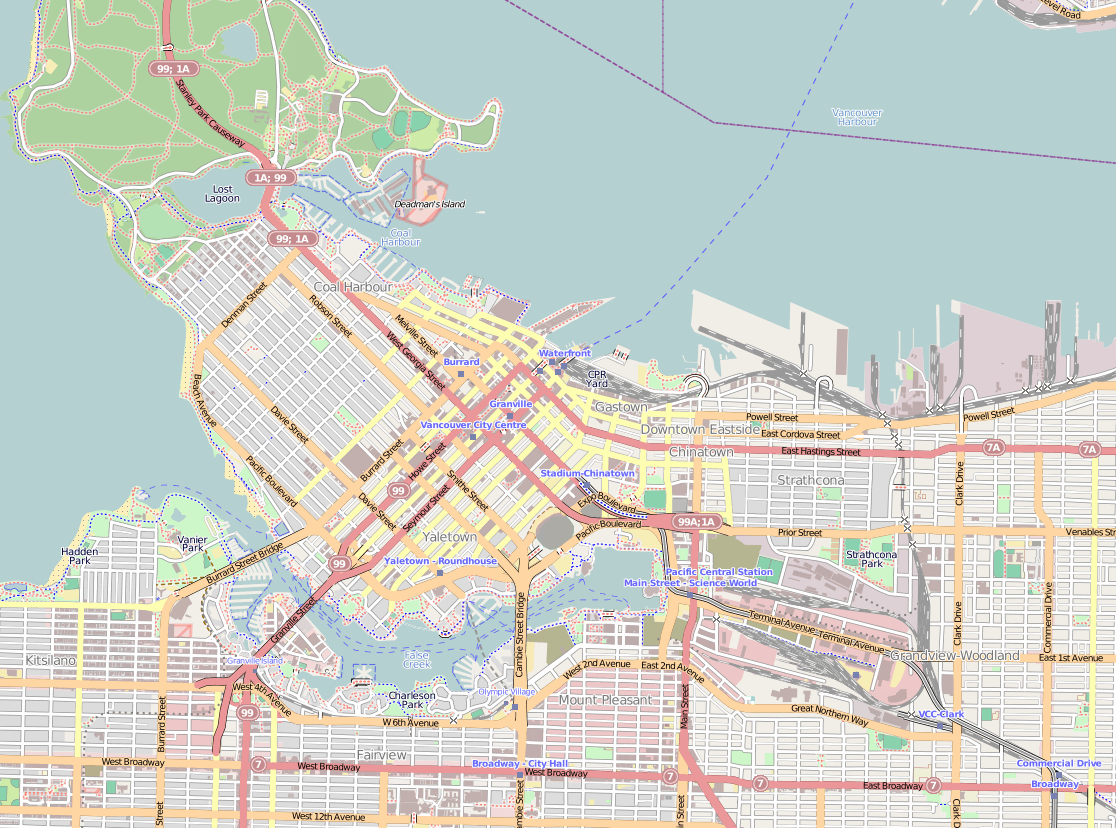
- Location within Downtown Vancouver
- Hotel chain: Four Seasons Hotels and Resorts

General information
- Status: closed
- Type: High-rise building
- Architectural style: Modernism
- Classification: Hotel; Commercial
- Location: 791 West Georgia Street; Vancouver, British Columbia; V6C 2T4
- Coordinates: 49°16′9.3″N 123°07′6.3″W
- Completed: 1976
- Renovated: 2010
- Closed: January 20, 2020
- Demolished: January 2025-present
- Owner: Four Seasons Hotels and Resorts
- Landlord: Cadillac Fairview

Height
- Architectural: 304.79 feet (92.90 m)

Technical details
- Floor count: 30 (27 above and 3 below)

Other information
- Number of rooms: 306
- Number of suites: 66
- Number of restaurants: 1
- Number of bars: 1
- Public transit: Canada Line

Website
- https://web.archive.org/web/20170603203150/http://www.fourseasons.com/vancouver/

The Four Seasons Hotel Vancouver was a large luxury hotel located in downtown Vancouver, British Columbia, Canada.

Opened in September 1976, the hotel featured 372 guest rooms, including 66 suites, and was connected to the Pacific Centre shopping mall, a major retail complex in the city. The hotel's amenities included the YEW Seafood + Bar restaurant, Stittgen jewelry store, Blo Blow Dry Bar hair salon, an indoor/outdoor pool, massage suite, fitness centre, 12 function rooms and the Park Ballroom.

The hotel received numerous accolades, including the Forbes Travel Guide Five-Star designation and the AAA's Five Diamond rating.

The hotel was notable for being the last Four Seasons property to be both owned and operated by the company. All other Four Seasons properties had transitioned to third-party ownership.

In May 2018, it was announced that the hotel would close, following the end of its lease agreement with Cadillac Fairview, the owner of the building. The hotel ceased operations on January 20, 2020. Cadillac Fairview indicated plans for a refurbishment and a new hotel brand to take over the space, but as of 2024, no new operator had been confirmed. In January 2025, the company confirmed that a development permit application to renovate the building had been withdrawn. An application for demolition was submitted to the city in December 2024 and is currently under review, with Cadillac Fairview indicating that they want to replace the building with a multi-purpose tower.
