= Ethnographic Museum of Dairy =

Museum in La Foz, Asturias, Spain

Coordinates: 43.25160°N 5.87235°W

The Ethnographic Museum of Dairy is a museum in the village of La Foz, Morcín, Asturias, Spain, 15 miles from Oviedo. Opened in 1993, the museum collects, studies and publicizes the various aspects of science and technology of milk and dairy derivatives, as well as traditional agricultural practices and customs.

== Exhibits ==
The committee of the Afuega'l pitu Cheese Contest founded the museum in 1990, with it being opened in 1993, when the Morcín City Council and La Probe Brotherhood created the Friends of Cheese Association to collect pieces for display in the museum. An annual exhibition is created at the museum to celebrate the contest, and another is created to celebrate the Asturian cheese fair. It is also located close to the former Montsacro pit, and draws on this heritage by using the mine's former hoppers to display exhibits.

The museum belongs to the network of ethnographic museums in Asturias.

Containing more than 500 display pieces, the museum is divided into four thematic sections: livestock, milk, butter, and cheese. Its facilities include an audiovisual room, a specialized library and a documentary archive. The museum also has a reproduction of a blue cheese maturation cave, and a collection of cheese making tools. The museum intends to teach people in depth about the agricultural customs and traditional processes involved in making a large variety of cheeses.

== See also ==
- List of food and beverage museums
