= Four Seasons Hotel Damascus =

Syrian luxury hotel

- فُنْدُق فَوْر سِيزُون دِمَشْق
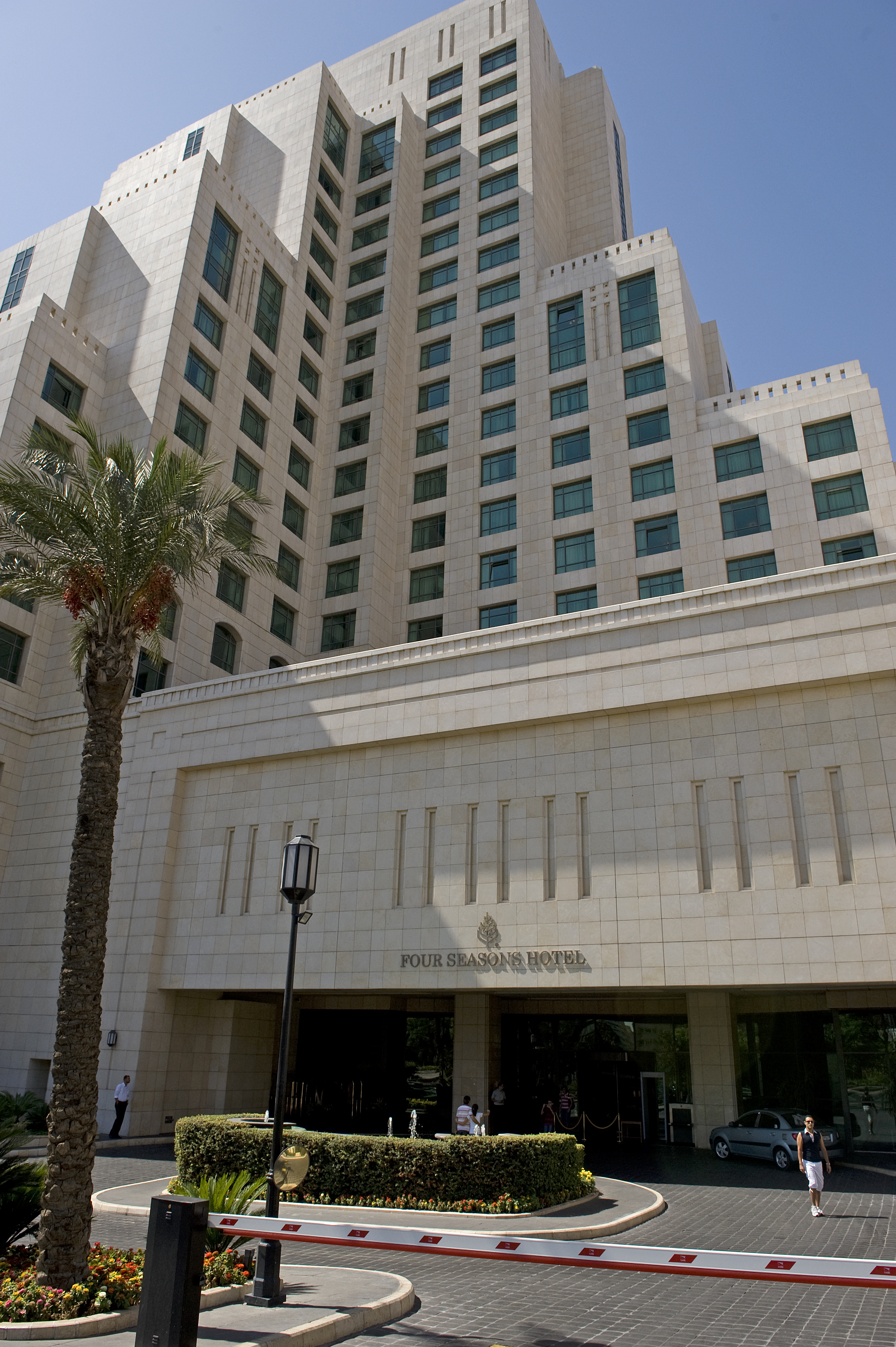
- Four Seasons Hotel Damascus, 2008

- Location within Damascus

General information
- Location: Damascus, Syria
- Coordinates: 33°30′50″N 36°17′28″E
- Groundbreaking: 2001
- Opening: 2005
- Owner: Samer Foz (until 2024); Syrian Ministry of Tourism (since 2025)

Height
- Height: 82.54 meters

Technical details
- Floor count: 23

Design and construction
- Architects: Dar Al-Handasah (Shair and Partners)
- Main contractor: Fouad Takla

Other information
- Number of rooms: 297
- Number of suites: 66

The Four Seasons Hotel Damascus (Arabic: فُنْدُق فَوْر سِيزُون دِمَشْق, romanized: Funduq Fawr Sīzūn Dimašq) is a 297-room five-star hotel and was part of the Toronto-based Four Seasons luxury hotels and resorts from 2005 to 2019. It is located in the central district neighborhood of Damascus, Syria, near the Barada River, on Shukri al-Quwatli Street.

== History ==
The hotel was financed by Saudi prince Al-Waleed bin Talal and was constructed by the local Fouad Takla Company. It opened on 1 December 2005. Al-Waleed later sold his stake in the hotel to Syrian businessman Samer Foz. The Syrian government is the second largest stakeholder in the hotel.

Four Seasons Hotels severed its management contract with the property effective 19 June 2019, due to US sanctions on Foz. The US government accused Foz of war-profiteering and doing business with the Syrian President, Bashar al-Assad.

The United Nations and several of its agencies used the hotel, which had the best security rating by UN's standards in Damascus, for their principal residences and offices during the civil war. In 2021, the United Nations spent $11.5 million at the hotel.

As of 2023, the hotel continues to operate using the Four Seasons name and logo, though it is no longer recognized as part of the chain.

=== Damascus bomb attack ===
On 7 July 2026, explosions occurred near the hotel during French President Emmanuel Macron's visit to Damascus, killing one and injuring 36 others. Macron was staying at the hotel, but was not there when the explosions occurred.

== Gallery ==
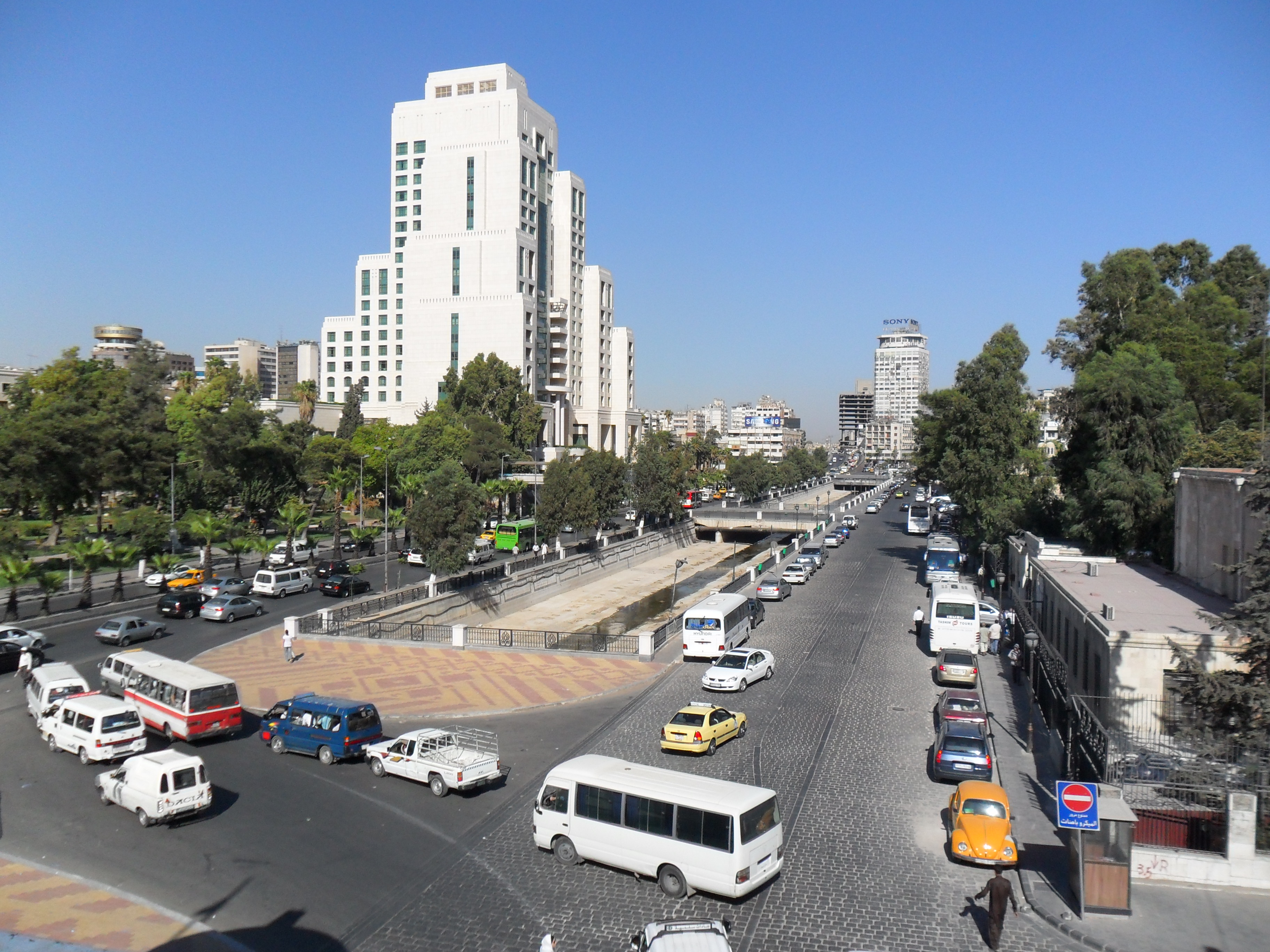
The hotel viewed from a distance

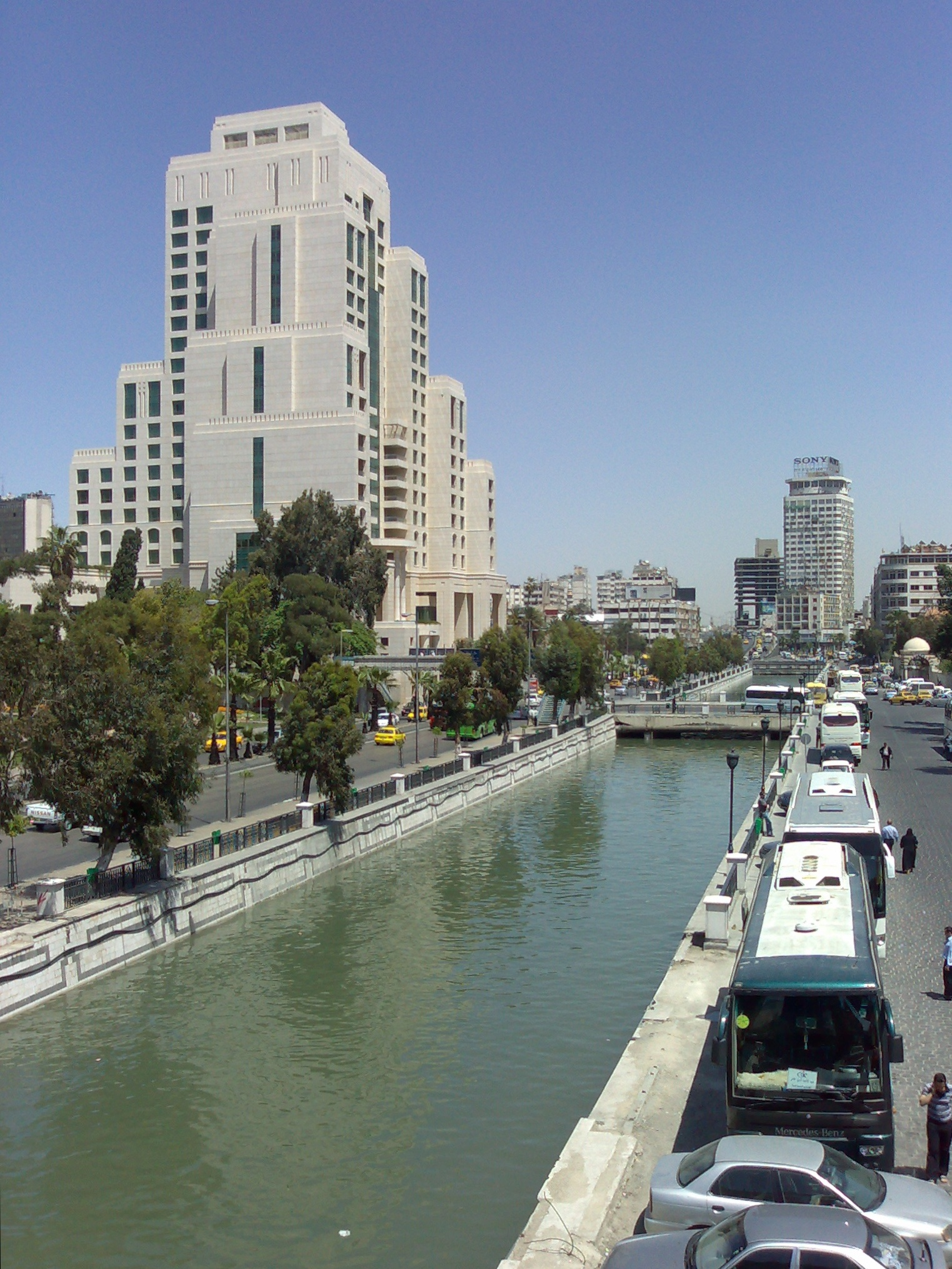
The Barada River near the hotel
