= Blue Tower Hotel =

Hotel in Damascus, Syria

Coordinates: 33°31′13″N 36°17′24″E

- فندق بلو تاور
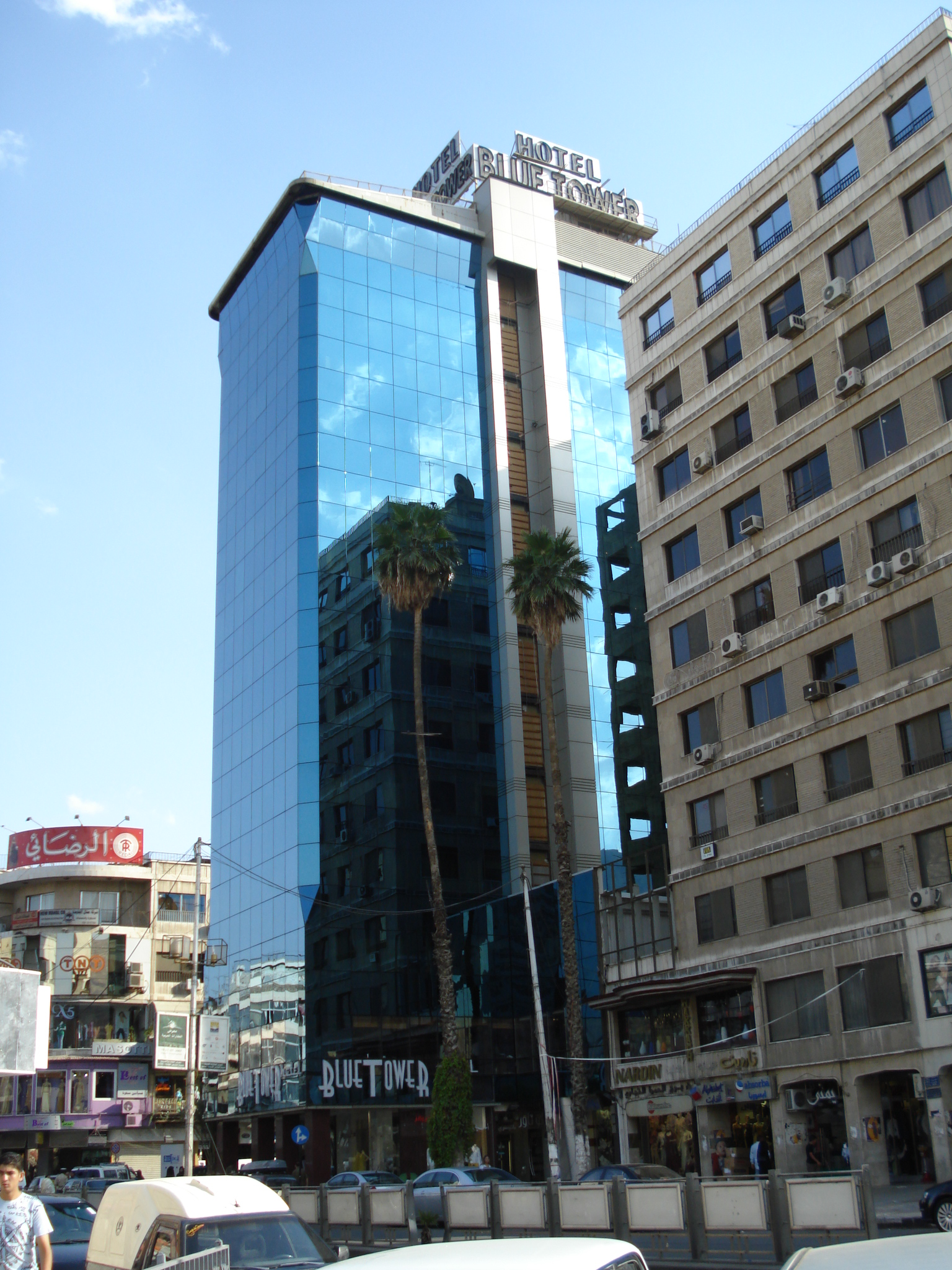
- Blue Tower Hotel

- Location within Damascus

General information
- Location: Damascus, Syria
- Opening: 2007

Other information
- Number of rooms: 59
- Number of restaurants: 1

Website
- Official website

Blue Tower Hotel (Arabic: فُنْدُق بِلُو تَاوْر, romanized: Funduq Bilū Tāwr) is a four-star hotel located on Hamra Street, Damascus, Syria. It has 59 rooms, one restaurant, one café and one bar. The hotel was opened in late 2007.

== Amenities ==
The hotel offers a Presidential suite, bathrooms with hot tubs, and rooms equipped with modern technology services. Communication facilities within each room include fax, telephone, Internet, and TV. The hotel also has a restaurant, bar, café and additional facilities include conference and meeting rooms, laundry services, and airport shuttle arrangements for guests.

For services in the common areas, the hotel offers guests access to a barber and hair stylist, a gift shop, and high-speed internet access.
