= Hunger in Syria =

Food insecurity and shortages in Syria

Hunger in Syria is a present-day crisis that has become prominent since the outbreak of the Syrian civil war and exacerbated by the country's efforts to control the spread of the COVID-19 coronavirus. The United Nations reported in 2020 that Syria faced "an unprecedented hunger crisis" as food prices had risen by 200 percent within a year with "tens of thousands" at risk of famine in the north-west region of the country, described as "the worst humanitarian crisis since violence broke out in Syria nine years ago". The World Food Programme was supporting 4.8 million Syrians in need of food. The 2025 Global Hunger Index reported that Syria ranked 113rd out of 123 countries with calculated GHI Scores. 39% of Syria's people are undernourished. 12.2% of children under 5 are wasted (low weight for height, which represents acute malnutrition). 23.5% of children are stunted (low weight for age, representing chronic malnutrition). Finally, 2.1% of children die before their 5th birthday. The GHI has shown a worsening trend between the years 2000 (14.8) and 2025 (30.6).

In June 2020, the head of the United Nations World Food Programme, David Beasley, said that a million Syrians were in severe need of food, with a risk of mass starvation without aid money. The food shortages were exacerbated by the country's efforts to control the spread of the COVID-19 pandemic during 2020. In July 2020, an estimated 8-9 million Syrians, representing around half of the country, were classed as food insecure, which was an increase of 1.4 million people since the start of the year. By February 2021, this number was reported by the World Food Programme as being 9.3 million people, the highest amount ever recorded.

== Cause of the problems ==
Syria faces numerous problems to overcome its shortage of food. In particular, the conflict severely disrupted farming and agriculture, key to the country's economy prior to the conflict. Available food is often unaffordable, while coronavirus lockdown measures have restricted income. In extreme cases, people have resorted to boiling and consuming weeds in desperation.

== Historical famines ==
Through March to October 1915, swarms of locusts stripped large swathes of vegetation from Syria and the surrounding regions, worsening what was already a severe shortage of food and compromising depleted food supplies. As many as 100,000 - 200,000 people died from starvation in the year following the locust attack, which was the worst the country had seen for decades.
