= La Foz =

- Parish
- Location within Spain
- Coordinates: 43.15°N 5.266667°W
- Country: Spain
- Autonomous community: Asturias
- Province: Asturias
- Municipality: Morcín

Population
  - Total: 1,022

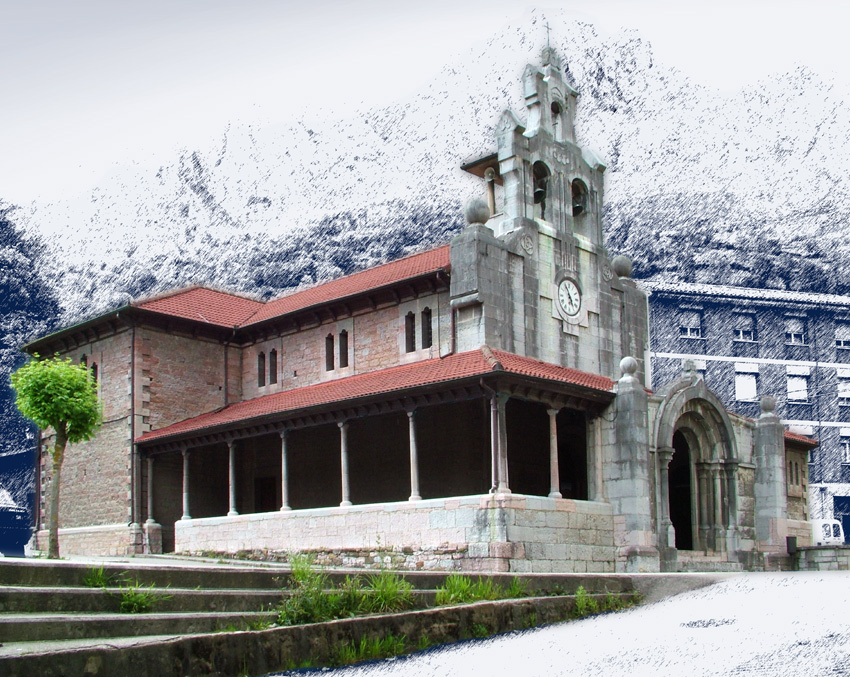
Church of San Antonio, La Foz.

La Foz is one of seven parishes (administrative divisions) in Morcín, a municipality within the province and autonomous community of Asturias, in northern Spain.

The Ethnographic Museum of Dairy is located in the parish.

== Demography ==
Source: Instituto Nacional de Estadística (Spain)

== Villages ==
- La Collada
- La Figar
- Lugar de Abajo
- Lugar de Arriba
- Los Llanos
- Las Mazas
- Otura
- Panizales
- Porriman
- El Pradiquín
- La Puente
- La Foz
