= Samer Foz =

Syrian businessman

- سامر فوز
- Born: May 20, 1973 (age 53); Latakia, Syria
- Other names: Samir Foz/Fawz; Samer Zuhair Foz; Samer Foz bin Zuhair
- Citizenship: Syria
- Known for: Aman Group

Samer Foz (Arabic: سامر فوز; born May 20, 1973), also known as Samer Zuhair Foz, is a Syrian businessman with close ties to the former Ba’athist Syrian government of Bashar al-Assad.

== Business activities ==
Foz was born in the city of Latakia to a Sunni family; his father worked as a pharmacist, and his uncle was a member of the Arab Socialist Ba'ath Party. In the early 1990s, Foz travelled to the American University of Paris to pursue his studies, after which he continued his education at the University of Massachusetts in Boston before later moving to San Diego, California, for additional academic training. After returning to Syria, he worked in the management of a cement-import company prior to the outbreak of the Syrian civil war.

He is the Chairman and General Manager of Aman Holding, which was formerly known as the Aman Group, which owns the Four Seasons Hotel Damascus. The company acquired the stake of Saudi Prince Alwaleed bin Talal in the hotel during his detention at the Ritz Carlton amid the Saudi purge. The Syrian government is the second largest stakeholder in the hotel. In August 2017, Aman Group announced a partnership with Damascus governorate, under its company Damascus Cham Holding, in building a luxury development called Marota City in the Basateen al-Razi area in the Mezzeh district of Damascus. In November 2017, Damascus Cham Holding granted Aman Group the right to develop real estate projects worth $312m as part of the project.

His business interests significantly expanded during the Syrian civil war into aviation, the cable industry, steel, sugar, car assembly and distribution, hotel management, real estate development, pharmaceuticals and banking.

Through his commercial network, Foz operated several companies in Turkey, including a mineral-water factory in Erzurum and warehouses and grain silos in İskenderun with a capacity of approximately 150,000 tons. His investments also extended to the mining sector, including a gold mine near the Turkish capital Ankara, in addition to real-estate and tourism projects in Istanbul and Bodrum, among them a five-star hotel.

Reports published in 2025 stated that Foz attempted to reach a settlement with the new government following the fall of the Assad regime but did not succeed, after which he settled in the United Arab Emirates.

== Controversies ==
=== Imprisonment in Turkey ===
He acquired Turkish citizenship and that of Saint Kitts and Nevis in the Caribbean through investment programs. In 2013, he was arrested in Turkey for involvement in the killing of the Ukrainian–Egyptian businessman Ramzy Mata following a dispute over a grain-import deal. He was sentenced to four years in prison but was released after only six months upon posting bail estimated at three million dollars.

=== Sanctions ===
He is sanctioned by the European Union and US Treasury for having "leveraged the atrocities of the Syrian conflict into a profit-generating enterprise [and being] directly supporting the murderous Assad regime and building luxury developments on land stolen from those fleeing his brutality."

=== Facilitation of trade with ISIS ===
Samer Foz reportedly transported grain from Syrian government-controlled areas to territory controlled by ISIS. According to other reports, he also moved wheat from ISIS-controlled areas through Turkey into Syrian regime-controlled territory.
