= Marota City =

General information
- Status: Under construction
- Type: Mix–use
- Location: Damascus, Syria

Height
- Architectural: Modern architecture

Technical details
- Floor area: 2,149,000 sqm

Website
- marotacity.sy

Marota City (Arabic: ماروتا سيتي) is an under-construction development project in Damascus, Syria. It is a mixed-use development project near Umayyad Square. The project is viewed as a post-war reconstruction efforts to progress Syria after the years-long civil war, which was started in 2011.

The project provides 110,000 job opportunities and 27,000 permanent job opportunities. The project site is located on the side of international road of Damascus, which connects to Lebanon and Jordan. The project symbolizes post-war reconstruction of Syria. However, it has been also met with criticism.

== Project ==
The project involves the reconstruction of mixed-used buildings, which provides 12,000 housing units for an estimated 60,000 residents. Marota City, the new district in Damascus, is supposed to host modern real estate developments within a space of 2,149,000 square meters. It includes gardens, water and sports spaces, administrative, and investment and commercial buildings, including two health centers, a fire station, 17 schools and kindergartens, five places of worship, and a floor car park.
