= Lebanese-Syrian pound =

Livre libano-syrienne (French)
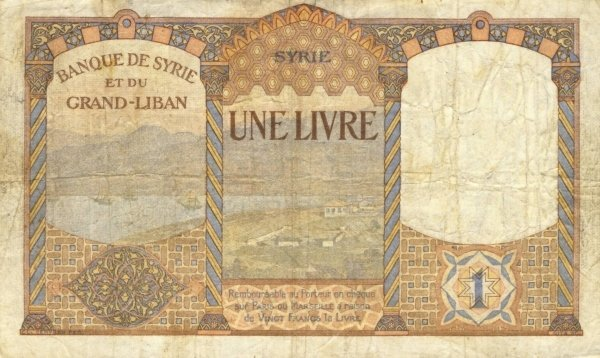

Denominations
- Subunit
- 1/100: piastre
- Banknotes: 1, 5, 10, 25, 50, 100, 500 livres

Demographics
- User(s): Lebanon and Syria

Valuation
- Pegged with: French franc
- This infobox shows the latest status before this currency was rendered obsolete.

The Lebanese-Syrian pound, officially called the Syrian pound until 1924, was a paper currency that was created on 31 March 1920 by Order No.129 of High Commissioner Gouraud to replace the Egyptian pound in the French Mandates in the Levant; the privilege of its issue was entrusted by this decree to the Banque de Syrie et du Liban (which was then called "Banque de Syrie"), and its value fixed at 20 francs payable by check in Paris.

It was issued in two series of banknotes of the same type from 1924 in the territories of the State of Greater Lebanon, the Druze State and the Syrian Federation, one of the two series bearing the name "Grand Lebanon", the other "Syria", as stipulated by an agreement concluded on January 23 of the same year between the representatives of these States and of this Federation and the representatives of the Bank of Syria. under the aegis of the High Commission of the French Republic and with the approval of the French Ministry of Finance, and which granted the exclusive privilege of issuing currency to the bank for fifteen years from the first of April. These two series were to circulate indifferently on the signatory territories without the amount of banknotes in circulation being able to exceed 25 million pounds.

== See also ==
- Lebanese pound
- Syrian pound
- Mandate for Syria and the Lebanon
