= Banque de Syrie et du Liban =

French, then Lebanese bank

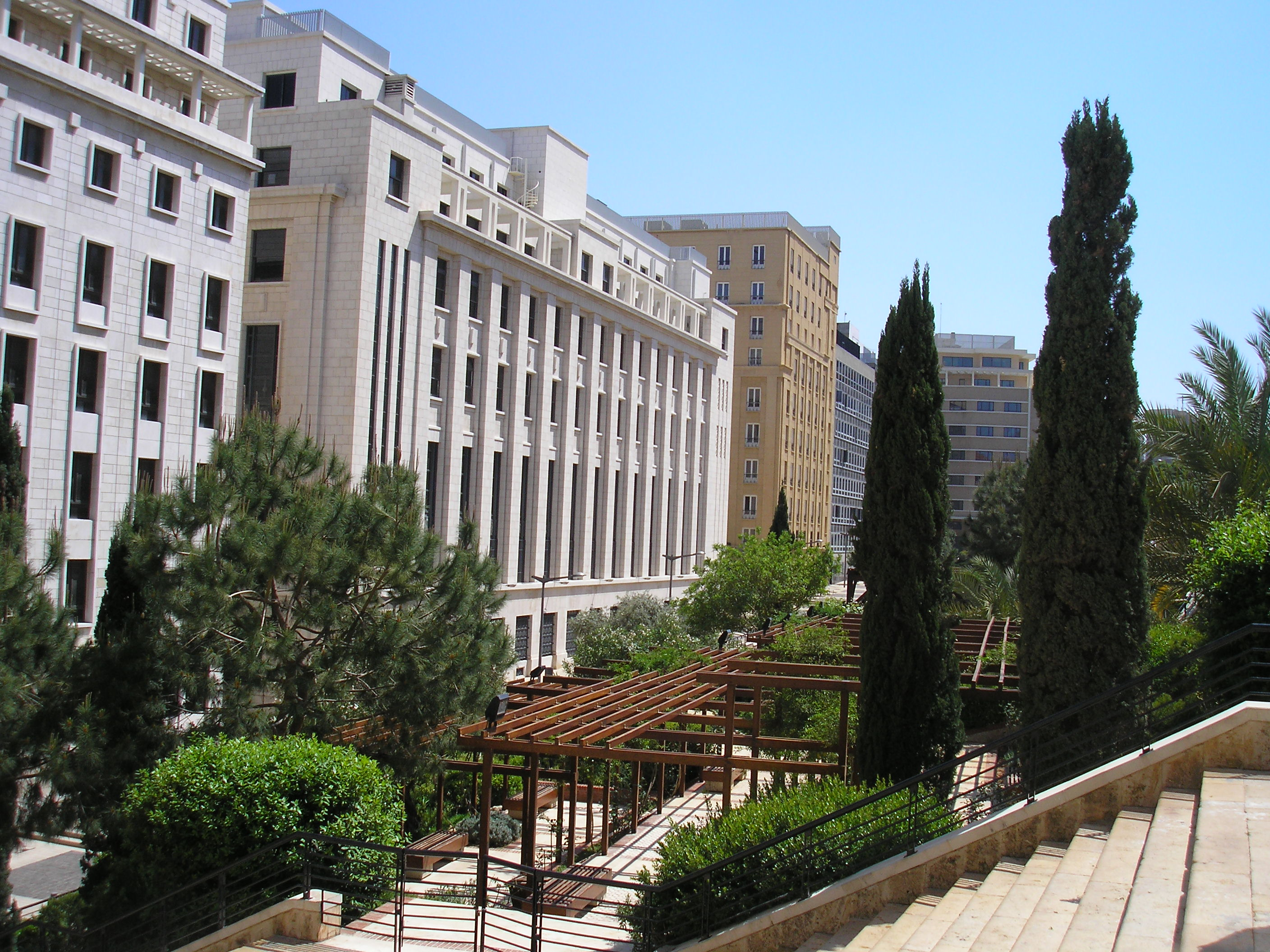
- Head office building on rue Riad El Solh, Beirut, completed in 1955 and restored after the Lebanese Civil War
- Industry: Banking
- Predecessor: Imperial Ottoman Bank
- Founded: 1919
- Headquarters: Paris until 1963, then Beirut, Lebanon
- Key people: Ramsay El-Khoury (Chairman)
- Owner: El-Khoury family
- Website: bslbank.com

The Bank of Syria and Lebanon, from 1919 to 1924 Banque de Syrie, from 1924 to 1939 Banque de Syrie et du Grand-Liban, then Banque de Syrie et du Liban (BSL) from 1939 to 1963, was a French bank that was carved out from the Imperial Ottoman Bank following World War I and granted a central banking role in what would become Syria and Lebanon under French mandate and in the early years of the two countries' independence.

The BSL's activities in Syria were nationalized in 1956 following the Suez Crisis. In Lebanon, it was reorganized in 1963 as its central banking functions became the country's central bank, the Banque du Liban, and its commercial activity was continued as the Beirut-incorporated Société Nouvelle de la Banque de Syrie et du Liban (SNBSL). That bank came under Lebanese ownership in 1987 and was rebranded BSL Bank in 2012.

== History ==
=== Background ===
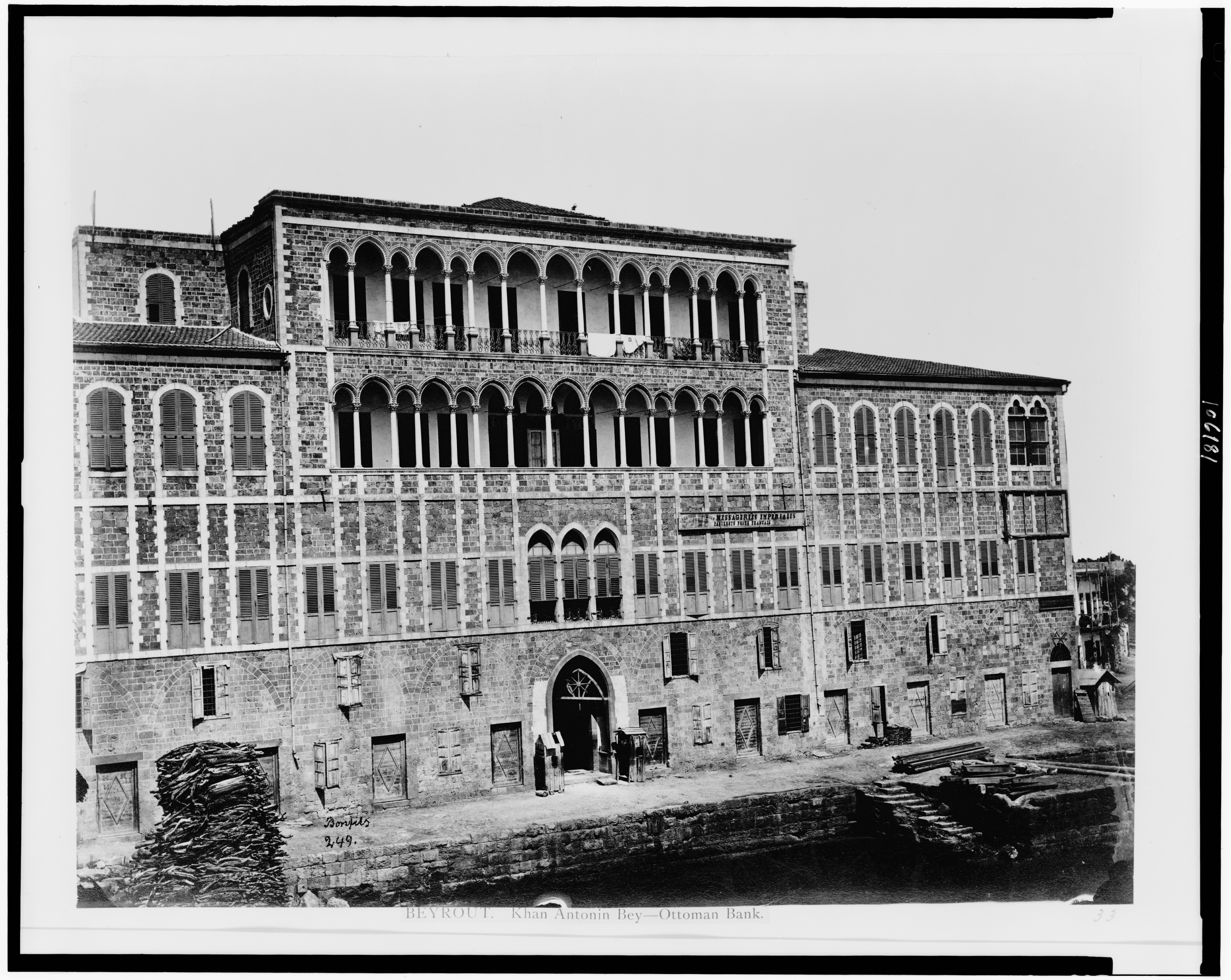
Khan Antoun Bey in the Beirut Souks, first location of the Ottoman Bank branch in Beirut

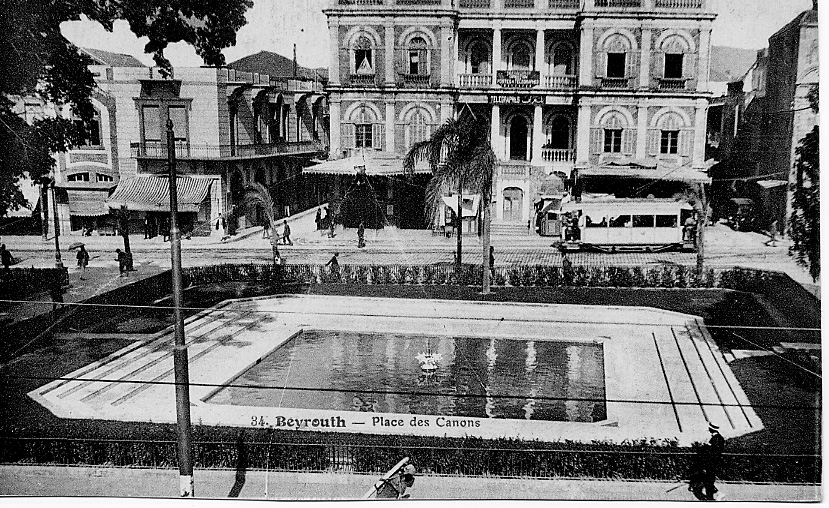
Second location of the Imperial Ottoman Bank's Beirut branch on Place des Canons, later Grand Hôtel Khédivial

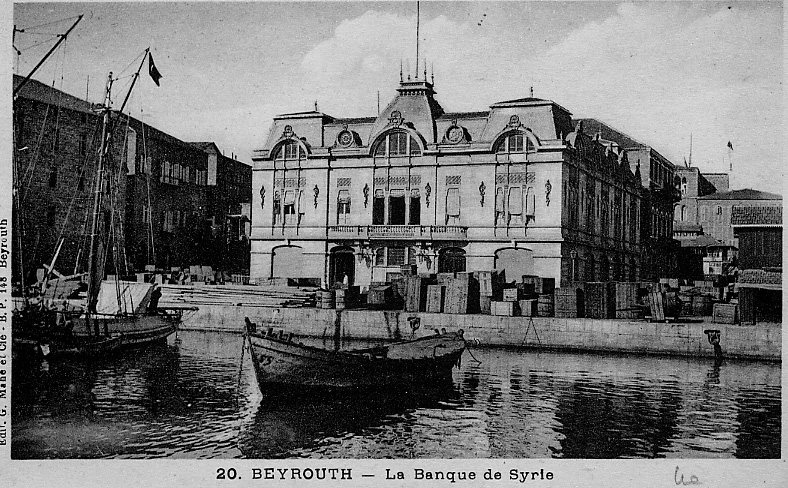
Third location of the Imperial Ottoman Bank's Beirut branch at the northern end of Allenby Street, which became the first local head office of the Banque de Syrie in late 1921

The Ottoman Bank opened a branch in Beirut immediately after its creation in 1856. It was reorganized in 1863 as the Imperial Ottoman Bank, known by its French acronym BIO for Banque Impériale Ottomane. In the 1890s, the BIO was instrumental in developing the Port of Beirut and the Beirut-Damascus railway and extensions in Syria. The branch was initially located inside Khan Antoun Bey in the Beirut Souks; in 1892 it moved to a new building on place des canons, now Martyrs' Square; and in 1906 to another new building in Western architectural style on the waterfront at the northern end of the street later named Allenby Street, while the previous location was repurposed as the Khedivial Hotel. The former two venues were destroyed during the Lebanese Civil War and not rebuilt during postwar reconstruction, while the latter was replaced before the war by the high-rise office building known as One Allenby Street.

Following Ottoman defeat during World War I, the territories of what later became Syria and Lebanon were ruled by the Occupied Enemy Territory Administration that brought together France, the UK and the Hashemites.

=== French mandate ===
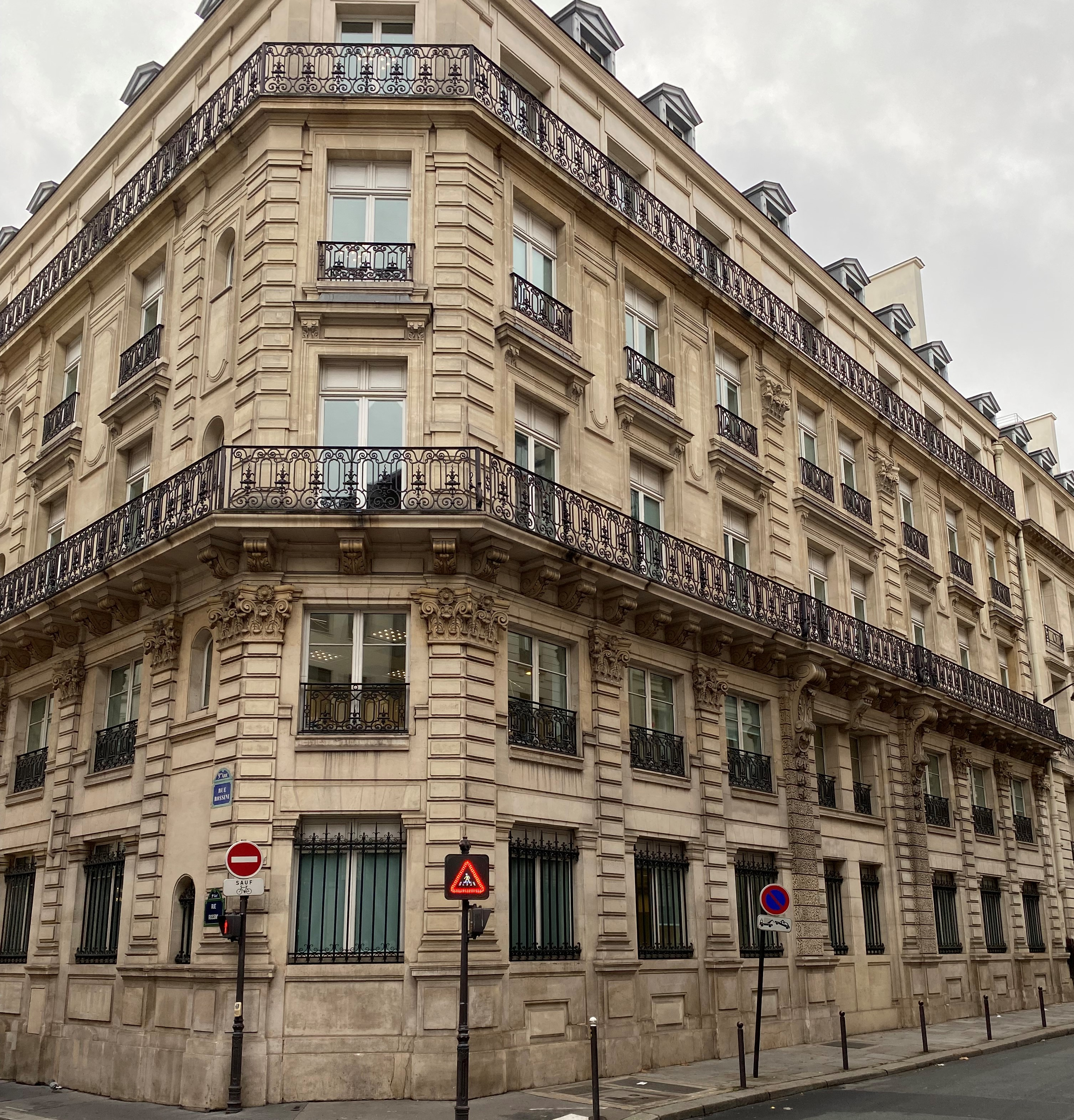
Building at 16, rue Le Peletier in Paris, the bank's head office from 1919 to 1927

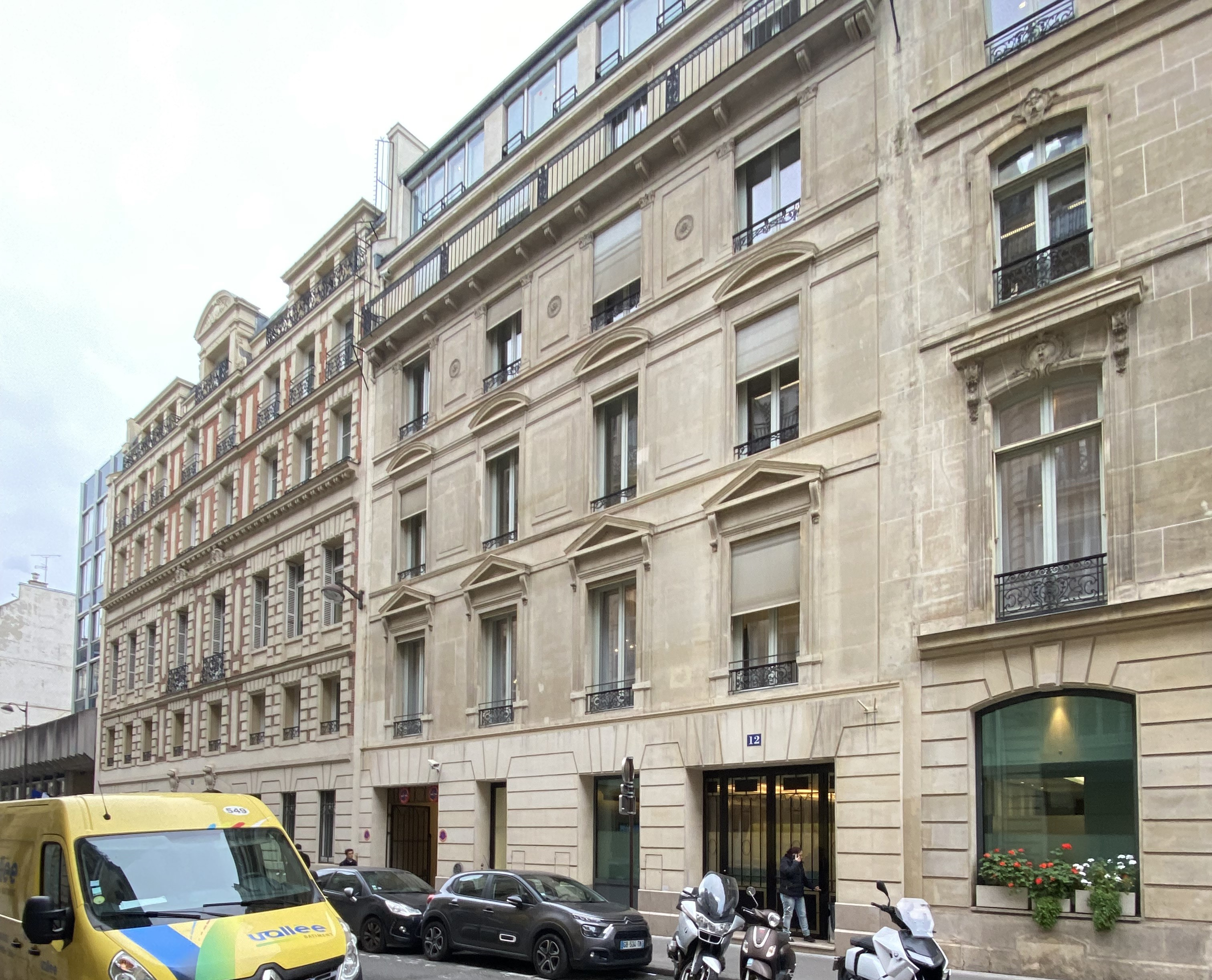
Building at 12, rue Roquépine in Paris, head office from 1927

In response to this new environment, the BIO decided in late 1918 to form a French bank, initially named Banque de Syrie and headquartered in Paris, in which the BIO initially retained 94.45 percent ownership. The new bank held its constituent general meeting in Paris on 2 January 1919. In March 1920, the French authorities granted the new bank the privilege to issue currency notes. The BIO, by then controlled by the Banque de Paris et des Pays-Bas (BPPB), transferred to the new entity its existing branches in Aleppo, Alexandretta, Beirut, Damascus, Hama, Homs, Sidon, Tripoli and Zahlé, a transaction that was only completed in late 1921.

The formalization in 1923 of France's Mandate for Syria and Lebanon led to the bank's first name change to Banque de Syrie et du Grand-Liban, on 5 March 1924. It eventually adopted the name Banque de Syrie et du Liban on 23 May 1939. It kept operating during World War II despite the breakdown of communication between occupied France and its Levantine mandate territories following the Syria–Lebanon campaign of June–July 1941.

The bank opened new branches in Latakia in the early 1920s, Antioch in 1925, Deir ez-Zor in 1930, and by 1937 also had branches in Aley, Idlib, Qamishli, As-Suwayda, and Tartus. It also had a representation in Marseille at the Ottoman Bank's branch. Its Parisian head office was initially at 16, rue Le Peletier, in a building acquired by the Banque de l'Union Parisienne in 1913, and next door to the BIO's older affiliate the Banque Franco-Serbe (est. 1910). It moved on 16 May 1927 to 12, rue Roquépine. In 1939, Türkiye annexed the Hatay State, including Alexandretta (now İskenderun) and Antioch (now Antakya). Later on the BSL also opened branches in Daraa, Al-Hasakah, and Raqqa in Syria, as well as Baalbek and Tyre in Lebanon.

The Lebanese pound was introduced in 1939 as a separate currency from the Syrian pound, following on earlier introduction of Syrian pound notes that included a mention of Lebanon but were interchangeable with other Syrian pound notes. Even so, the two currencies, both issued by the BSL, remained pegged to a reference currency (the French franc until 1941, then the British pound) and thus to each other until in 1948, after the two countries' independence.

=== Arab Nationalist era ===
In 1953, the Second Syrian Republic authorities withdrew the BSL's issuance privilege of the BSL, which after a three-year transition was taken by the newly established Central Bank of Syria in 1956. Later in 1956, all BSL operations in Syria were nationalized in the aftermath of the Suez Crisis, and taken over by the state-owned Commercial Bank of Syria.

In Lebanon, the country's central bank, the Banque du Liban, was formed in 1963 from the issuance-linked operations of the BSL. The BSL's commercial operations were taken over by a new Lebanese entity controlled by the BPPB, the Société Nouvelle de la Banque de Syrie et du Liban (SNBSL), created on 2 April 1963, and kept operating under that brand for half a century. In the process of separation, the SNBSL secured ownership of the recently constructed BSL head office building on rue Riad El-Solh in downtown Beirut, with financing from the BPPB-controlled Ottoman Bank. The modern building, which had been built in the early 1950s and inaugurated in 1955, hosted both organizations until the inauguration of the Banque du Liban's own new head office in late March 1964.

=== Later developments ===
The SNBSL kept operating during the Lebanese Civil War. In 1987, the BPPB, by then known as Paribas, sold its majority stake to Lebanon's El-Khoury family group. Its head office building on rue Riad El-Solh was restored in the 1990s from wartime damage. On 4 July 2012, the SNBSL was rebranded as BSL Bank.

== Leadership ==
- Félix Vernes, Chairman 1919-1934
- Maurice Bérard, chief executive 1919–1945, chairman 1934-1945
- René Busson, chairman and CEO 1945-1951
- Émile Oudot, chairman and CEO 1951-1955
- Henry de Bletterie, chairman and CEO 1955-1963?
- Roland Pringuey, CEO 1964-1990
- Nadia Abdallah el-Khoury, chairwoman and CEO 1990-1998?
- Ramsay El-Khoury, chairman 1998?-present

== Banknotes ==
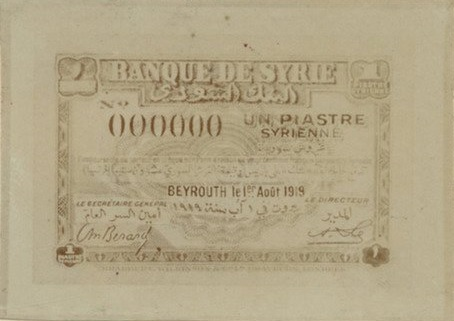
1 Syrian piastre, 1919

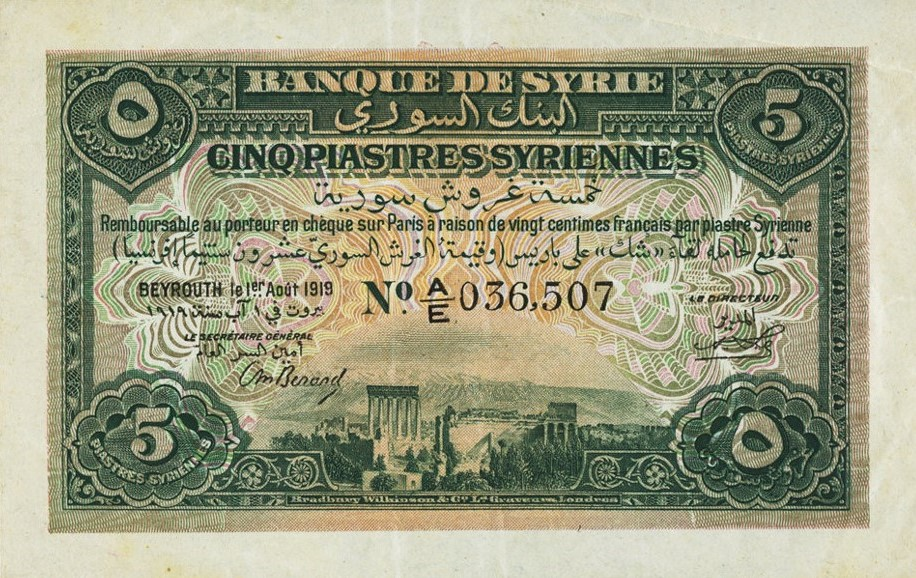
1 Syrian piastres, 1919

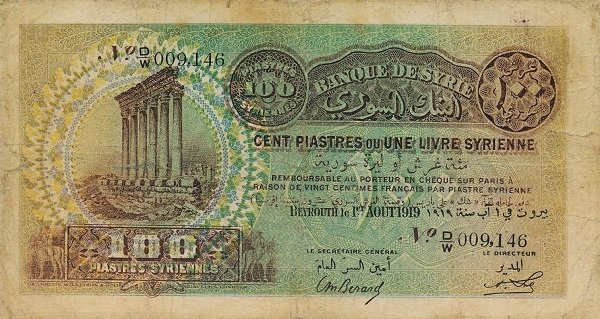
100 Syrian piastres (1 pound), 1919

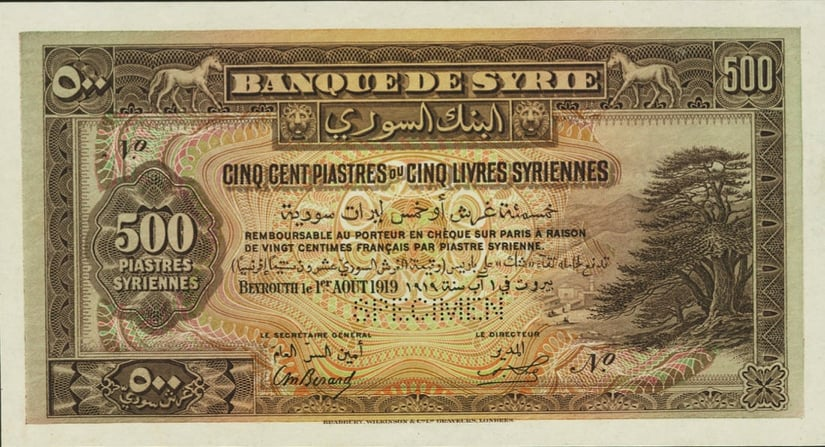
500 Syrian piastres (5 pounds), 1919

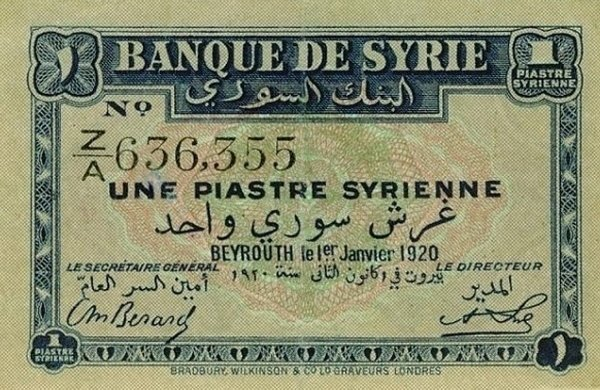
1 Syrian piastre, 1920

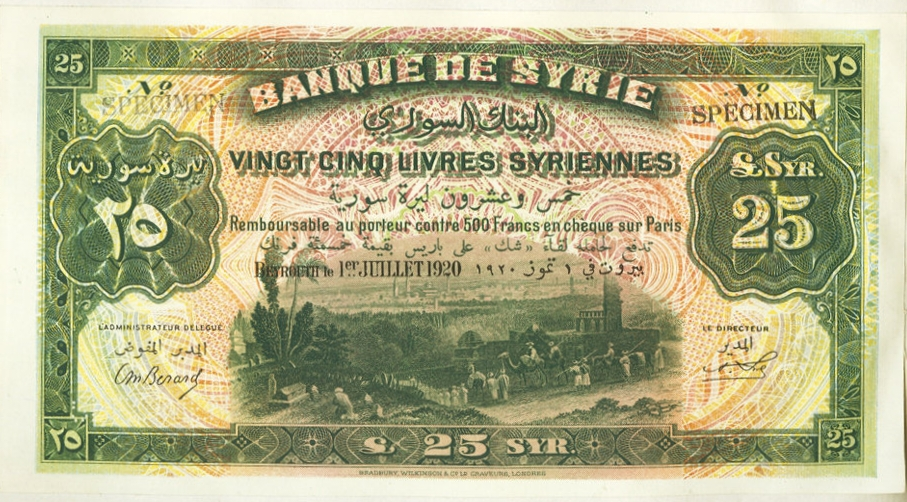
25 Syrian pounds, 1920

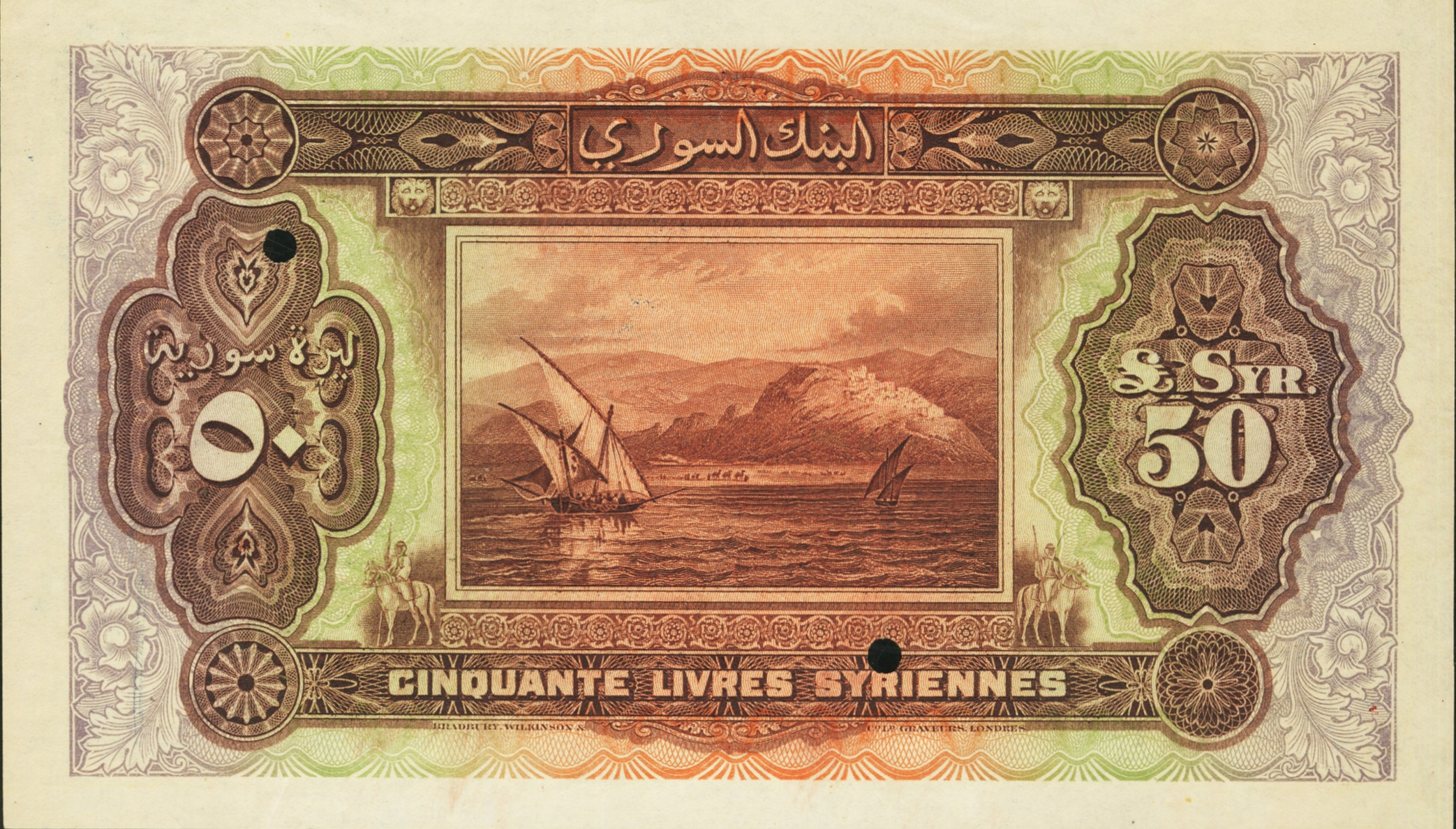
50 Syrian pounds, 1920

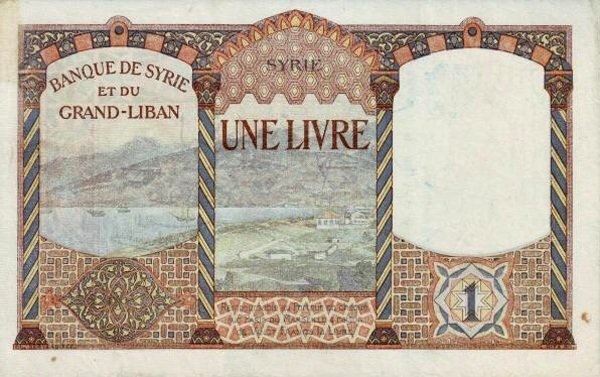
1 pound - Syria, 1925

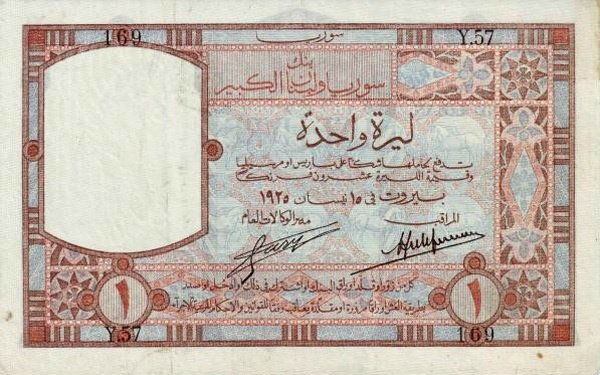
1 pound - Syria (back), 1925

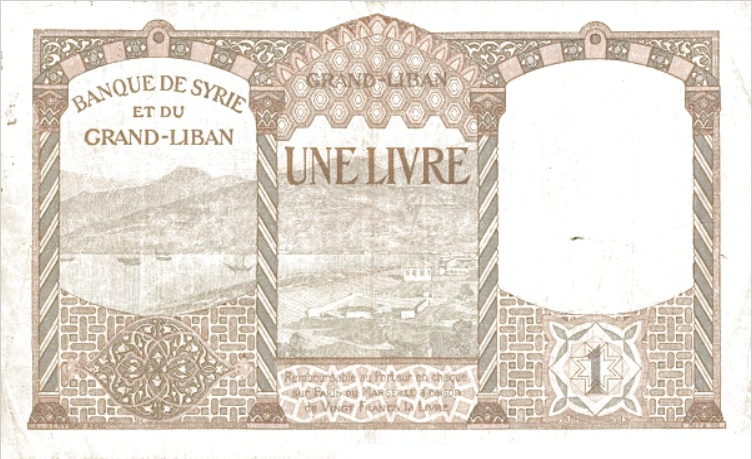
1 pound - Greater Lebanon, 1925

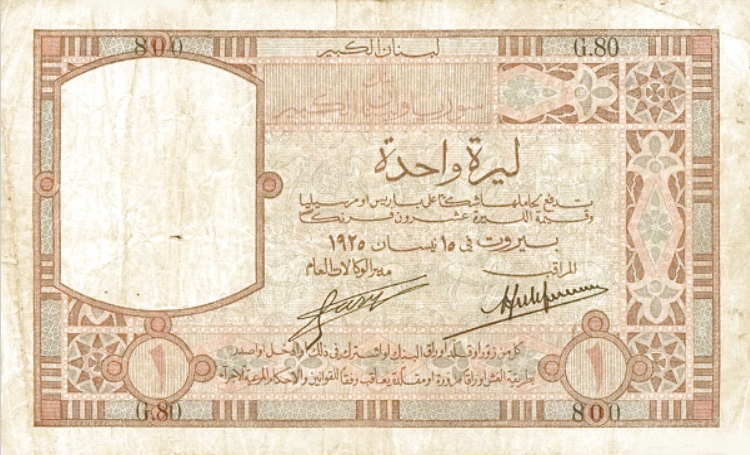
1 pound - Greater Lebanon (back), 1925

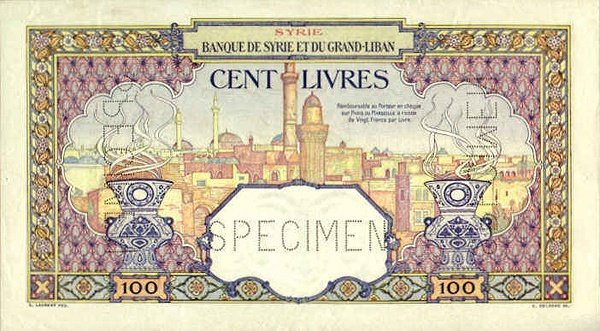
100 pounds - Syria, 1925

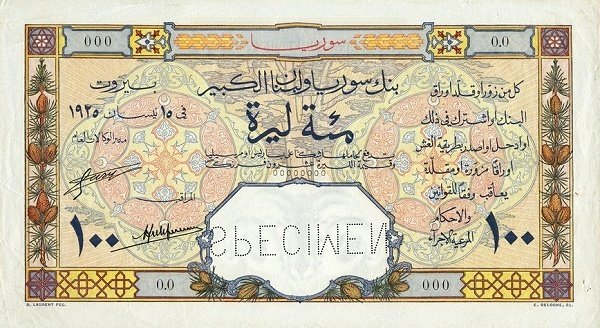
100 pounds - Syria (back), 1925

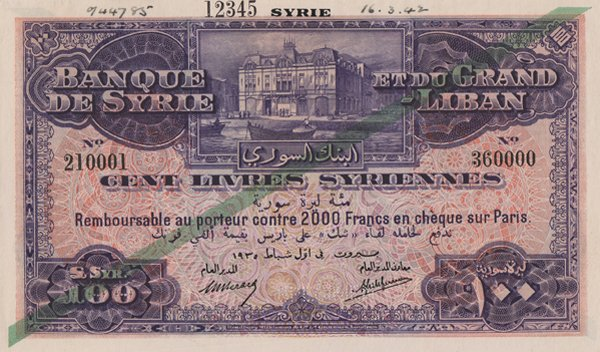
100 Syrian pounds - Syria, 1930; featuring the Beirut head office

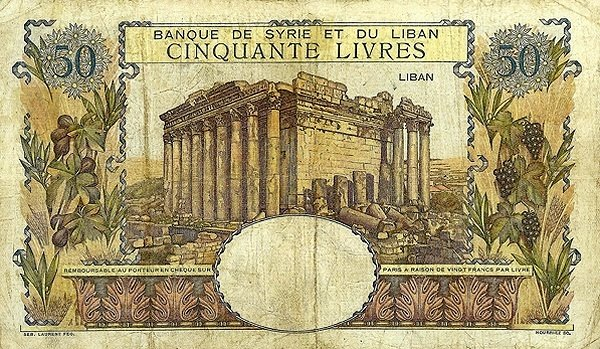
50 pounds - Lebanon, 1939

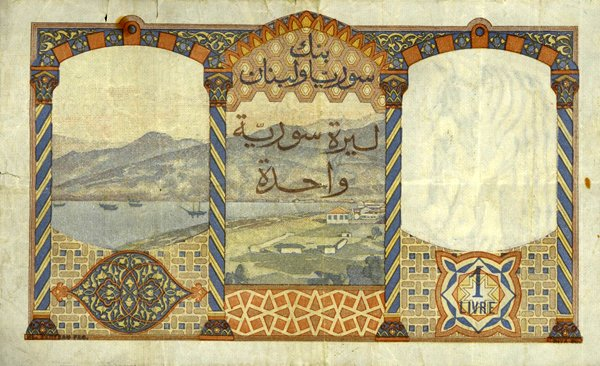
1 Syrian pound, 1947

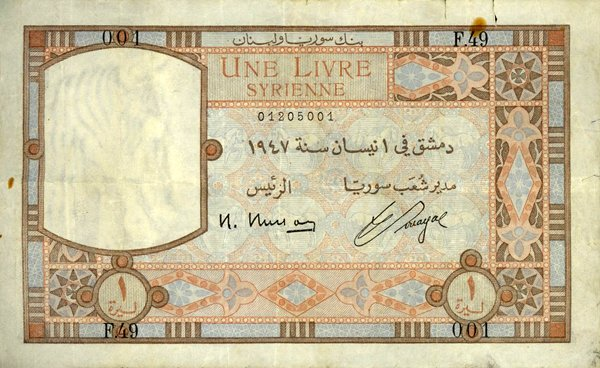
1 Syrian pound (back), 1947

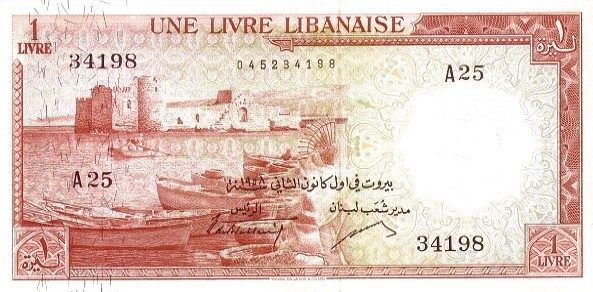
1 Lebanese pound, 1958

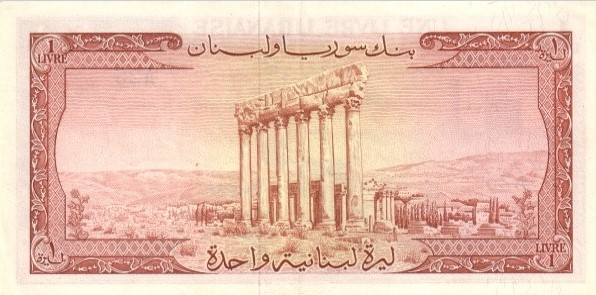
1 Lebanese pound (back), 1958

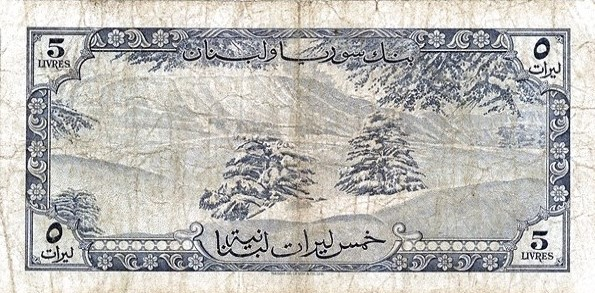
5 Lebanese pounds, 1964

== See also ==
- List of banks in Lebanon
- Syrian pound
- Lebanese pound
- Bank of Romania
- Banque Franco-Serbe
- List of banks in France
