= Lebanese pound =

Currency of Lebanon

ليرة لبنانية (Arabic); Livre libanaise (French)

ISO 4217
- Code: LBP (numeric: 422)
- Subunit: 0.01

Units of account
- Symbol: None official. The abbreviation LL or ل.ل. is used
- Subunit
- 1/100: piastre

Denominations
- Banknotes
- Freq. used: LL 5,000, LL 10,000, LL 20,000, LL 50,000, LL 100,000
- Rarely used: LL 1,000

Demographics
- User(s): Lebanon

Issuance
- Central bank: Banque du Liban
- Website: www.bdl.gov.lb

Valuation
- Inflation: 16.09% (Jan 2025)
- Source: blog.blominvestbank.com
- Pegged with: U.S. dollar = LL 89,500 ^{note}
- ^{note} Dual exchange rate system (Sayrafa)

Lebanese pound or Lebanese lira (Note: Arabic: ليرة لبنانية, romanized: līra Libnāniyya; French: livre libanaise; abbreviation: LL in Latin, ل.ل. in Arabic, historically also £L, ISO code: LBP) is the currency of Lebanon. It was formerly divided into 100 piastres (Arabic: قرش qirsh) but, because of high inflation during the Lebanese Civil War (1975–1990), subunits were discontinued.

The plural of lira is either lirat (ليرات līrāt) or invariant, whilst there are four forms for qirsh: the dual qirshān (قرشان) used with number 2, the plural qurush (قروش) used with numbers 3–10, the accusative singular qirshan (قرشًا) used with 11–99, and the genitive singular qirsh (قرش) used with multiples of 100. The number determines which plural form is used. All of Lebanon's coins and banknotes are bilingual in Arabic and French.

From December 1997 through January 2023, the exchange rate was fixed at LL 1,507.50 per US dollar. However, since the 2020 economic crisis in Lebanon, exchange at this rate was generally unavailable, and an informal currency market developed with much higher exchange rates. On 1 February 2023, the Central Bank reset the currency peg at LL 15,000 per US dollar. By mid-March 2023, the "parallel market" rate had fallen to LL 100,000 per dollar. On 19 December 2023, the Sayrafa rate (the rate the central bank redeems international credit and debit card payments) was established from LL 85,500 to LL 89,500 per US dollar. Most recently in 2025, the parallel market rate has stopped fluctuating to reach a rate of LL 89,500 per US dollar.

== History ==
Until World War I, the Turkish pound was the currency used in the area. In 1918, after the fall of the Ottoman Empire, the Egyptian pound was used. Upon gaining control of Syria and Lebanon, the French replaced the Egyptian pound with a new currency for Syria and Lebanon, the Lebanese-Syrian pound, which was linked to the franc at a value of LS 1 = 20 F. Lebanon issued its own coins from 1924 and banknotes from 1950. In 1939, the Lebanese currency was officially separated from that of Syria, though it was still linked to the French franc and remained interchangeable with Syrian money. In 1941, following France's defeat by Nazi Germany, the currency was linked instead to sterling at a rate of LL 8.83 = GBP1.00. A link to the French franc was restored after the war, but was abandoned in 1949.

Before the third phase of the Lebanese Civil War, USD1 was worth:

- LL 3.07 in 1965
- LL 3.26 in 1970
- LL 3 in 1971
- LL 2.70 in 1973
- LL 2.25 in 1975
- about LL 4 in 1981

In 1986, the pound began falling against the dollar. On 13 June, a dollar was worth LL 36.50. Two weeks later, it was worth LL 47.

- LL 500 in 1987
- LL 900 in December 1989

During the Civil War, the currency depreciated rapidly until 1992, when one US dollar was worth over LL 2,500. Subsequently, the government attempted to peg the currency: from December 1997 until February 2023, the official rate was fixed at LL 1,507.50 = USD1.00.

In August 2019, due to the increasing supply of Lebanese pounds in the economy, pressure on the fixed exchange rate with the US dollar started, creating a parallel market rate. In March 2021, the free market rate in Beirut was LL 10,000 = USD1.00. By July 2021, it was around LL 24,000 to the dollar. On 18 March 2023, the value of the Lebanese pound dropped in the free market to LL 111,000 against the US dollar, its lowest value ever.

On 10 May 2021, the Lebanese Central Bank (BDL) announced the launch of the "Sayrafa" platform, an electronic platform intended to record all Lebanese Pounds foreign exchange transactions and identify the exchange rates at any point in time. The platform was launched in June 2021 and became the official USD-to-lira exchange rate for all credit card transactions on 1 February 2022. In March 2023, the Sayrafa exchange rate became 43% less than the unofficial, free market rate. On 19 December 2023, the Sayrafa rate was established from LL 85,500 to LL 89,500 per US dollar.

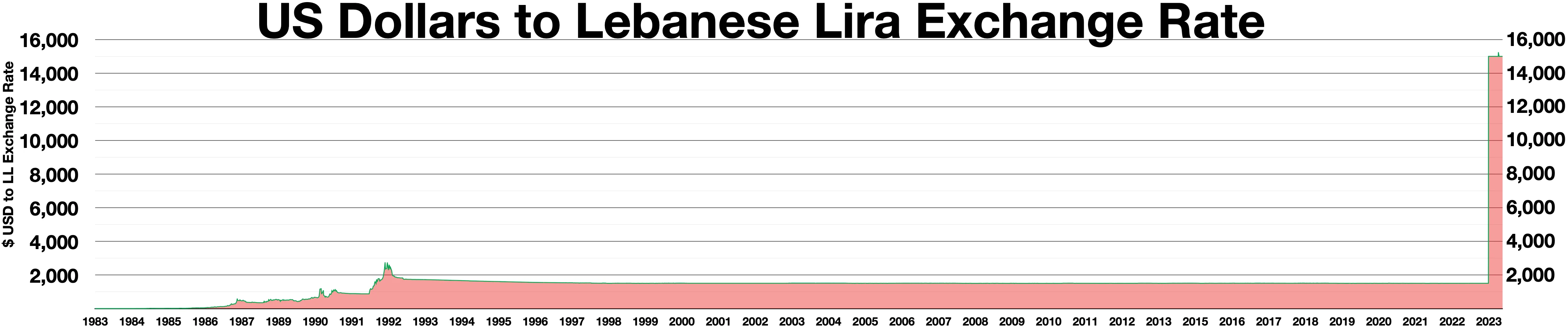
USD to Lebanese Lira exchange rate

== Coins ==
Lebanon's first coins were issued in 1924 in denominations of 2 and 5 piastres (p). Later issues did not include the word "syriennes" and were in denominations of 1/2p, 1p, 2p, 2 1/2p, 5p, 10p, 25p and 50p. During World War II, rather crudely made 1/2p, 1p and 2 1/2p coins were issued. Before the war all coins were minted in Paris.

After the war, the Arabic spelling was changed from girsh (غرش) to qirsh (قرش). Coins were issued in the period 1952 to 1986 in denominations of 1p, 2 1/2p, 5p, 10p, 25p, 50p and LL 1. No coins were issued between 1986 and 1994, when the current series of coins was introduced.

Coins in current use are:

Coins of the Lebanese pound
Image		Value	Technical parameters				Colour	Date of issue
Obverse	Reverse	Value	Diameter	Thickness	Mass	Metal	Colour	Date of issue
Coins no longer in circulation
		5p				Aluminium-bronze		1924
		5p				Aluminium-bronze		1925; 1931; 1933; 1936; 1940
		50p			10 g	Silver		1929; 1933; 1938
		5p	18 mm		2.2 g	Copper-nickel-aluminium	Golden yellow	1968; 1969; 1972; 1975
		10p	21 mm		3.2 g	Copper-nickel-aluminium	Golden yellow	1968; 1969; 1970; 1972; 1975
		25p	23.5 mm		4 g	Nickel-brass	Golden yellow	1968; 1969; 1970; 1972; 1975; 1980
		50p	24 mm		6 g	Nickel	White nickel	1968; 1969; 1970; 1971; 1975; 1978; 1980
		LL 1	27.5 mm		8 g	Nickel	White nickel	1975; 1977; 1980; 1981
		LL 1	27 mm		7.22 g	Nickel-plated steel	White nickel	1986
Coins in circulation
		LL 25	20.5 mm	1.3 mm	2.8 g	Nickel-plated steel	White nickel	2002
		LL 50	19 mm	1.15 mm	2.25 g	Stainless steel	White nickel	1996
		LL 50	21.5 mm	1.67 mm	3g	Nickel-plated steel	White nickel	2006
		LL 100	22.5 mm	1.80 mm	4 g	Zinc and copper	Red copper	1995; 1996; 2000
		LL 100	22.5 mm	1.83 mm	4 g	Steel and nickel	White	2003
		LL 100	22.5 mm	1.80 mm 1.60 mm	4 g	Steel and copper	Red copper	2006; 2009
		LL 250	23.5 mm	1.82 mm	5 g	Copper and aluminium	Yellow gold	1995; 1996; 2000; 2003
		LL 250	23.5 mm	1.65 mm	5 g	Nordic Gold	Nordic Gold	2006; 2009; 2012
		LL 500	24.5 mm	2.05 mm	6 g	Nickel-plated steel	White	1995; 1996; 2000; 2003; 2006; 2009; 2012; 2017
For table standards, see the coin specification table.

By January 2023, no coins are used anymore. All coins are worthless now due to inflation.

== Banknotes ==
LL 100 note of the 1964 series

Lebanon's first banknotes were issued by the Banque de Syrie et du Grand-Liban (Bank of Syria and Greater Lebanon) in 1925. Denominations ran from 25 piastres through to LL 100. In 1939, the bank's name was changed to the Bank of Syria and Lebanon. The first LL 250 notes appeared that year. Between 1942 and 1950, the government issued "small change" notes in denominations of 5p, 10p, 25p and 50p. After 1945, the Bank of Syria and Lebanon continued to issue paper money for Lebanon, but the notes were denominated specifically in "Lebanese pounds" (ليرة لبنانية, livre libanaise) to distinguish them from Syrian notes. Notes for LL 1, LL 5, LL 10, LL 25, LL 50 and LL 100 were issued.

The Banque du Liban (Bank of Lebanon) was established by the Code of Money and Credit on 1 April 1964. On 1 August 1963 decree No. 13.513 of the "Law of References: Banque Du Liban 23 Money and Credit" granted the Bank of Lebanon the sole right to issue notes in denominations of LL 1, LL 5, LL 10, LL 25, LL 50, LL 100, and LL 250, expressed in Arabic on the front, and French on the back. Higher denominations were issued in the 1980s and 1990s as inflation drastically reduced the currency's value.

Banknotes in current use are:

Circulating banknotes
Image		Value	Dimensions	Main colour	Date of issue
Obverse	Reverse				
		LL 1,000	156 × 67 mm	Teal	1988, 1990, 1991, 1992
		LL 1,000	115 × 60 mm	Teal	2011, 2012
		LL 1,000	115 × 60 mm	Teal	2004, 2008
		LL 5,000	156 × 67 mm	Pink	1994, 1995
		LL 5,000	140 × 70 mm	Pink	1999, 2001
		LL 5,000	120 × 62 mm	Pink	2004, 2008
		LL 5,000	120 × 62 mm	Pink	2012
		LL 10,000	145 × 73 mm	Yellow	1998
		LL 10,000	127 × 66 mm	Yellow	2004, 2008
		LL 10,000	127 × 66 mm	Yellow	2012
		LL 20,000	150 × 80 mm	Red	1994, 1995, 2001
		LL 20,000	130 × 72 mm	Red	2004
		LL 20,000	130 × 72 mm	Red	2012
		LL 50,000	150 × 80 mm	Blue	1994, 1995, 1999, 2001
		LL 50,000	140 × 77 mm	Blue	2004
		LL 50,000	140 × 77 mm	Blue	2011, 2012
		LL 100,000	161 × 90 mm	Green	1994, 1995, 1999, 2001
		LL 100,000	147 × 82 mm	Green	2004
		LL 100,000	147 × 82 mm	Green	2011, 2012
			135 x 66mm	Green	1 December 2023
For table standards, see the banknote specification table.

All current notes have a French side, which uses Western Arabic numerals, and a Modern Standard Arabic side, which uses Eastern Arabic numerals. The French side has a serial numbers written in two ways: one is in Arabic script and Eastern Arabic numerals, and the other is in the Latin script and Western Arabic numerals.

In 2023-2024 Banque du Liban introduced the new 100,000 LBP banknote with an updated signatures following changes in central bank leadership. In 2025 the Lebanese parliament approved the creation of new banknotes of - 500,000 LBP, 1,000,000 LBP, 2,000,000 LBP, 5,000,000 LBP.

== Higher denominations ==
With the highest bill of LL 100,000 only worth slightly more than $1 ( $1.117 ) there have been proposals to issue a LL 500,000 and later on, a LL 1,000,000.

== Devaluation ==
On 1 February 2023, Lebanon lowered its official exchange rate for the first time in 25 years, reducing it by 90%. Despite this significant change, the local currency remains considerably overvalued compared to its market value. A popular saying, "There is no value," is commonly used to refer to the substantial price changes that have characterized daily life since late 2019. Ever since, the exchange rate had forked into multiple distinct rates due to Lebanon's banking sector collapse. Within six months, five distinct Lebanese pound rates were defined against the US dollar, officially and unofficially. They were valued at:

- Official rate = 15,000 (February 2023). From December 1997 through January 2023, the exchange rate was fixed at LL 1,507.50 per US dollar. Since Lebanon's financial crisis of 2019 it became effectively obsolete. The official rate was increased by a multiple of 9.95 on 1 February 2023 as per decision of the central bank to reach LL 15,000 per USD.
- Lebanon's Central Bank's "Sayrafa" rate = LL 89,500 (Dec 2023). The Sayrafa rate is the rate the central bank redeems international credit and debit card payments.
- "Lollar" (bank withdrawals of US$ in LL) = LL 15,000.
- Parallel market rate = LL 89,601.44 (May 2024).

The parallel (or black) market rate was significantly higher than the official exchange rate. Due to extensive dollarization of the economy, the money supply stabilized, so depreciation of the Lebanese pound was effectively halted. The official exchange rate was set to LL 89,500 per USD in 2024.

=== Lollar ===
The "lollar" is a deposit denominated in US dollars in the Lebanese banking system. It is a nominal balance stuck or frozen in the Lebanese banks, with currency value simply as a computer entry. The lollar is not a tangible currency, but is a concept of an outstanding deposit in US dollars in Lebanese banks that can only be withdrawn in Lebanese pounds at a very reduced set rate and considerably lower than the highly speculative black market rate, which is multiple times higher. There are also limits put on the total amount that can be withdrawn on the lollars. The term was coined by Harvard University economic fellow Dan Azzi after the Lebanese banks suffered serious difficulties and restricted the amount of US dollars and other foreign currencies they could pay to their depositors.

== Causes and effects of the economic crisis ==
The Lebanese financial crisis drew widespread attention in October 2019, as numerous Lebanese citizens took over the streets and initiated the "Thawra" protest. Nevertheless, the economic predicament had been deteriorating for several years. The central bank implemented rigorous restrictions on withdrawals from foreign exchange accounts as they encountered significant difficulties in maintaining the value of the lira. This affected approximately 75% of all bank deposits. The major cause of the economic crisis was the implementation of the de facto capital controls, which greatly impacted the financial stability of the country.

The crisis had various effects on Lebanon and its people. They have encountered several challenges over the last few years, including the introduction of extra official rates for specific transactions, hyperinflation, a sharp decline in the gross domestic product (GDP), which resulted in shutdown of businesses and a higher rate of unemployment. Additionally, Lebanon faced the impact of the COVID-19 pandemic, which was then followed by the devastating 2020 Beirut explosion on August 4, 2020.

Transitioning to the U.S. dollar as the official currency is seen as an essential measure to address the ongoing severe crisis. In December 2025 The Ministry of Finance has issued a circular mandating individuals and legal entities to declare and pay taxes on profits earned from Sayrafa platform transactions, in accordance with Article 93 of the 2024 state budget law. Taxpayers whose total transactions exceeded $15,000 between 2021 and 2023 must settle the exceptional tax and penalties by January 15, 2026, to avoid tax evasion charges. After the deadline, authorities will audit data received from Banque du Liban and other bodies, and non-compliant taxpayers will be referred to the financial public prosecutor.

== See also ==
- Economy of Lebanon
- Syrian pound

Current LBP exchange rates
From Google Finance:	AUD CAD CHF CNY EUR GBP HKD JPY USD TRY
From Yahoo! Finance:	AUD CAD CHF CNY EUR GBP HKD JPY USD TRY
From XE.com:	AUD CAD CHF CNY EUR GBP HKD JPY USD TRY
From OANDA:	AUD CAD CHF CNY EUR GBP HKD JPY USD TRY
