= Syrian pound =

Currency of Syria

الليرة السورية (Arabic)

ISO 4217
- Code: SYP (numeric: 760)
- Subunit: 0.01

Units of account
- Symbol: None official. The abbreviations LS, SP, or ل.س are used.
- Subunit
- 1/100: piastre (p)

Denominations
- Banknotes: LS 10, LS 25, LS 50, LS 100, LS 200, LS 500
- Coins: -

Demographics
- Date of introduction: 1919
- User(s): Syria

Issuance
- Central bank: Central Bank of Syria
- Website: cb.gov.sy

Valuation
- Inflation: 11.3%
- Source: November 2025 est.
- Value: US$1 = LS 111.00 €1 = LS 129.73 (As of January 5, 2026)

The Syrian pound, known locally as the Syrian lira, (Arabic: الليرة السورية, romanized: al-Līra as-Sūriyyah; abbreviation: LS or SP (Note: The Central Bank of Syria uses this abbreviation on the security strips of banknotes.) in Latin, ل.س in Arabic, historically also £S, and £Syr; ISO code: SYP) is the official currency of Syria. It is issued by the Central Bank of Syria. The pound is nominally divided into 100 piastres (قرش qirsh, plural قروش qurūsh in Arabic, abbreviated to p.). Only banknotes are currently issued.

Before 1947, the Arabic inscription of the word "qirsh" was spelled with the initial Arabic letter غ, after which the word began with ق. Until 1958, banknotes were issued with Arabic on the obverse and French on the reverse. Since 1958, English has been used on the reverses, hence the three different names for this currency. Coins used both Arabic and French until independence, then only Arabic.

== History ==
=== French mandate ===
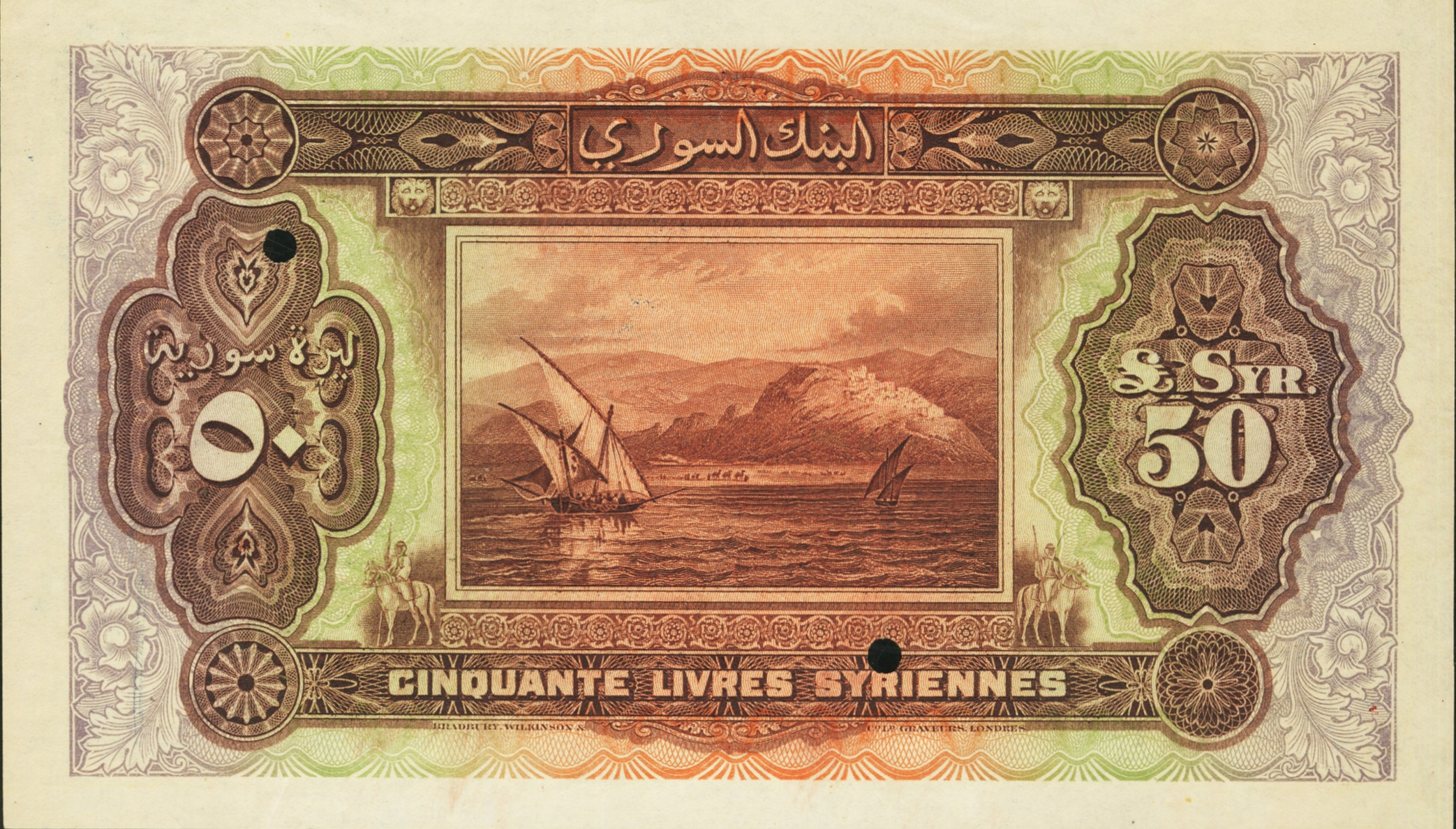
50 Syrian pound banknote of 1920

During the period when Syria was a part of the Ottoman Empire, which lasted about 400 years, the Ottoman pound was its main currency. Following the fall of the Ottoman Empire and the placing of Syria under a mandate (French occupation), the Egyptian pound was used in the territories under French and British mandates, including Lebanon, Transjordan and Palestine. Upon taking Lebanon and Syria under its separate mandate, the French government sought to replace the Egyptian currency and granted a commercial bank, the Banque de Syrie (a French affiliate of the Ottoman Bank), the authority to issue a currency for territories under its new mandate.

The pound (or livre in French) was introduced in 1919 and was set at a value of 20 francs. As the political status of Lebanon evolved, the Banque de Syrie, which was to act as the official bank for Lebanon and Syria, was renamed the Banque de Syrie et du Grand-Liban (BSL). BSL issued the Syro-Lebanese pound for 15 years, starting in 1924. Two years before the expiration of the 15-year period, BSL split the Lebanese-Syrian currency into two separate currencies that could still be used interchangeably in either state. In 1939, the bank was renamed the Banque de Syrie et du Liban.

In 1941, the peg to the French franc was replaced by a peg to sterling of LS 8.83125 = £1, as a consequence of the occupation of Syria by British and Free French forces. This rate was based on the pre-war conversion rate between the franc and sterling. In 1946, following devaluation of the franc, the pound was pegged once again to the franc at a rate of LS 1 = 54.35 F. In 1947, Syria joined the International Monetary Fund (IMF) and pegged its currency to the U.S. dollar at LS 2.19148 = US$1, a rate which was maintained until 1961.

=== Independence ===
The Lebanese and Syrian currencies split in 1948. From 1961, a series of official exchange rates were in operation, alongside a parallel, black market rate which reflected the true market rate for Syrian pounds in Jordan and Lebanon where there was a healthy trade in the Syrian currency.

=== Ba'athist Syria ===
The Syrian pound had stayed unchanged following the seizure of power by the Ba'athists in 1963. Despite this, the market was allowed to flourish because everybody, including government and public sector companies, needed it. The black market rate diverged dramatically from the official rate in the 1980s. In July 2007, the currency was pegged to the IMF SDR (Special Drawing Rights).

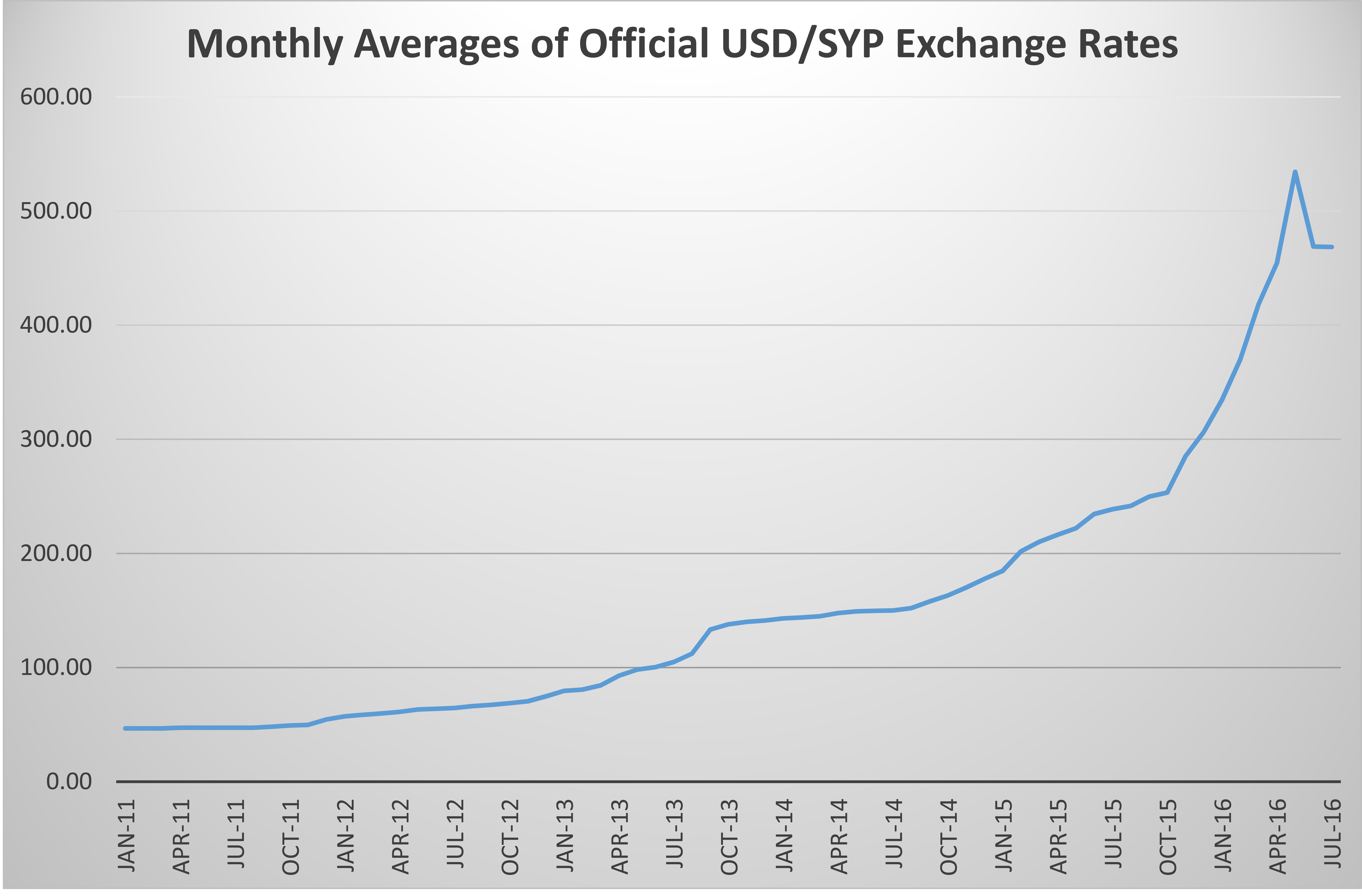
Monthly averages of Official USD:SYP Exchange rate from January 2011 to July 2016

There was a capital flight to nearby countries, including Lebanon, Jordan, Egypt and Turkey, as a result of the Syrian civil war that started in 2011. In addition, Syria has been subject to sanctions imposed by the United States, the European Union and other countries, which shut Syria out of the global financial system. To circumvent the sanctions, Syrians effected foreign transactions through banks in neighbouring countries, especially Lebanon. As a result, the official exchange rate has deteriorated significantly, falling from LS 47 = US$1 in March 2011 to LS 515 = US$1 in July 2017 and 7500 = US$1 in April 2023 (after the Lebanese liquidity crisis)

On 31 October 2019, Syrian President Bashar al-Assad mentioned in an interview that liberating territories had complex economic consequences. While it removed foreign-funded support for terrorists, it also cut off dollar inflows that stabilize local economies:

One factor which people are not aware of, is that the liberation of an area does not necessarily serve the Syrian pound, because by liberating an area, we are removing its access to dollars which were paid to the terrorists to cover their needs and expenses. This is one of the tools we benefited from. I mean that things are not absolute, and we cannot say that terrorists were serving us in this regard. Not every positive step has a positive impact. That is why I am saying that the issue is complicated.

— Bashar Al-Assad

=== Post-Assad reforms ===
Following the fall of the Assad regime at the end of 2024, Syrian President Ahmed al-Sharaa, who led the Syrian transitional government, stated that he intended to replace the Syrian pound with a new currency once the currency had stabilized.

In August 2025, it was announced that the Syrian government would revalue the currency by removing two zeros and issuing new banknotes by December. Syrian authorities reconfirmed this plan in October but with the date pushed back to 2026.

On 29 December 2025, the Central Bank of Syria unveiled the new Syrian Pound denominations alongside President Ahmed al-Sharaa at the 'New Syria Banknotes Reveal Event' in Damascus. Some of the executive instructions related to Decree No. 293 of 2025, which reference the new currency, were released earlier the same day. The new denominations began circulating in the general public on 3 January 2026. By 4 May, 56% of the old currency had been replaced. By 1 June, 63% had been replaced, and by 30 July, 95% had been replaced, which ended the replacement of the Syrian pound.

== Coins ==
In 1921, cupro-nickel 1/2 piastre coins were introduced, followed in 1926 by aluminium bronze 2p and 5p. In 1929, holed, nickel-brass 1p and silver 10p, 25p and 50p were introduced. Nickel-brass 1/2p coins were introduced 1935, followed by zinc 1pt and aluminium-bronze 2 1/2p in 1940. During the Second World War, brass 1p and aluminium 2 1/2p emergency coins were issued. These pieces were crudely produced and undated.

A new coinage was introduced between 1947 and 1948 in denominations of 2 1/2p, 5p, 10p, 25p, 50p and LS 1, with the 2 1/2p, 5p and 10p struck in cupro-nickel and the others in silver. Aluminium-bronze replaced cupro-nickel in 1960, with nickel replacing silver in 1968. In 1996, following high inflation, new coins were introduced in denominations of LS 1, LS 2, LS 5, LS 10 and LS 25, with the LS 25 being bimetallic. In 2003, LS 5, LS 10, and LS 25 coins were issued, with latent images. On December 26, 2018, the Central Bank of Syria introduced a LS 50 coin for general circulation to replace the banknote of that denomination. Due to high inflation, only the 50p coin is in circulation. All other coins were worthless by December of 2022.

== Banknotes ==
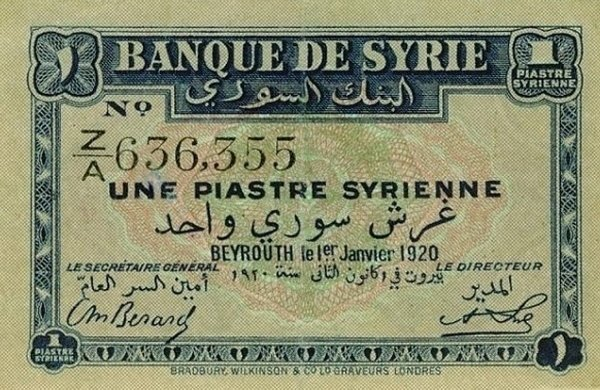
1p note issued in 1920

In 1919, the Banque de Syrie introduced notes for 5p, 25p and 50p, LS 1 and LS 5. These were followed, in 1920, by notes for LS 1, LS 10, LS 25, LS 50 and LS 100. In 1925, the Banque de Syrie et du Grand-Liban began issuing notes and production of denominations below 25p ceased. Notes below LS 1 were not issued from 1930. In 1939, the issuing body again changed its name, to the Banque de Syrie et du Liban.

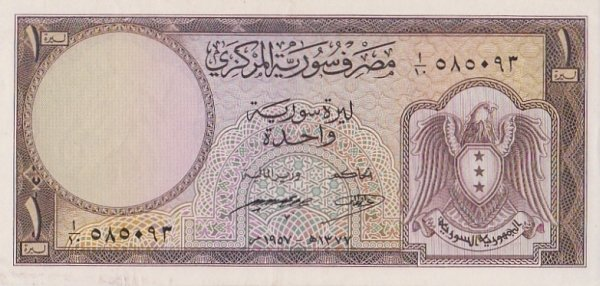
LS 1 note issued in 1957

Between 1942 and 1944, the government introduced notes for 5p, 10p, 25p and 50p. In the early 1950s, undated notes were issued by the Institut d'Emission de Syrie in denominations of LS 1, LS 5, LS 10, LS 25, LS 50 and LS 100, followed by notes dated 1955 for LS 10 and LS 25. The Banque Centrale de Syrie took over paper money issuance in 1957, issuing the same denominations as the Institut d'Emission.

In 1958, the French language was removed from banknotes and replaced by English. Notes were issued for LS 1, LS 5, LS 10, LS 25, LS 50, LS 100 and LS 500. In 1966, the design of the LS 25, LS 50, and LS 100 notes were changed. In 1976 and 1977, the designs changed for all the denominations except the LS 500 note.

In 1997 and 1998, a new series of notes was introduced in denominations of LS 50, LS 100, LS 200, LS 500 and LS 1,000, with the lower denominations replaced by coins. In 2009, the LS 50, LS 100, and LS 200 pound notes were changed with an entirely new design. On 2 July 2014, a new LS 500 note was introduced, followed by a LS 1,000 note on 30 July 2015, a LS 2,000 note on 2 July 2017, and a LS 5,000 note on 24 January 2021.

=== 2009–2025 series ===
On 27 July 2010, the Central Bank of Syria issued a new series of banknotes dated 2009 in the denominations of LS 50, LS 100, and LS 200. The notes were designed by Austrian banknote designer Robert Kalina. The Central Bank of Syria issued new LS 500 and LS 1,000 notes in 2014 and 2015, respectively. The reverse of the new LS 1,000 note features an image of a Roman mosaic painting discovered in Deir al-Adas. Then-President Bashar al-Assad was added to the LS 2,000 note in 2017. A LS 5,000 note was released in 2021

2009–2025 series of the Syrian pound
Value	Dimensions (millimeters)	Main color	Description		Year of first issue	Issue date	Withdrawal date
Value	Dimensions (millimeters)	Main color	Obverse	Reverse	Year of first issue	Issue date	Withdrawal date
LS 50	135 × 65	Gray	A rectangular Ugarit tablet of first Abjad, and a circular Ebla tablet	National Library and a statue of former President Hafez al-Assad	2009	27 July 2010	30 July 2026
LS 100	140 x 65	Red	Basalt stone gate and Bosra amphitheater	The dome of the Treasury of the Umayyad Mosque, Central Bank of Syria, ancient coin of Philip the Arab	2009	27 July 2010	30 July 2026
LS 200	145 x 65	Orange	Norias of Hama	Ceiling of Temple of Bel (Palmyra)	2009	27 July 2010	30 July 2026
LS 500	150 x 65	Blue	Damascus Opera House	"Mosaic of the Musicians" from a Byzantine villa in Maryamin. The clay tablet depicts the Hurrian songs	2013	20 July 2014	30 July 2026
LS 1000	155 x 65	Green	Roman Theatre at Bosra	Roman mosaic of a grape harvest in Deir al-Adas	2013	30 July 2015	30 July 2026
LS 2000	158 x 65	Purple	Then-president Bashar al-Assad and the Umayyad Mosque	People's Assembly	2015	2 July 2017	30 July 2026
LS 5000	158 x 65	Brown	Syrian soldier statue and the Ba'athist Syrian flag	Eagle and Yarhibol resco from the Temple of Baalshamin (Palmyra)	2019	24 January 2021	30 July 2026

=== 2026 series ===
The new currency was launched on 1 January 2026, and is being issued entirely in paper denominations. In the first phase, six denominations will be launched: LS 500, LS 200, LS 100, LS 50, LS 25, and LS 10. In the second phase, three denominations will be launched: LS 1,000, LS 5, and LS 1.

Under the plan, every 100 Syrian pounds is now exchanged for one unit of the new Syrian Arab Republic pound. Both the old and new currencies remained in circulation simultaneously for a period of 90 days, then they were later extended until 30 July 2026, by which time the exchange of the old banknotes was completed.

Current series (2026)
Image	Value	Dimensions (mm)	Main colour	Description		Year of first issue	Issued from
Image	Value	Dimensions (mm)	Main colour	Obverse	Reverse	Year of first issue	Issued from
	LS 1	158 × 65					
	LS 5	158 × 65					
	LS 10	158 × 65	Red	Roses; Butterfly	Central bank building; Umayyad Mosque treasury	2025	1 January 2026
	LS 25	158 × 65	Blue	Mulberries; House sparrow	Central bank building; Umayyad Mosque treasury	2025	1 January 2026
	LS 50	158 × 65	Orange	Citrus; Seashell	Central bank building; Umayyad Mosque treasury	2025	1 January 2026
	LS 100	158 × 65	Purple	Cottons; Gazelle	Central bank building; Umayyad Mosque treasury	2025	1 January 2026
	LS 200	158 × 65	Green	Olives; Arabian horse	Central bank building; Umayyad Mosque treasury	2025	1 January 2026
	LS 500	158 × 65	Brown	Wheats; House sparrow	Central bank building; Umayyad Mosque treasury	2025	1 January 2026
	LS 1000	158 × 65					
For table standards, see the banknote specification table.

== Exchange rate ==
On 5 December 2005, the selling rate quoted by the Commercial Bank of Syria was LS 48.4 = US$1. A rate of about LS 50 to US$1 was usual in the early 2000s, but the rate is subject to fluctuations. Since the start of the civil war in 2011, the pound's unofficial exchange rate has deteriorated significantly. It was LS 47 = US$1 in March 2011 and LS 515 in July 2017. Since July 2007, the Syrian pound has been pegged to the IMF SDR (Special Drawing Rights).

On 29 November 2019, following the Lebanese protests, the black market rate was LS 765 = US$1, a decrease of 30% since the turmoil started in Lebanon a month earlier, as the protests led Lebanese banks to impose tight controls on hard currency withdrawals and transfers abroad, making it hard for Syrians to access funds held by them in those banks.

The black-market rate fell to LS 950 on 2 December 2019, another 25% decrease, while the official rate set by the central bank was LS 434 = US$1.

On 13 January 2020, the currency deteriorated further, as more than LS 1,000 was traded for US$1 in the black market, despite being valued at LS 434 = US$1 by the Syrian Central Bank. During the COVID-19 pandemic in Syria, the Syrian pound continued to fall against the U.S. dollar in the black market, where US$1 equaled more than LS 1,600 in May 2020. A month later, the Syrian pound passed LS 2,000 against the dollar, and a few days later, it passed LS 3,000 against the dollar.

Upon the implementation of the U.S. sanctions related to the Caesar Act, anti-government local authorities in Idlib Governorate adopted the Turkish lira in place of the plummeting Syrian pound. The lira has also replaced the Syrian pound in other Turkish occupied areas of northern Syria, such as Afrin and Jarabulus.

On 31 December 2022, the Syrian pound hit a new record low again on the black market, where each US$1 cost LS 7,150, twice as much as a year before. In 2023, the exchange rate continued deterioration, reaching LS 15,000 per US$1.

During the 2024 Syrian opposition offensives, the exchange rate fell to a record low of LS 25,000 per US$1. After the fall of the Assad regime, the currency was traded between LS 12,500 and 10,000 per US$1.

=== Links for current rates ===
Current SYP exchange rates
From Google Finance:	AUD CAD CHF CNY EUR GBP HKD JPY USD TRY JOD
From Yahoo! Finance:	AUD CAD CHF CNY EUR GBP HKD JPY USD TRY JOD
From XE.com:	AUD CAD CHF CNY EUR GBP HKD JPY USD TRY JOD
From OANDA:	AUD CAD CHF CNY EUR GBP HKD JPY USD TRY JOD

== See also ==
- Economy of Syria
- Lebanese pound
