= Banque de l'Union Parisienne =

French Investment Bank

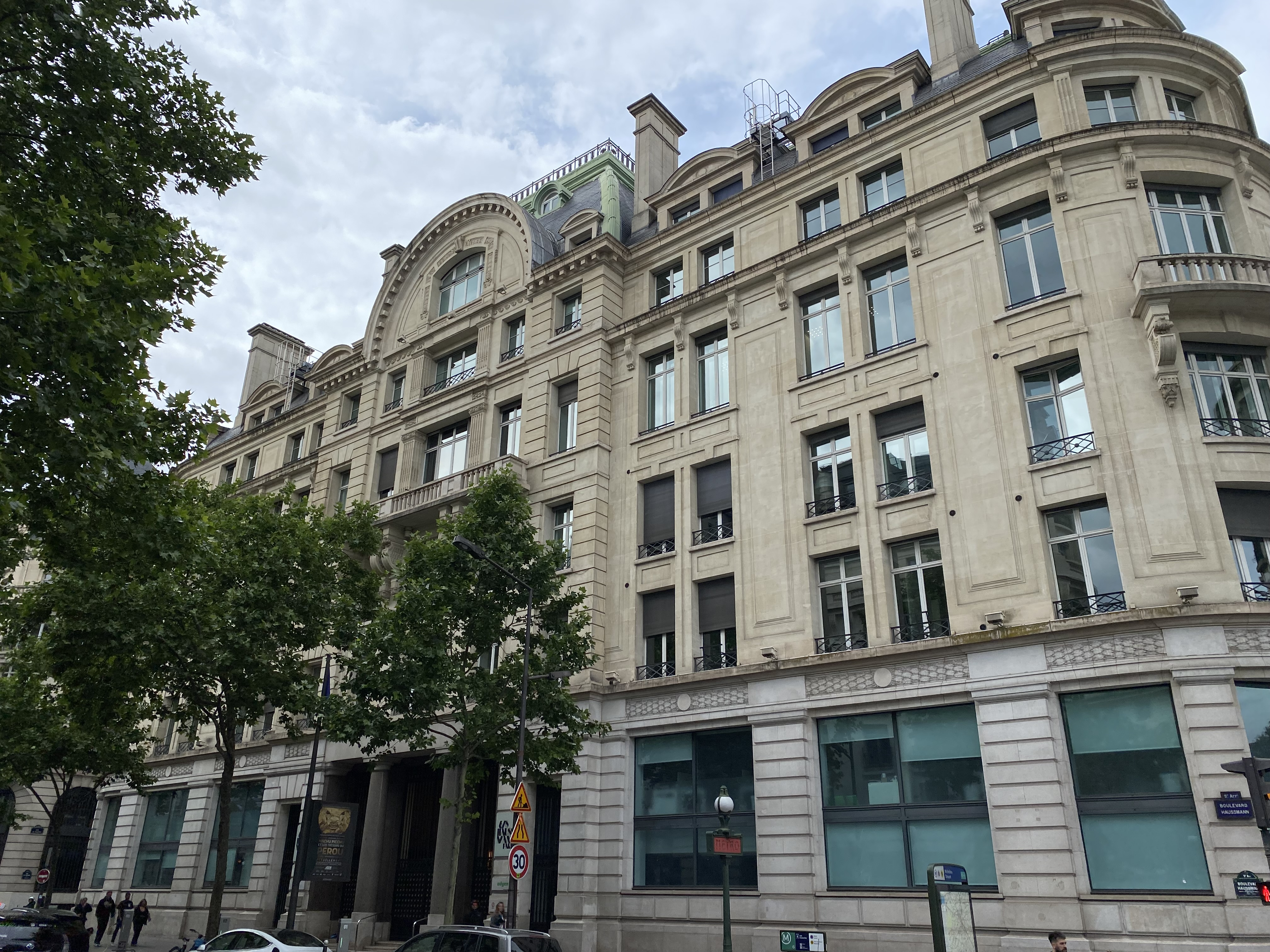
- Former seat of the BUP at 6, boulevard Haussmann in Paris
- Industry: Investment banking
- Founded: Paris, France (5 January 1904)
- Defunct: 1973
- Successor: Crédit du Nord; Crédit du Nord
- Headquarters: Paris, France

The Banque de l'Union Parisienne (French pronunciation: [bɑ̃k də lynjɔ̃ paʁizjɛn], BUP) was a French investment bank, created in 1904 and merged into Crédit du Nord in 1973.

== History ==
=== Société Française et Belge de Banque et d'Escompte ===
From its inception, the Société Générale de Belgique (SGB) had a branch in Paris. This was later restructured as a banking subsidiary, called the Société Française et Belge de Banque et d'Escompte (lit. 'French and Belgian Banking and Discount Company'), of which the SGB held three-quarters of the capital.

=== Banque Parisienne ===
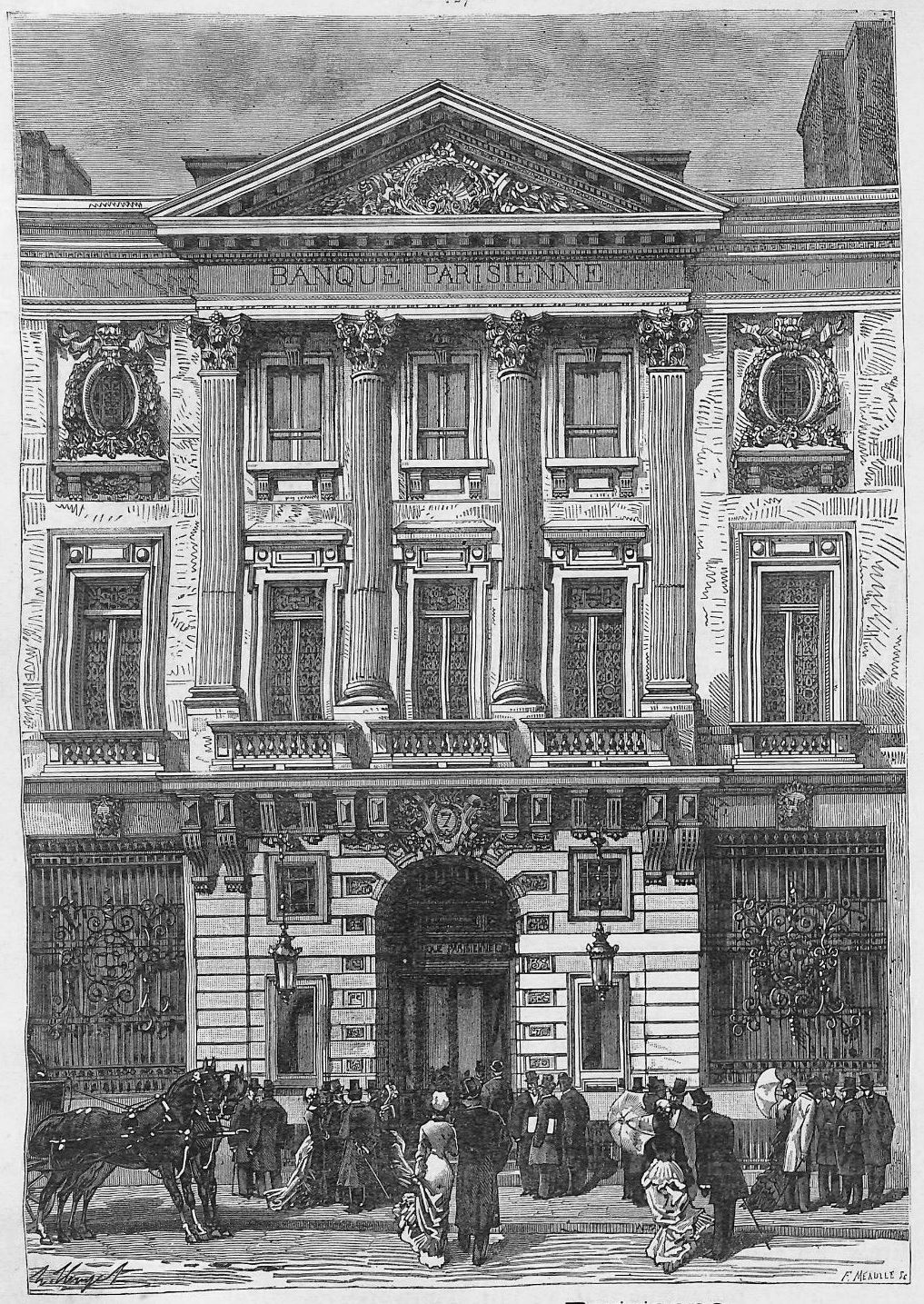
Engraving of the headquarters of Banque Parisienne at 7, rue Chauchat, late 1870s

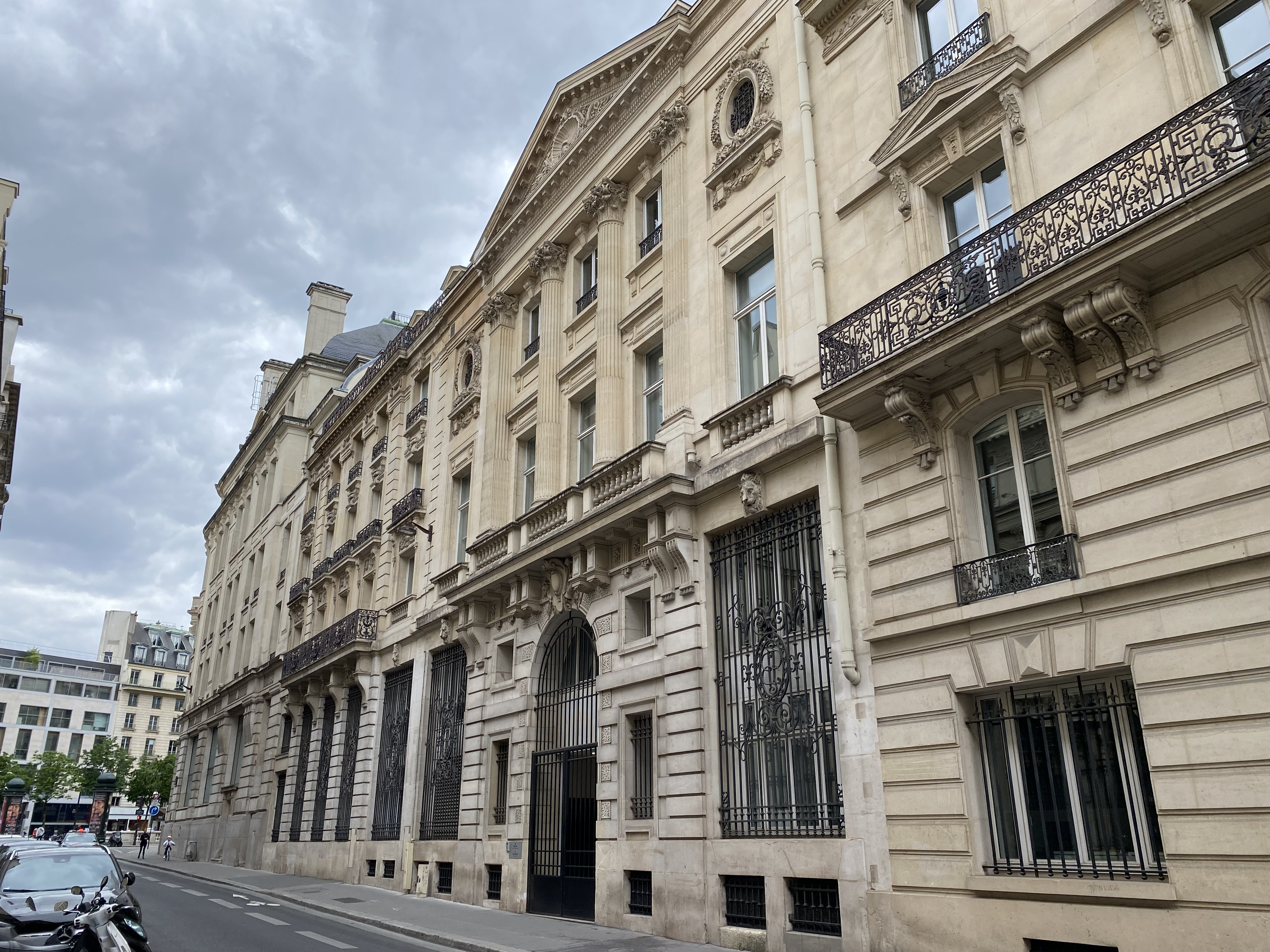
The same building in 2022, with the main BUP headquarters wing on boulevard Haussmann in the background

The Banque Parisienne was founded in 1874 and mainly engaged in discounting commercial paper. In the financial and economic crisis of the late 1880s, it ran into liquidity problems, which were resolved by an injection of cash from the Société Générale de Belgique. With this new partner, the Banque Parisienne moved into the business of launching and trading securities for French companies, mostly based in Paris, for companies in countries such as Portugal and China, and for governments. The business proved profitable, but the company lacked the capital needed for faster growth.

=== Banque de l'Union Parisienne ===
In 1904, the Société Générale de Belgique (SGB) arranged with a number of private Parisian banks to establish a new institution, the Banque de l'Union Parisienne. The SGB provided half of the capital for the new venture, including by bringing it the Société Française et Belge. Its partners were Hottinger & Cie, Banque Mirabaud, Banque de Neuflize, Banque Mallet, and Banque Vernes.

It was expected that the new bank would soon become the second French investment bank after the Banque de Paris et des Pays-Bas, and that it would represent the interests of Schneider-Creusot.

The Banque de l'Union Parisienne was founded on 5 January 1904, with initial capital of 40 million francs. Société Générale de Belgique held 15%. The house of Demachy later took a share of the capital, which steadily grew to 200 million francs by 1929. The institution was mainly owned by French and foreign banks, with few individual shareholders, but there were a few institutional investors and high-net-worth individuals.

Baron Ferdinand Baeyens, governor on the Société Générale, was administrator of the BUP from 1904 until his retirement in October 1913, when Jean Jadot assumed both positions. The bank grew rapidly and profitably in the years following its foundation, with successive expansions of its capital base. It survived a financial crisis in 1907 and an economic crisis in 1913, a year in which its capital was raised to 80 million francs.

The Banque de l'Union Parisienne invested in a wide range of enterprises in France. It helped with the launch and expansion of Messageries Maritimes (shipping), Ericsson (telephones), De Dion-Bouton (cars), and so on. The BUP would lend capital as required for growth, recovering it through sales of shares when the market was strong. Typically the BUP would have a presence on the board of the enterprise. The bank became closely involved with the industrial giant Schneider, helping financing in Russia, Morocco, and other countries. Some of the Schneider enterprises ran into difficulties, and from 1927 relations with the bank were strained, with a final break in 1929.

The bank invested in the Compagnie Française des Pétroles (now Total S.A.), holding about 13% of the capital, while Paribas held 19%. Another major investment was with Citroën, which was having trouble finding investors due to its unorthodox management and poor profitability. The bank also provided corporate banking and investment banking services around the world, mostly for French companies involved in mining, oil exploitation, transportation and infrastructure.

The bank suffered major losses with World War I, and lost all its assets in Russia. It also faced strong competition from other banks, and further difficulties with the economic crisis of the 1930s. It was particularly exposed to enterprises in the industrial north of France and in the Balkans. With governments failing to reimburse their bonds, and with companies with which it was involved going bankrupt, the bank's viability came into question as losses mounted in the 1930s. The Banque de France was unwilling to see the BUP go out of business, and managed to assemble investors to recapitalize the bank. In May 1932, the BUP was shored up by a merger with the Crédit Mobilier Français, supported by the SGB. By 1938 the turnaround was complete. However, the BUP continued to hold high-risk investments in France and abroad. World War II halted the bank's recovery, and caused fresh losses to German banks in Central and Eastern Europe.

After the war ended in 1945, the BUP avoided nationalization and participated profitably in funding reconstruction. The Société générale de Belgique withdrew its capital, but the BUP compensated by absorbing the Mirabaud bank. It provided credit to many enterprises, and gained wealthy depositors. The bank also diversified into retail credit. The bank expanded in Latin America, but withdrew from Central and Eastern Europe. In 1960 it purchased the Compagnie Algérienne.

On 6 March 1963 Henri Lafond, the bank's president, was assassinated. In 1964 the bank was subject to takeover attempts by Baron Édouard-Jean Empain, owner of the Banque de l'Union Européenne (BUE), and the Balkany family, supported by the Vernes bank. To fight off these challenges, the bank requested help from the Compagnie Financière de Suez. This enterprise bought the shares of both the companies seeking to take over the bank, emerging with a 21% share. On 1 January 1967, Suez absorbed the Banque de l'Union Parisienne.

The new Banque de l'Union Parisienne-Compagnie Française de Crédit et de Banque (BUP-CFCB) became a deposit bank. By 1973 it had 170 branches, and 115 offices in affiliated banks. The bank continued to provide wealth management services, and offered the first mutual funds in France, while continuing to finance companies. Through a subsidiary it was involved in real estate construction and leasing. In 1971 Suez and Paribas, which had been engaged in a struggle for control of Crédit Industriel et Commercial, came to an agreement that included the transfer of the bank to Paribas. On 26 September 1973 the BUP merged with the Crédit du Nord as the Crédit du Nord-BUP. In 1976 the merged company reverted to the name of Crédit du Nord.

== Leadership ==
- Lucien Villars, Chairman 1904-1920
- Charles Sergent, Chairman 1921-1936
- Jean Tannery, Chairman 1936-1939
- Paul Bavière, Chairman 1939-1951 and CEO 1940-1951
- Henri Lafond, Chairman & CEO 1951-1963
- Emmanuel Lamy, Chairman & CEO 1963-1973

== Parisian head office ==
Following the Banque Parisienne's liquidation in 1904, the BUP took over its head office building at 5-7, rue Chauchat in Paris. It then acquired a number of nearby properties, at 14, rue Le Peletier in 1905; 12, rue Le Peletier in 1909; 16, rue Le Peletier, 15, rue Rossini, and 9, rue Chauchat in 1913; 8-10, rue Le Peletier in December 1923; and on the newly extended Boulevard Haussmann in December 1925. As a consequence, the BUP owned the entire city block, which it remodeled between 1926 and 1932 with a new wing fronting the Boulevard, designed by architect Pierre Figarol. In the meantime, the Banque Franco-Serbe and the Banque de Syrie, both offshoots of the Imperial Ottoman Bank, had used BUP properties on that block as their head offices, respectively 14, rue Le Peletier from 1910 to the early 1920s, and 16, rue Le Peletier from 1919 to 1927. The building has been used by Bpifrance as its downtown Paris office since 2013.

== See also ==
- List of banks in France
