= Banque Franco-Serbe =

French bank founded in 1910

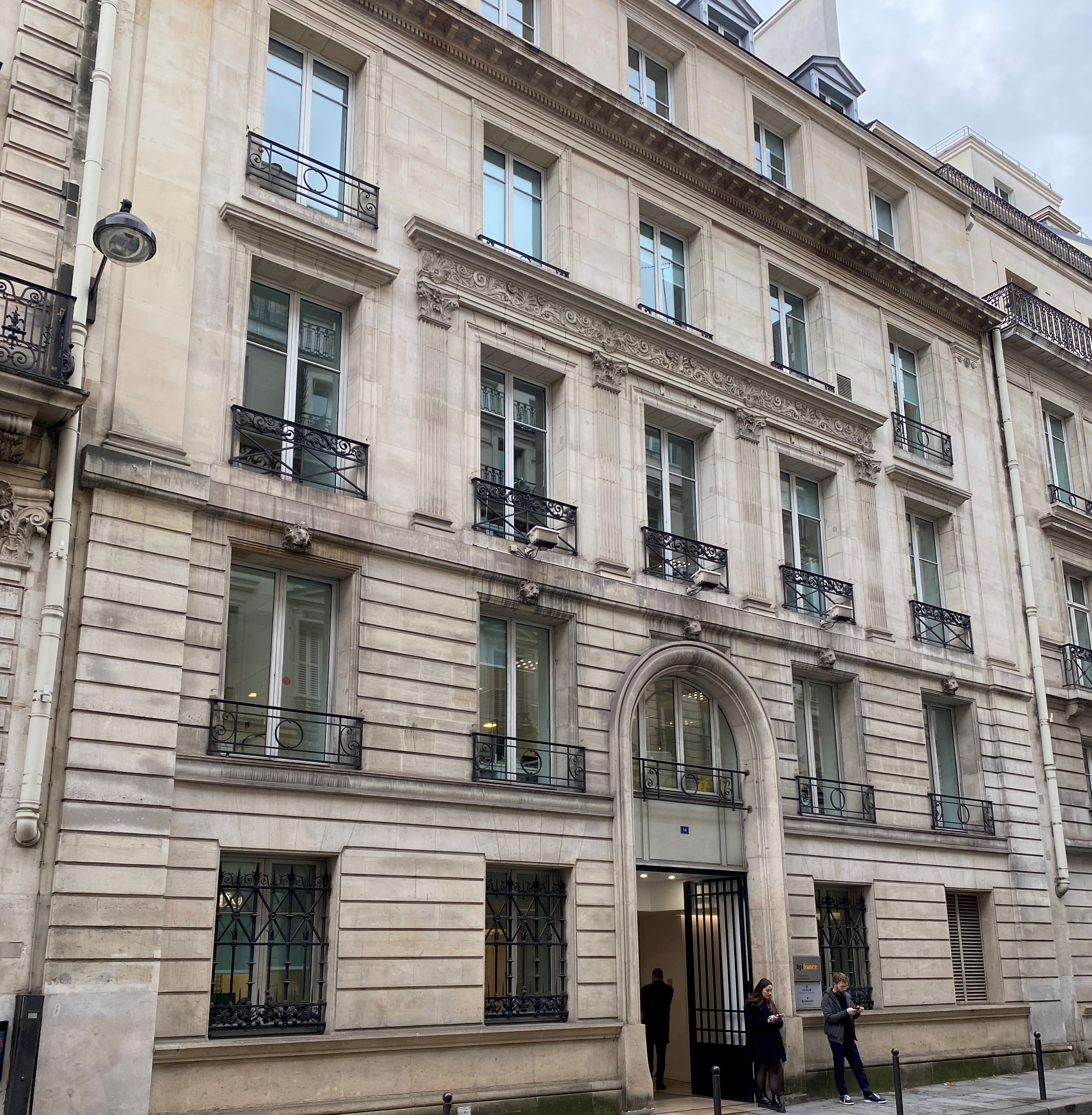
Building at 14, rue Le Peletier in Paris, BFS head office from 1910 to the early 1920s

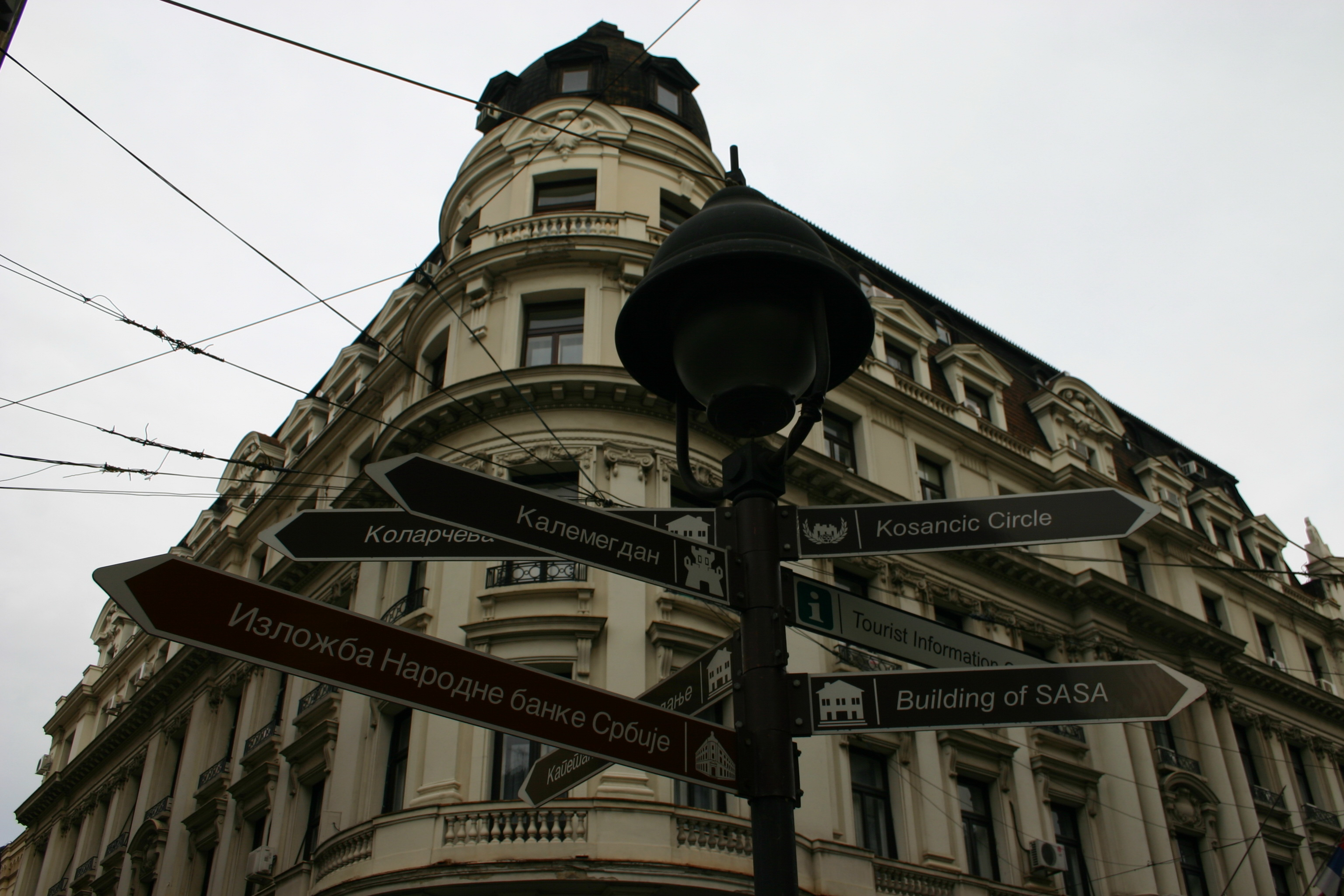
Belgrade branch of the BFS on Knez Mihailova Street, completed in 1922; now a branch of Erste Bank Serbia

The Banque Franco-Serbe (French pronunciation: [bɑ̃k fʁɑ̃ko sɛʁb], "French-Serbian Bank", abbr. BFS) was a French bank founded in 1910 to support French projects in the Kingdom of Serbia. It was a major financial institution in Serbia, then the Kingdom of Serbs, Croats and Slovenes and Kingdom of Yugoslavia until World War II.

== History ==
The Banque Franco-Serbe was created in 1910 by a group of French-linked financial institutions, mainly the Imperial Ottoman Bank of Constantinople (known by its French acronym BIO), the Banque de l'Union parisienne (BUP) of Paris, and the Société financière d’Orient of Brussels, the latter of which had been created by the BIO in 1896 to support markets for Ottoman securities in which it had troubled exposures. The Paris-based Société Générale and Bardac family bank also participated. While the BFS's registered head office was in Paris, its general management was located at the branch in Belgrade from the start; it also soon opened an office in London. At its creation, it was the only significant commercial bank in Serbia (even though the state-run Uprava Fondova was larger) and played a central role in the foreign funding of Serbia's war effort during the Balkan Wars.

In the wake of the Serbian territorial gains at the Treaty of Bucharest (1913), the BFS in 1914 took over the former BIO branches in Bitola and Skopje. During World War I, its activity in Serbia was suspended and its local gold reserves were shipped by the French Navy to Marseille via Thessaloniki. By 1925, it had additional branches in Fiume, Thessaloniki, and Zagreb, and by 1930 also in Niš. Following financial difficulties, the BIO, by then controlled by the Banque de Paris et des Pays-Bas (BPPB), became the BFS's majority owner through a capital restructuring in 1928.

The BFS's Parisian head office was initially established in a building that had been acquired by the BUP in 1905 at 14, rue Le Peletier, and moved in the early 1920s to a new building at 100, rue de la Victoire.

By the late 1930s, the BFS was the only foreign-headquartered bank with large direct operations in Yugoslavia. It had branches in Bitola, Kosovska Mitrovica, Niš, and Skopje. Following the Axis invasion of Yugoslavia in 1941, its activities withered and it lost its significant business in Macedonia. The operations of the BFS in Yugoslavia were nationalized by the Communist authorities by December 1946, together with all other banks in the country, and merged into the National Bank of Yugoslavia. The French entity kept existing until at least the 1970s as a subsidiary of the BPPB.

== Leadership ==
- Arsène Henry, Chairman 1910–1928
- Raoul Mallet, Chairman 1928–1937
- Frédéric Pillet-Will (son of the namesake financier), Chairman 1937–1939
- Félix Bellet, Chairman 1939-?
- Philippe Mallet, chairman and Chief Executive 1948-1973

== Gallery ==
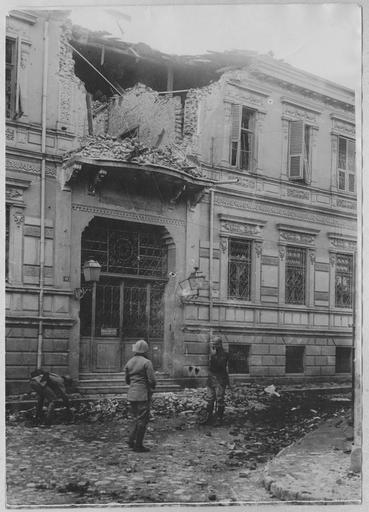
Bitola branch building in January 1917, damaged by fighting on the Macedonian front of World War I

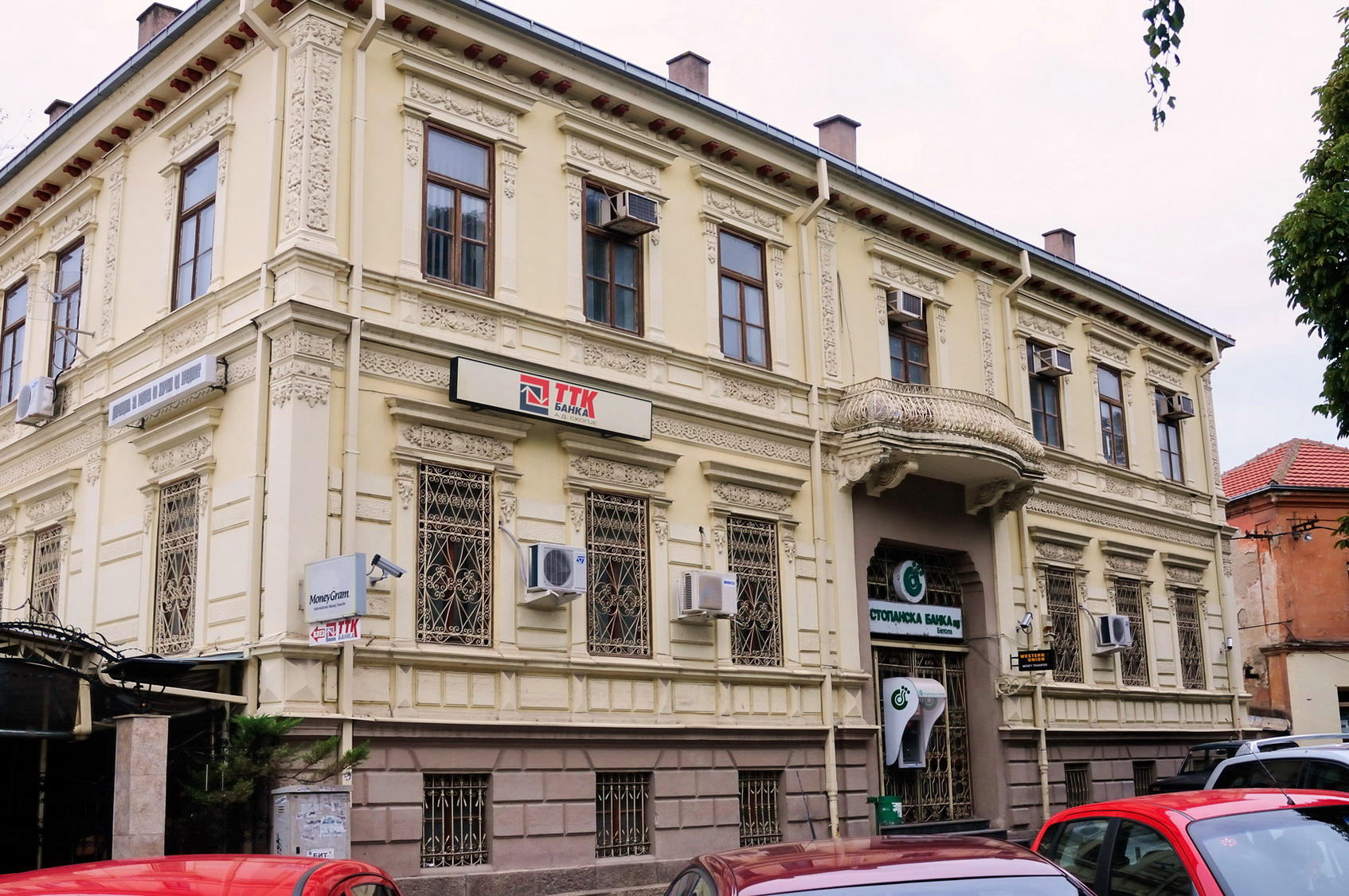
The same building in 2014, now a branch of Stopanska Banka

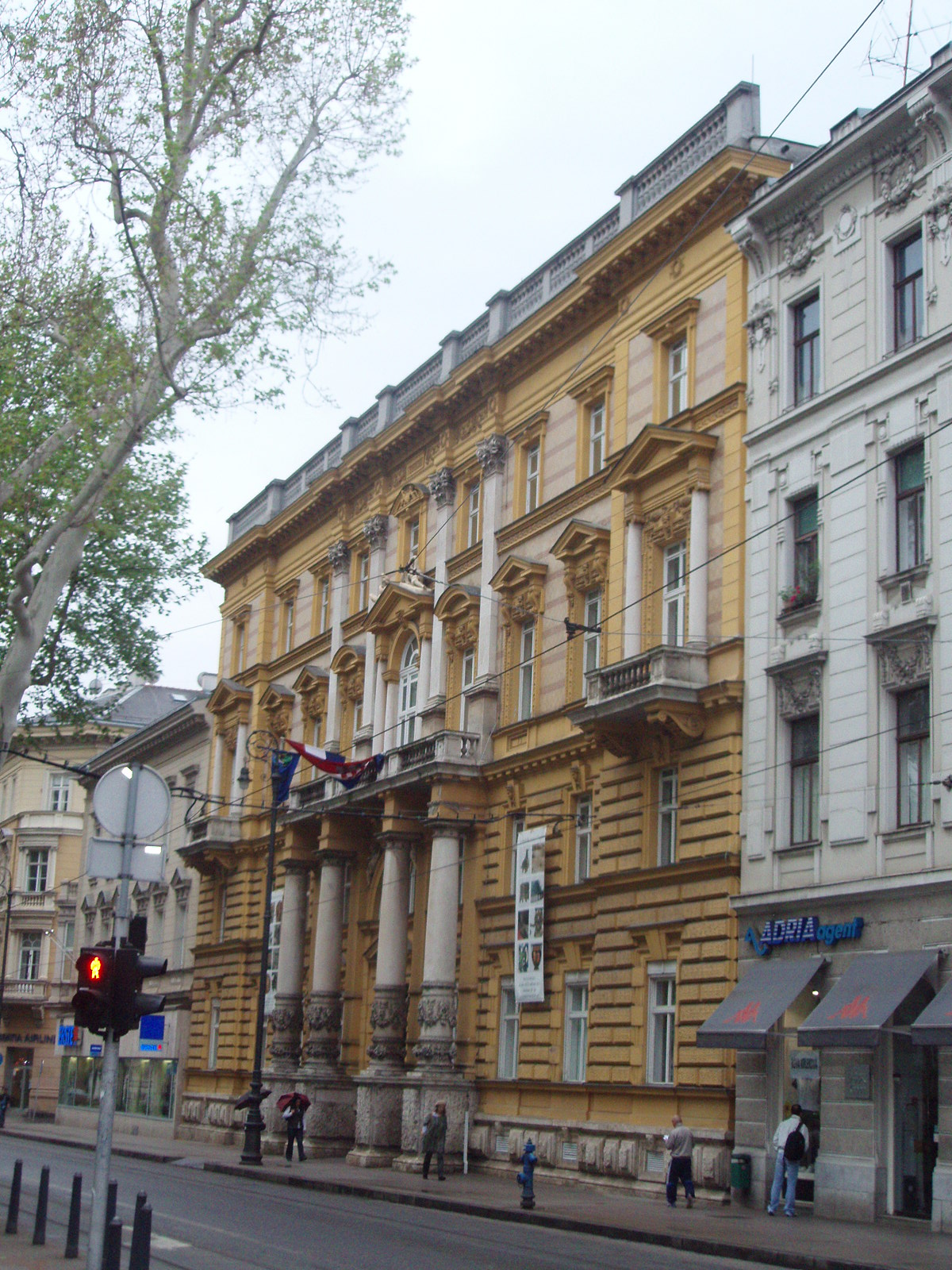
Branch building in Zagreb, repurposed as the Archaeological Museum

== See also ==
- National Bank of Serbia
- Banque de Salonique
- Bank of Romania
- List of banks in France
- List of banks in Yugoslavia
