= Bank of Romania =

Defunct bank in Romania

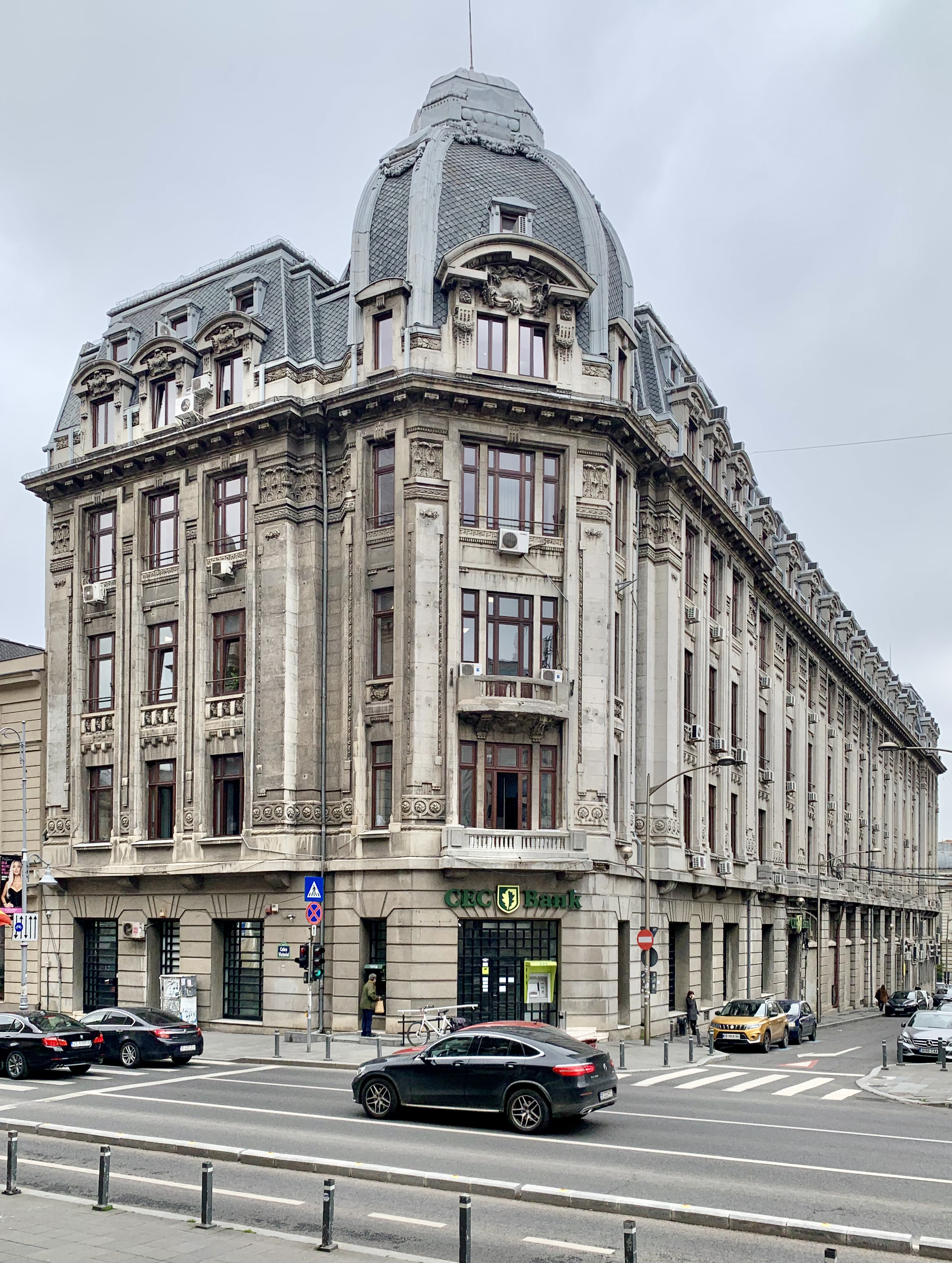
Former Bucharest head office of the Bank of Roumania at 11, Calea Victoriei, now an annex of the palatial headquarters of CEC Bank across the street

The Bank of Romania (Romanian: Banca României, French: Banque de Roumanie), from 1903 Bank of Roumania Ltd., was Romania's oldest bank and its largest financial institution in the late 19th century, created and controlled by the Ottoman Bank until its nationalization in 1948.

== History ==
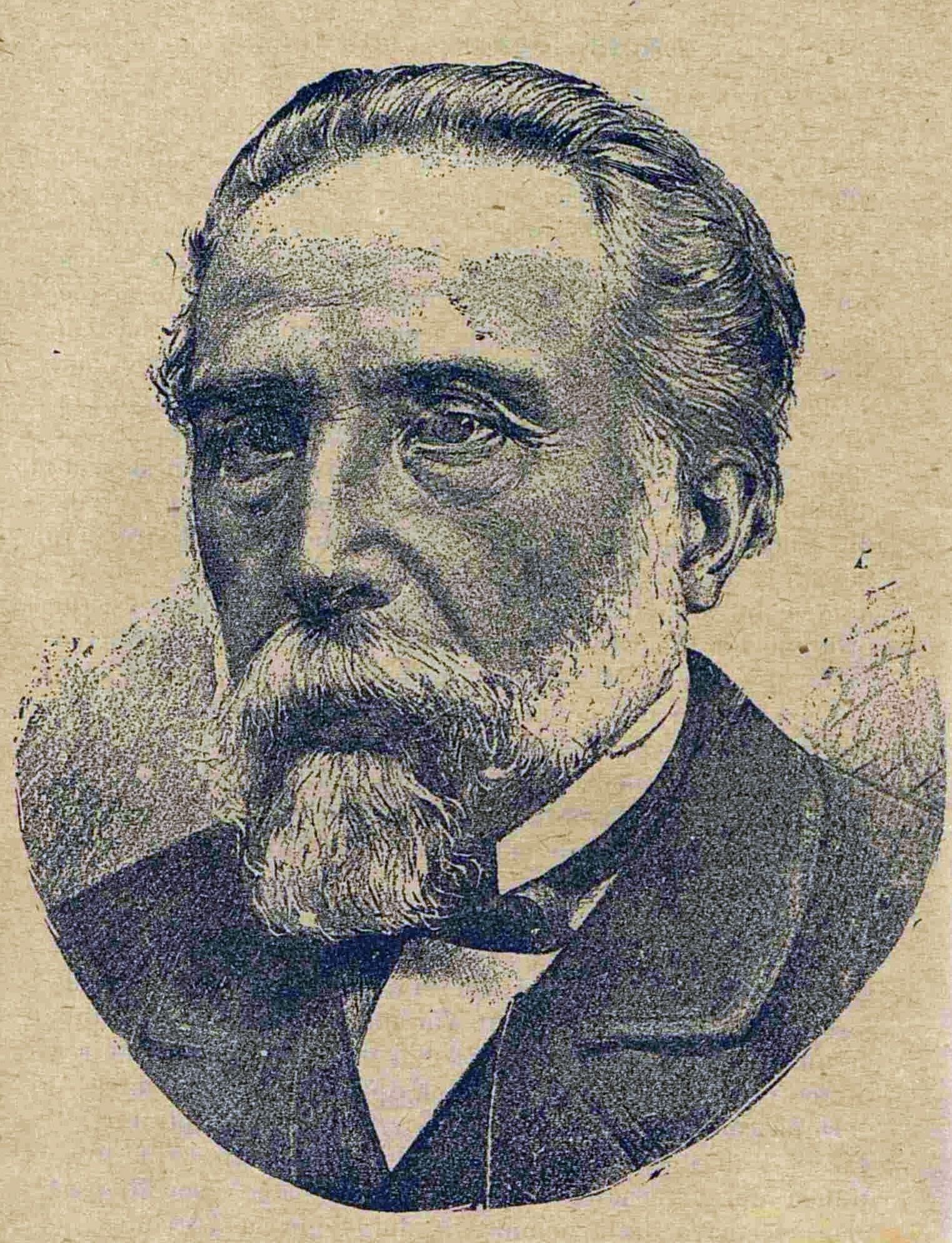
Statesman Ion Ghica was the bank's first chairman in 1866

In 1856, the London-based Ottoman Bank opened a branch in the Danube port city of Galați, and in 1861 opened a second branch in Bucharest. In 1863, the two branches were taken over by the Imperial Ottoman Bank headquartered in Constantinople (known by its French acronym BIO, for Banque Impériale Ottomane), which replaced the Ottoman Bank.

Following the formation of the United Principalities of Moldavia and Wallachia, domnitor Alexandru Ioan Cuza encouraged the formation of domestically headquartered banks. In 1865 he authorized the Bank of Romania, which was formally established in early 1866 and took over the viable business of the BIO's two existing branches, while the BIO retained the branches' troubled assets which it only fully liquidated in 1872. The Anglo-Austrian Bank also participated in the new venture. Its first chairman was statesman Ion Ghica. It was initially granted a privilege to issue banknotes, but that was revoked in 1869 under Cuza's successor Carol of Hohenzollern-Sigmaringen. It also obtained the country's Tobacco concession, and the Romanian royal family maintained an account at the bank for some time.

By the 1890s, the bank had an office in London at 7, Great Winchester Street. In 1903, because of Romanian legislation that did not allow it to further extend its activity as a foreign-controlled domestic bank, it was reorganized so that the London office became a fully-fledged subsidiary of the BIO, the Bank of Roumania Ltd., and the operation in Romania became that British bank's Bucharest branch. (The Galați branch appears to have been closed by then.) As such, it was no longer privileged, but was one of four foreign banks active in Bucharest before World War I (the others being Banca Generala Româna, est. 1895; Banca de Credit Român, est. 1904; and Banca Comercială Română, est. 1906), whose aggregate assets represented half of those of the nine largest domestic banks by 1911. Nevertheless, the bank was conservatively managed by the BIO, and gradually lost market share.

Like other Romanian banks, it suspended most of its activity during World War I between 1916 and 1919. By the early 1930s, the London head office had moved to 73-76, King William Street. The bank was nationalized in 1948, together with the rest of the Romanian banking sector. The London entity was liquidated in 1951.

== See also ==
- Ottoman Bank
- National Bank of Romania
- Banque Franco-Serbe
- List of banks in Romania
