= Military ranks of Syria =

The Military ranks of Syria are the military insignia used by the Syrian Armed Forces. The Syrian military ranks used a rank structure similar to that of the British Armed Forces and the French Armed Forces.

== Current ranks ==
There have been indications of a possible change in the design of Syrian military rank insignias as of 2025. Photographs of Syrian officers, including those of Brigadier general and Colonel ranks attending the International Defence Industry Fair in Turkey appear to show updated insignias on their combat uniforms.

Other recent appearances of senior Syrian officers also show similar insignia, such as during Major General Murhaf Abu Qasra inspection of wounded soldiers in Suwayda whilst wearing a service uniform, his visit to Russia to meet Russian Minister of Defence Andrey Belousov whilst wearing a full dress uniform, and when several officers in combat uniform welcomed returning wounded Hajj pilgrims from the Minister of Defence.

The modifications seem to involve a replacement of the state emblem on the insignia, while retaining the overall rank structure from the Ba'athist era. However, there has been no official announcement from the Syrian Minister of Defence or any other reliable source to confirm these changes.

=== Commissioned officer ranks ===
The rank insignia of commissioned officers.

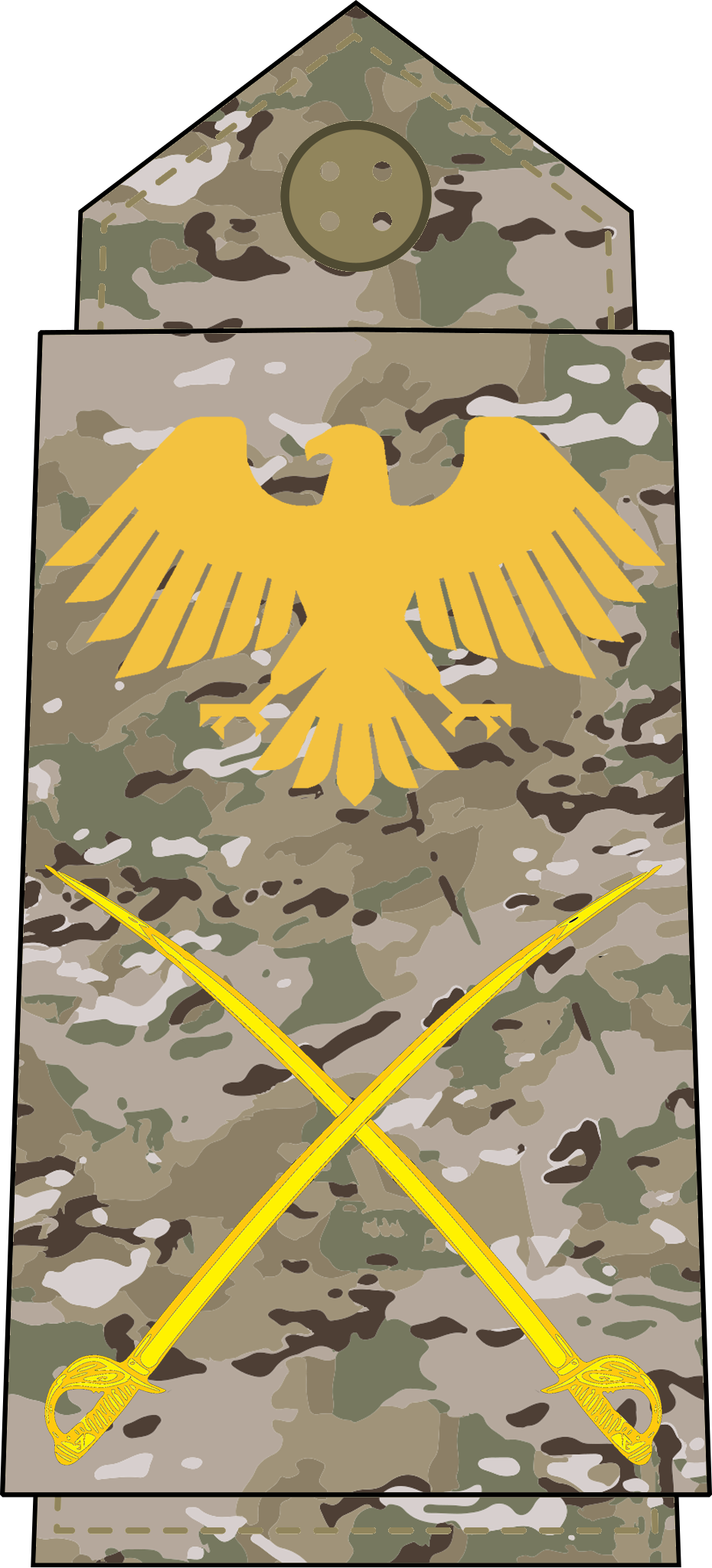
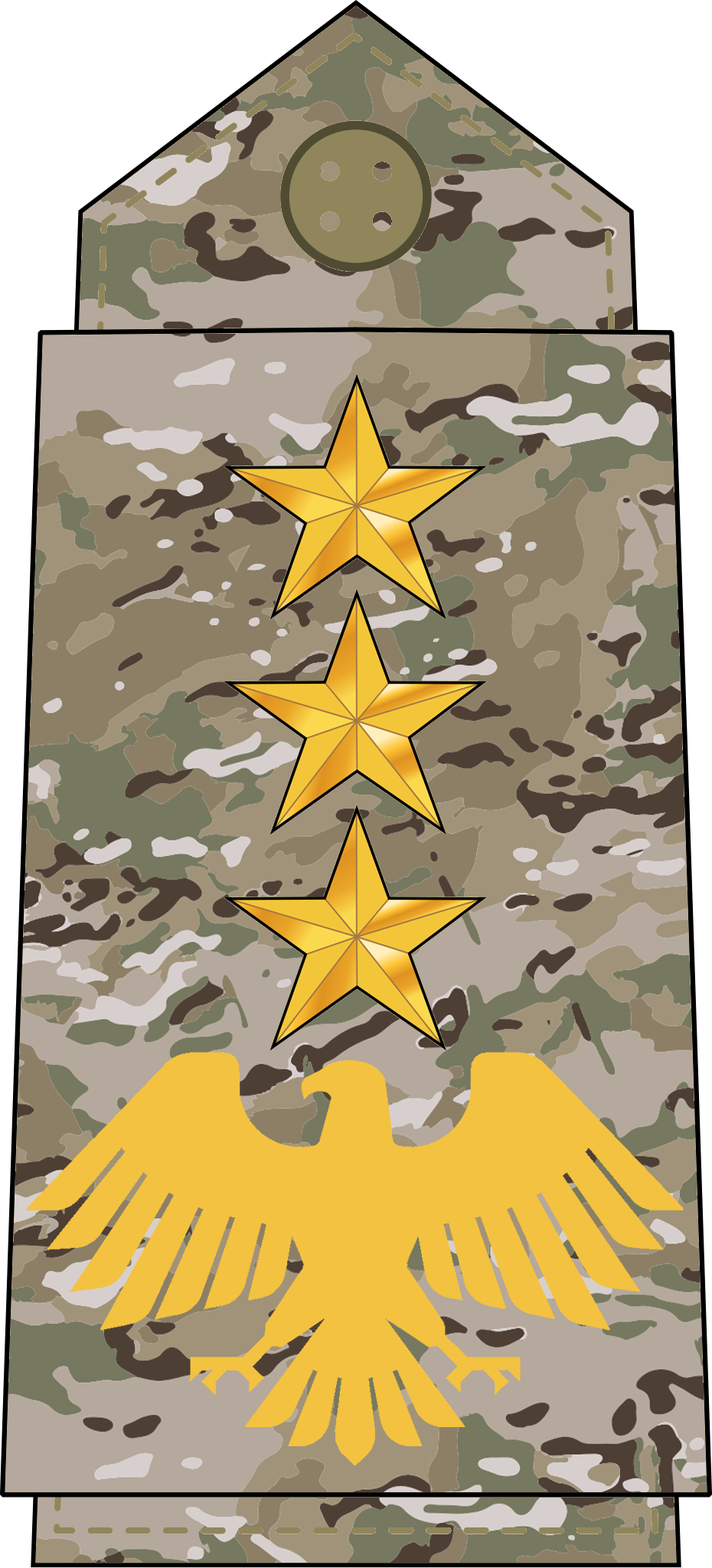
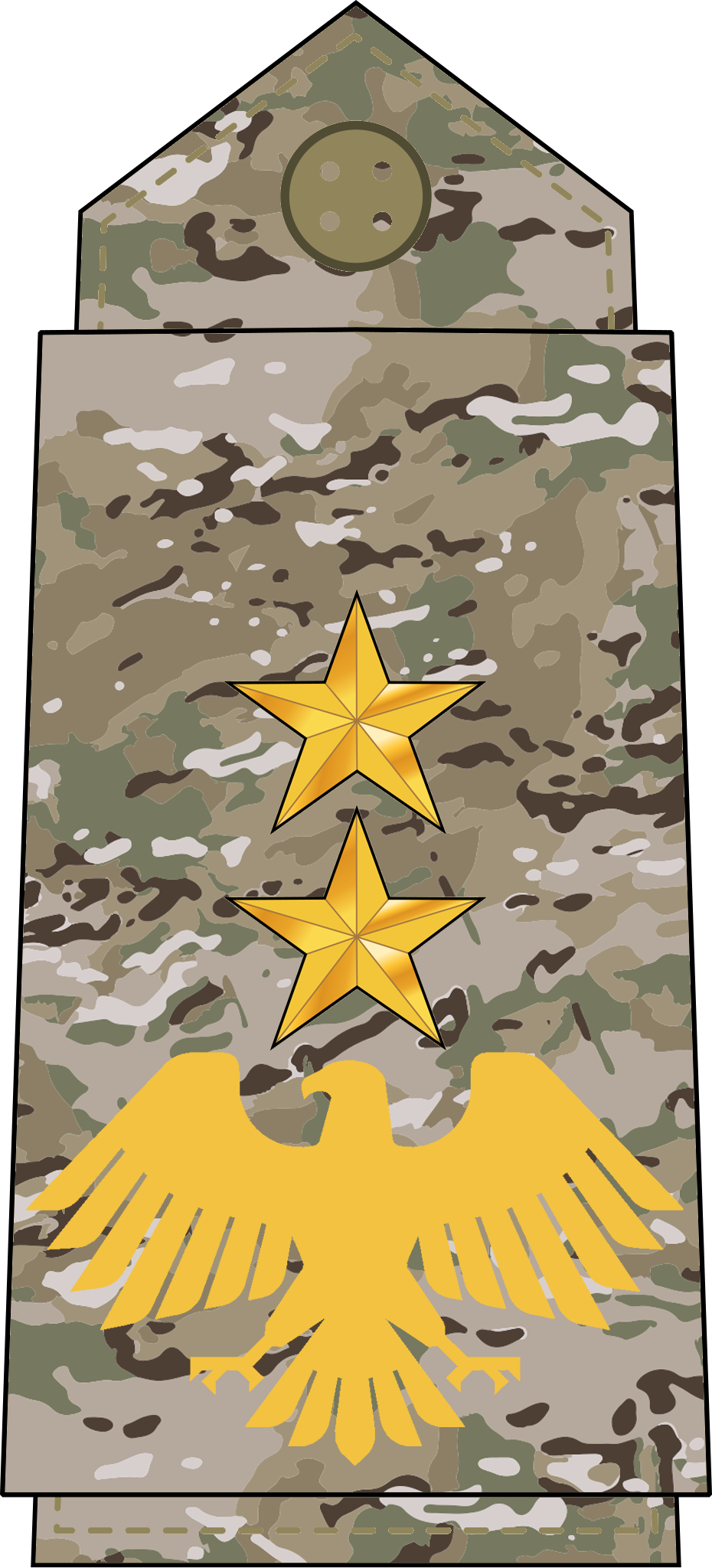
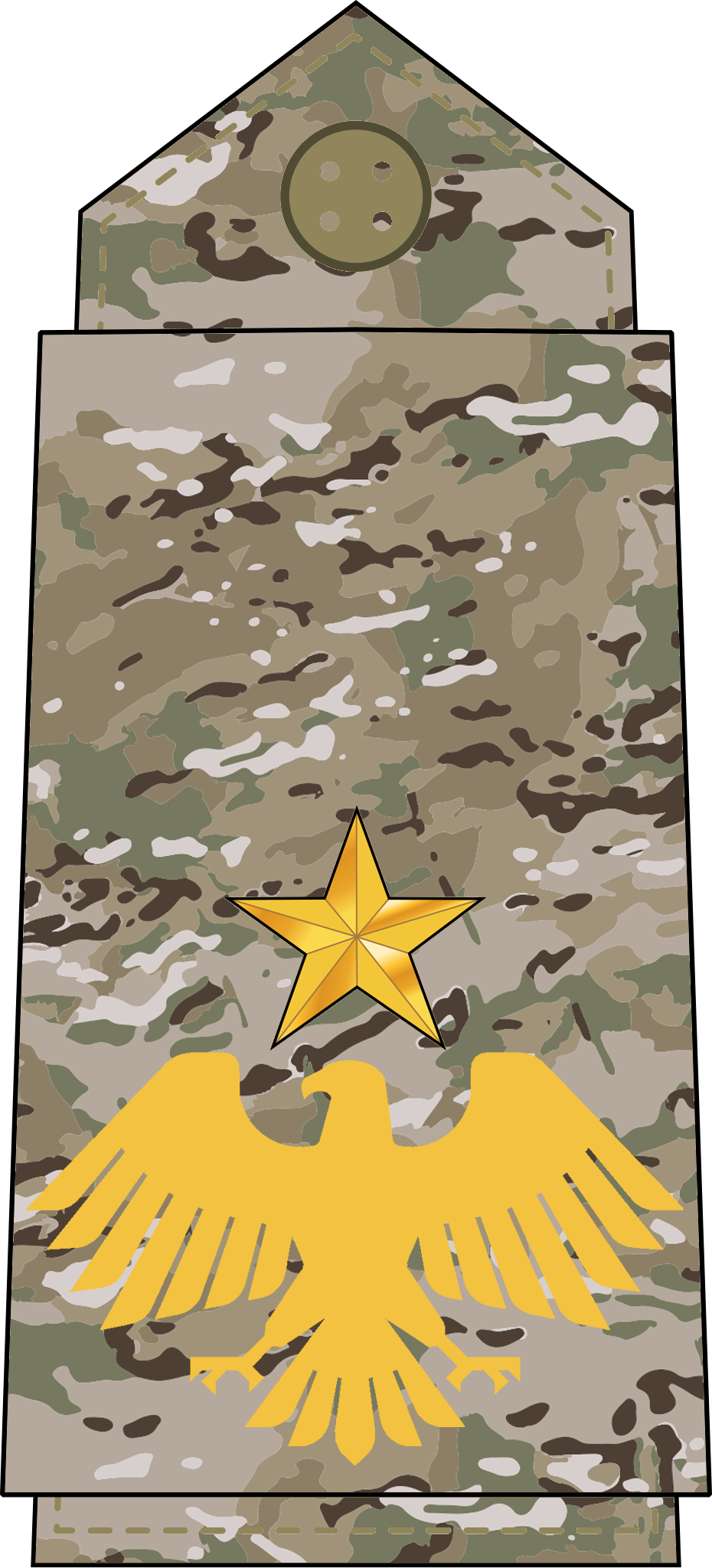
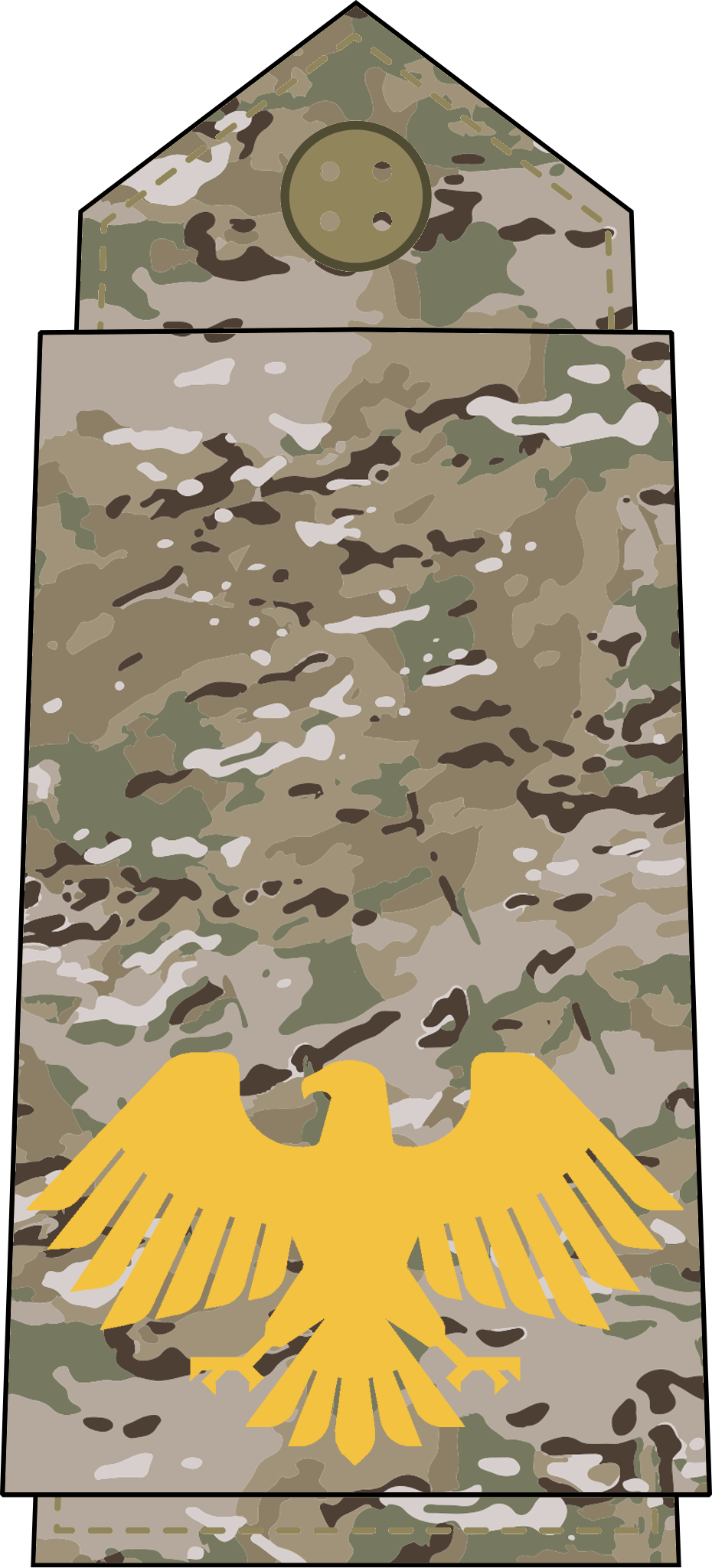
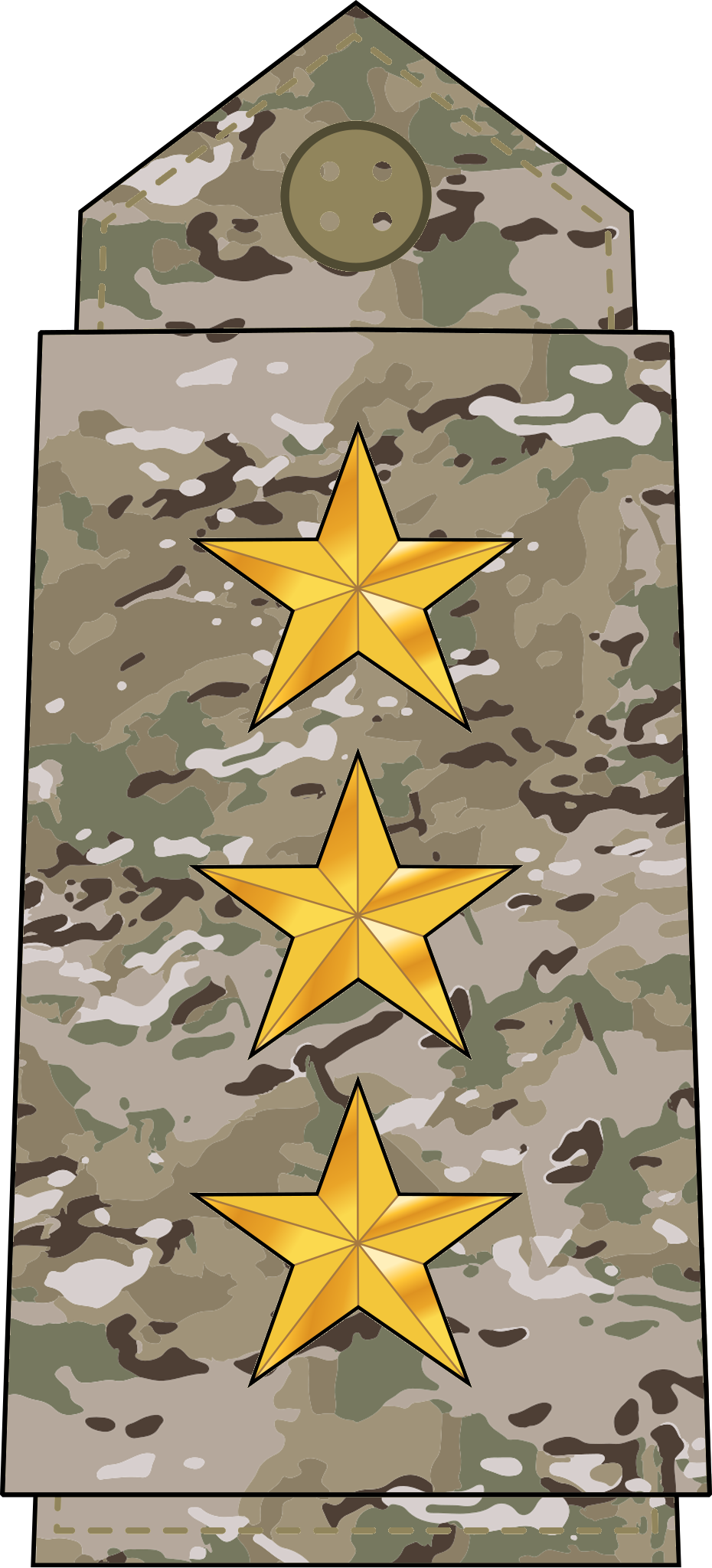
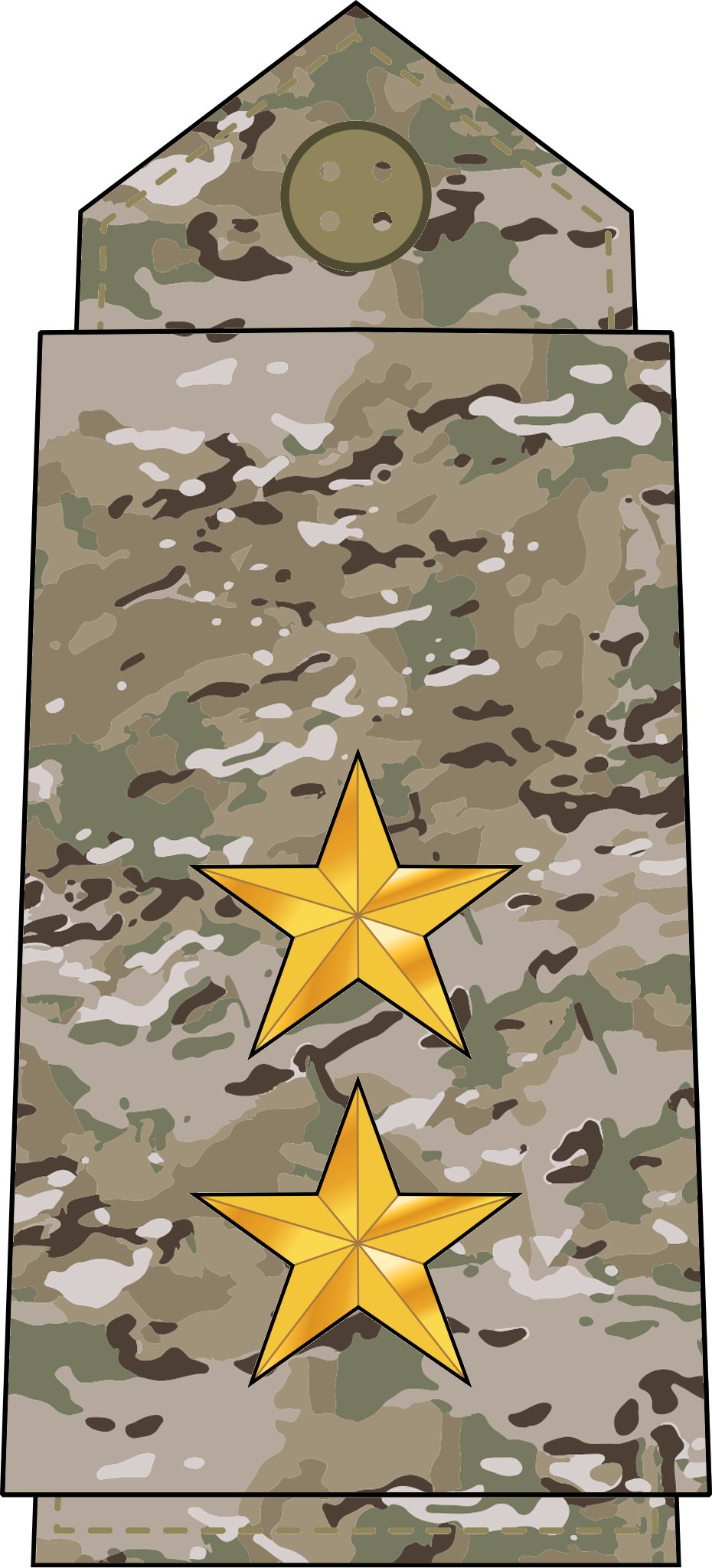
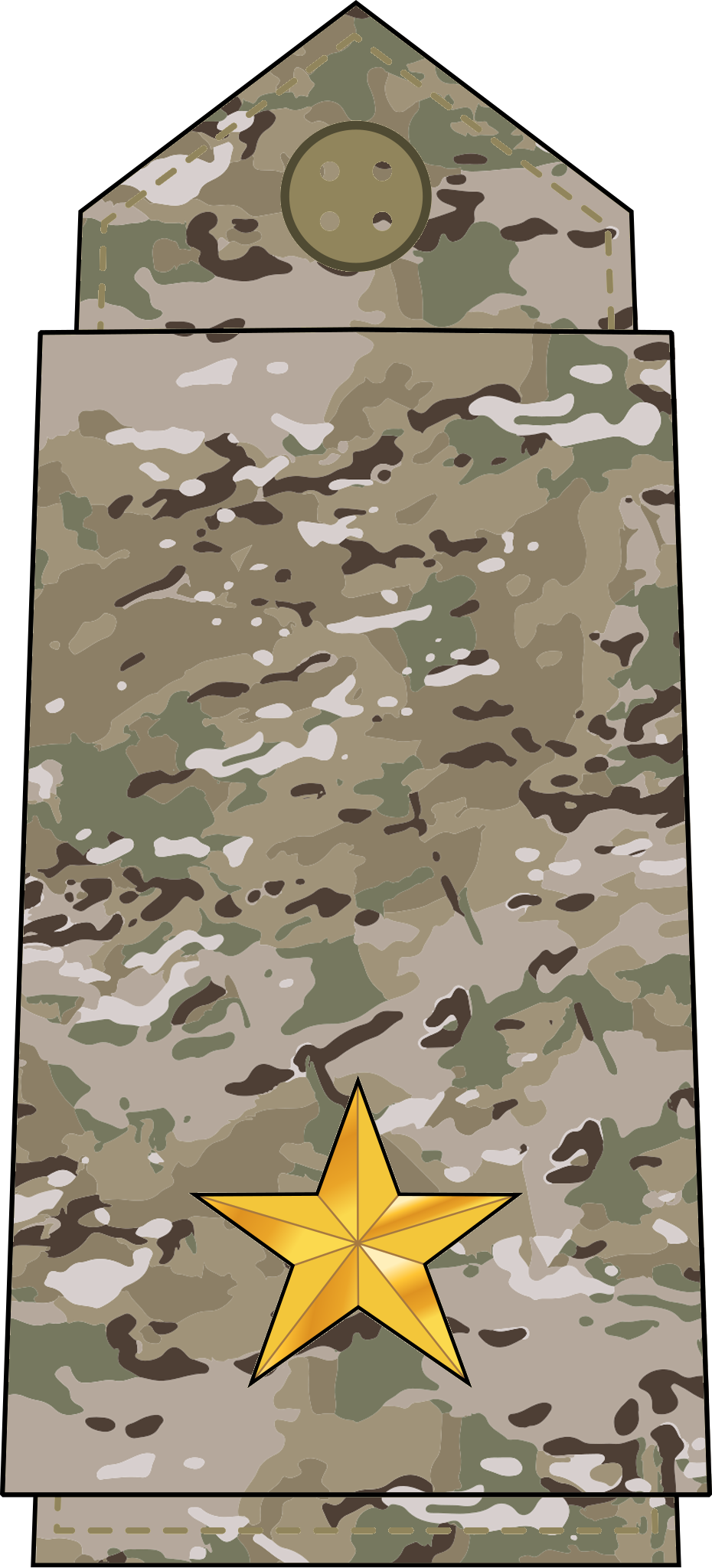
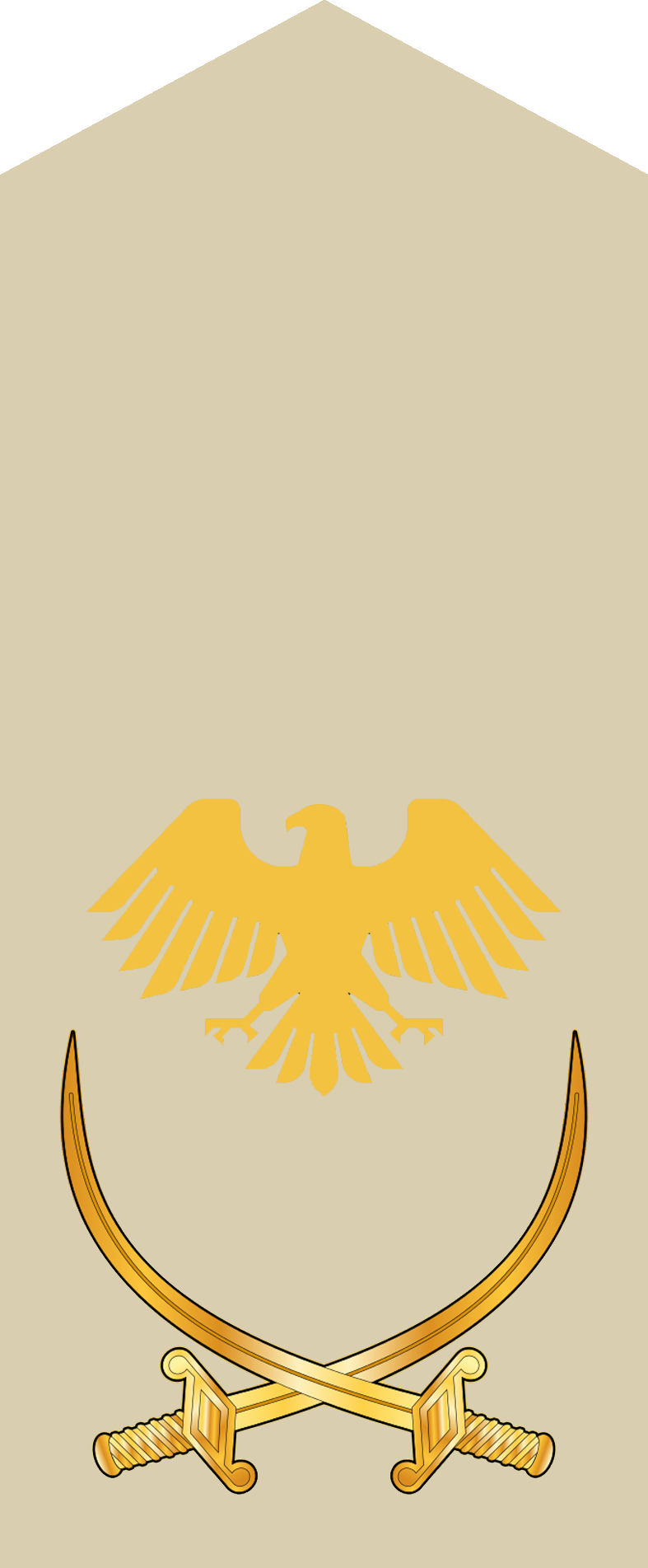
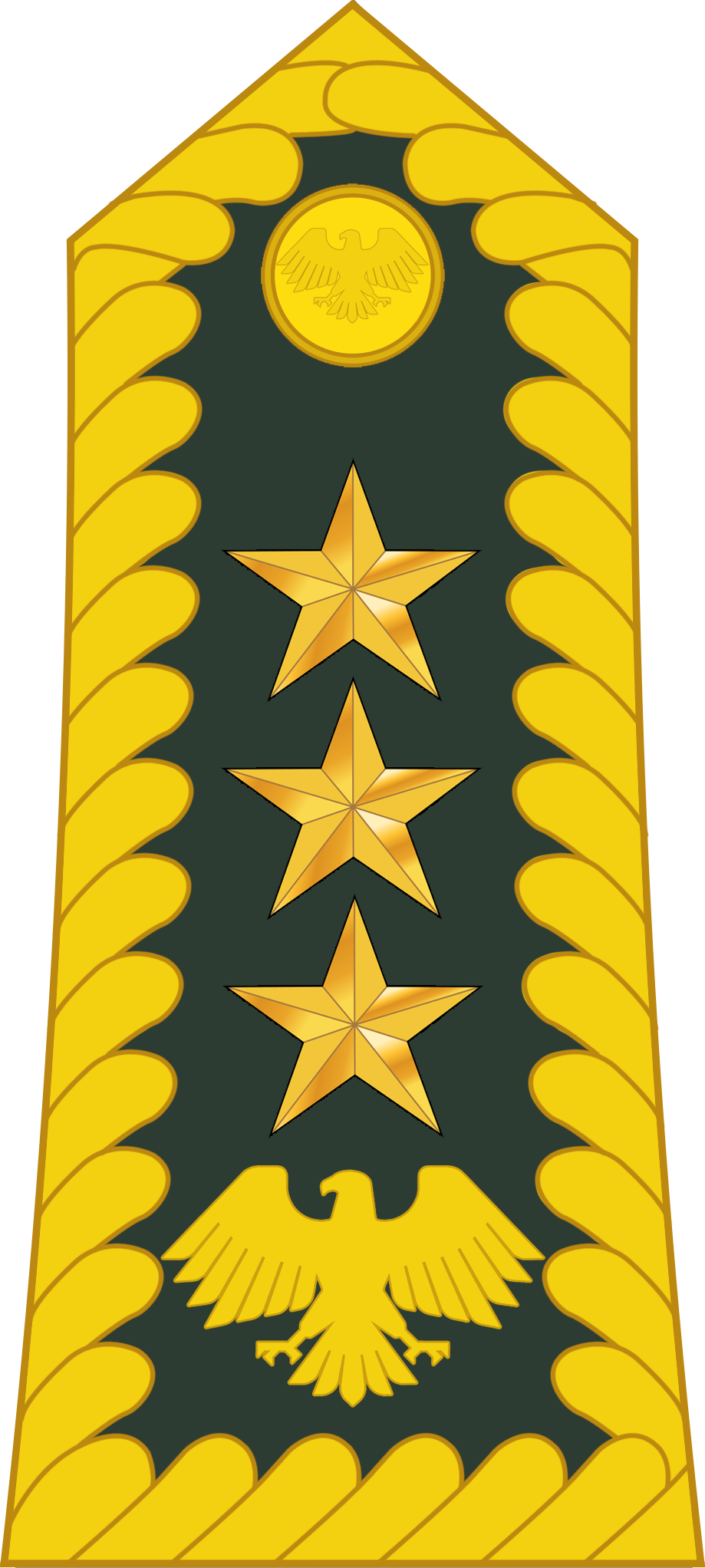
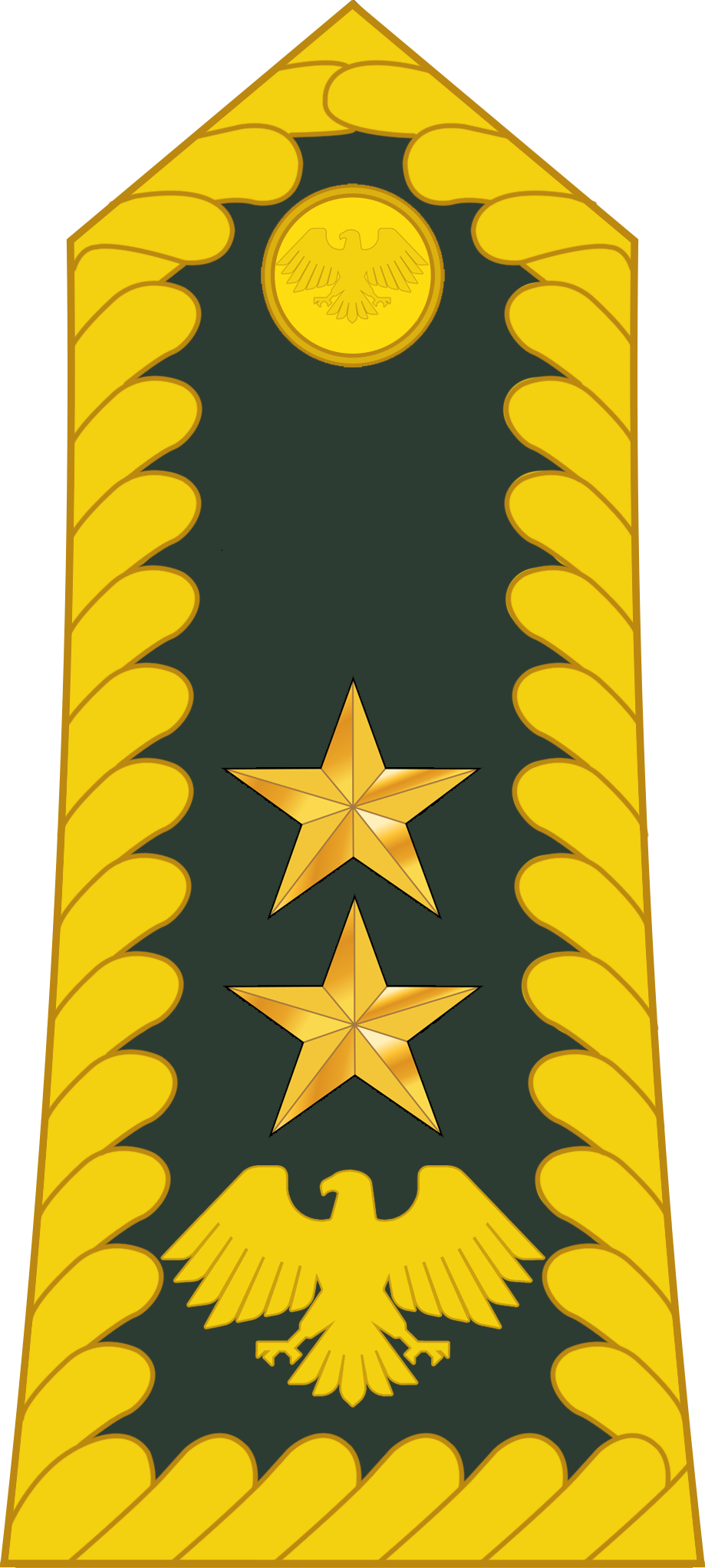
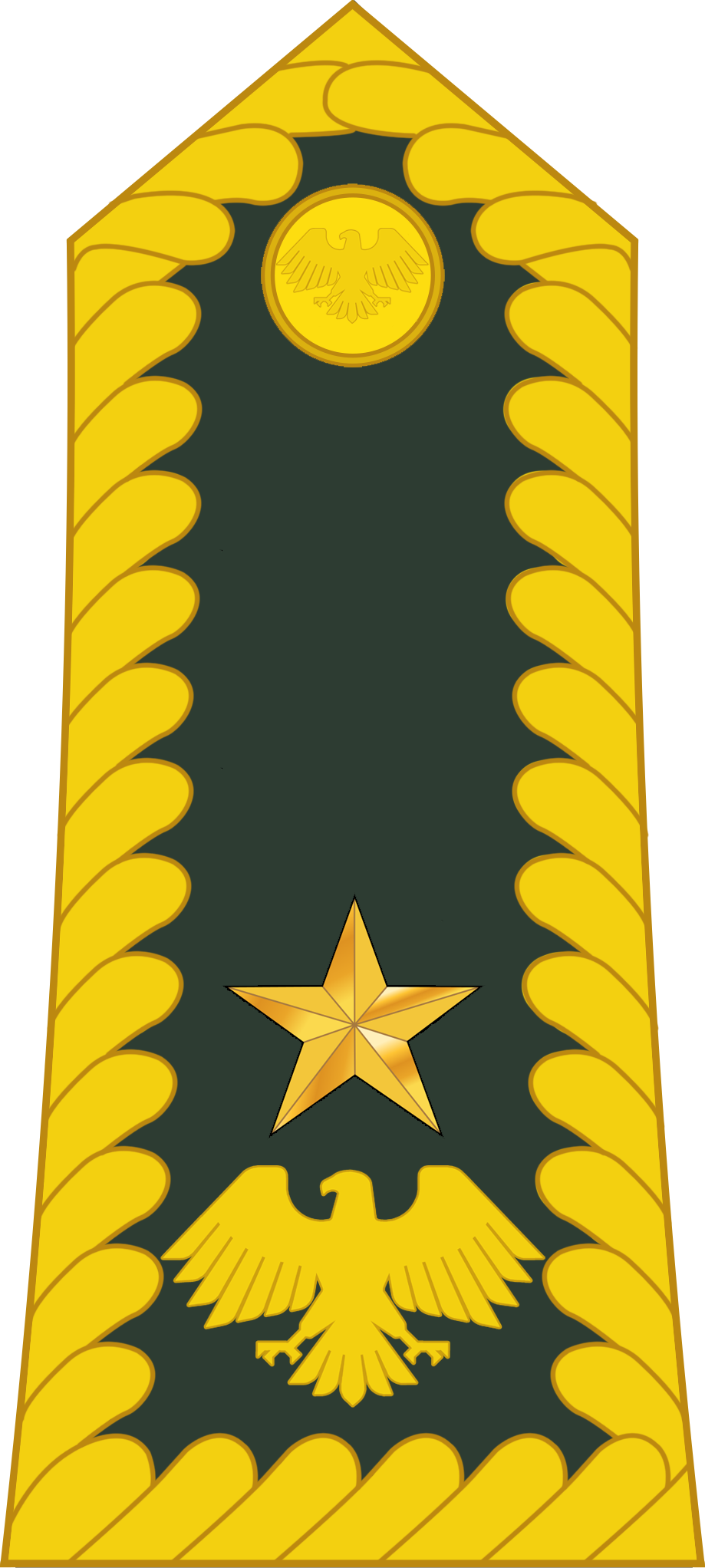
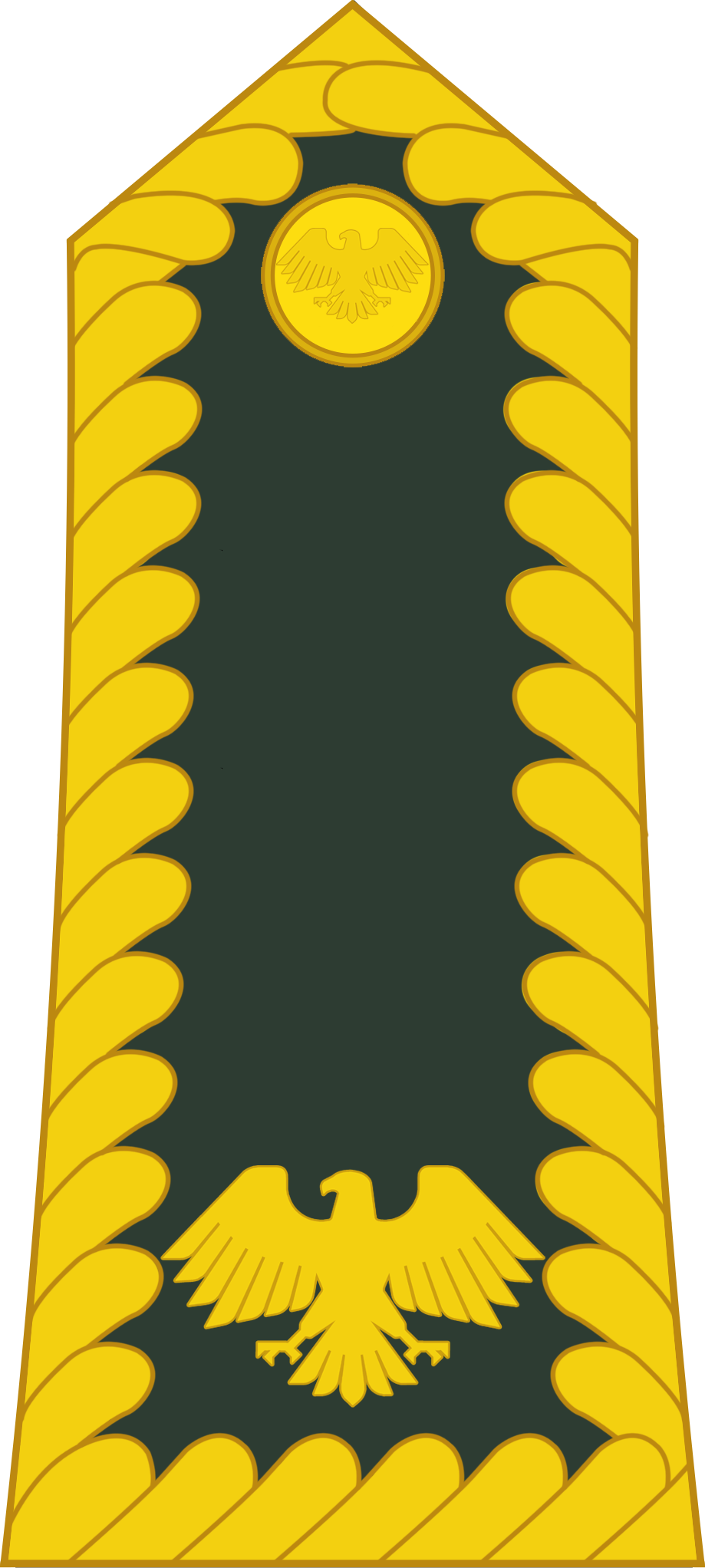
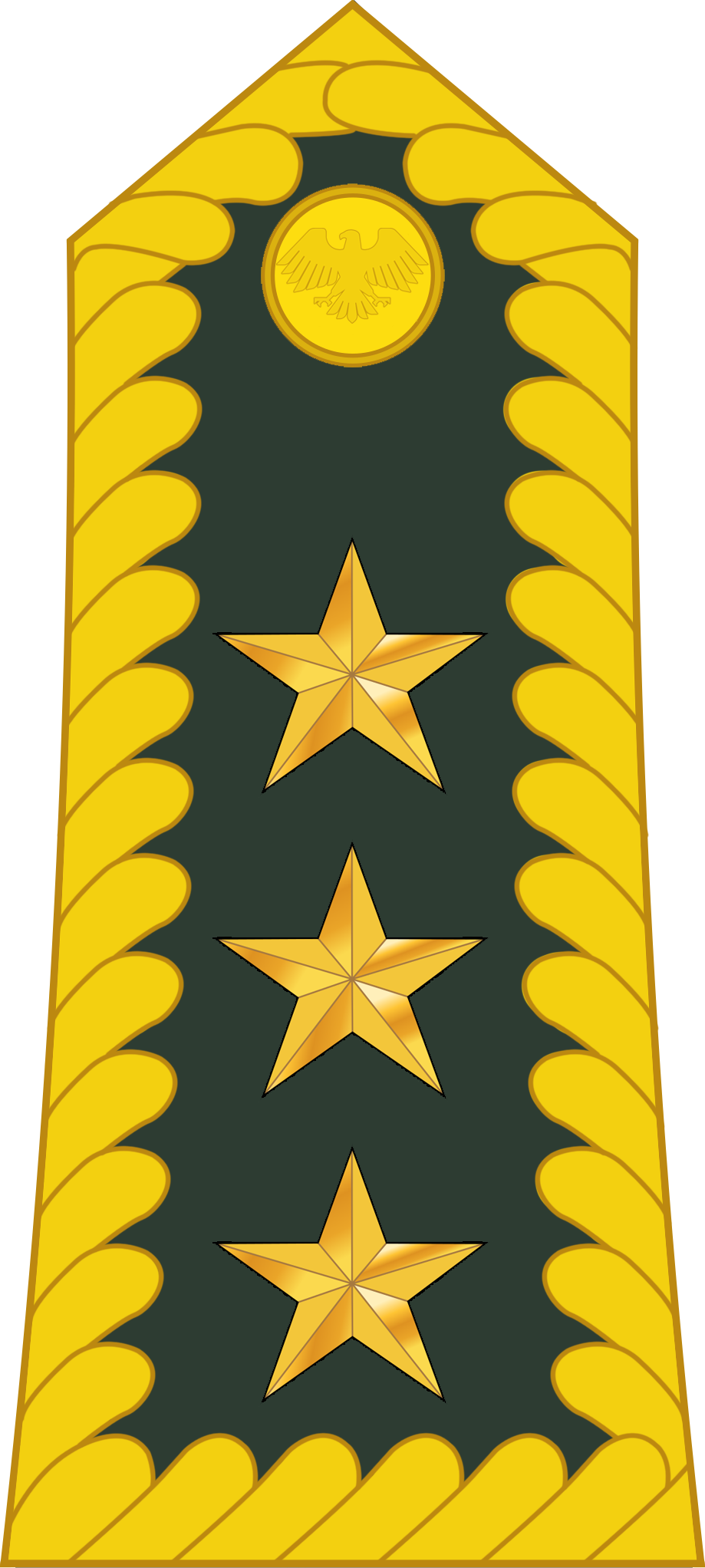
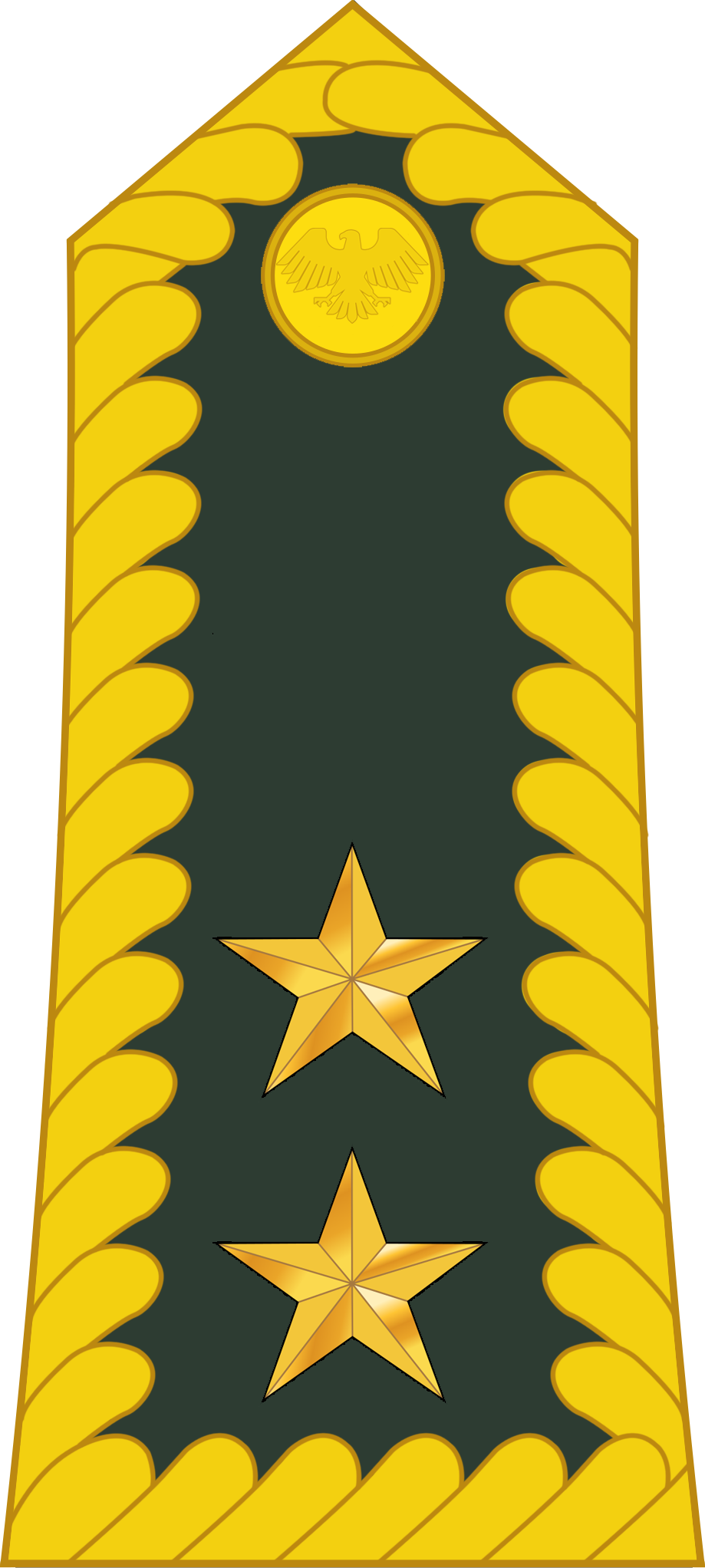
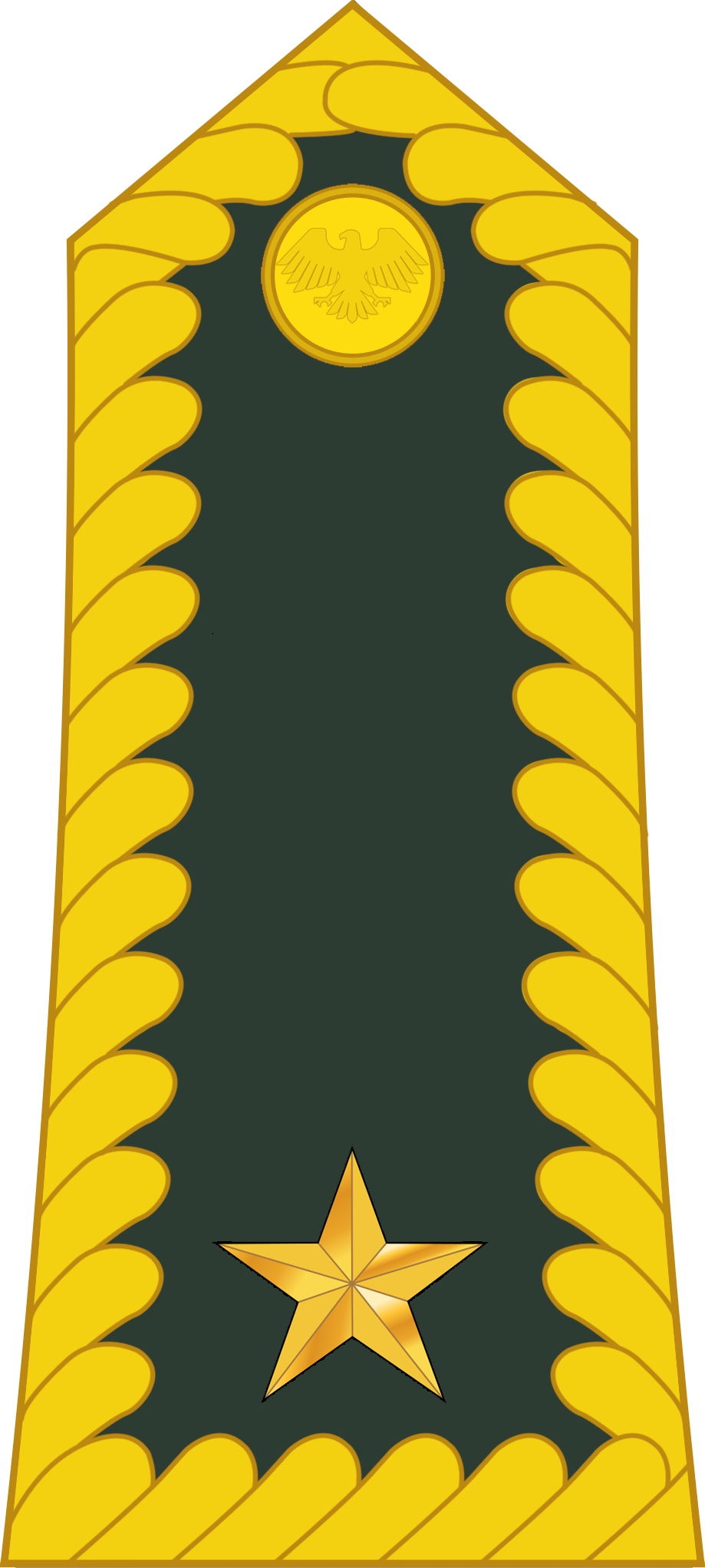
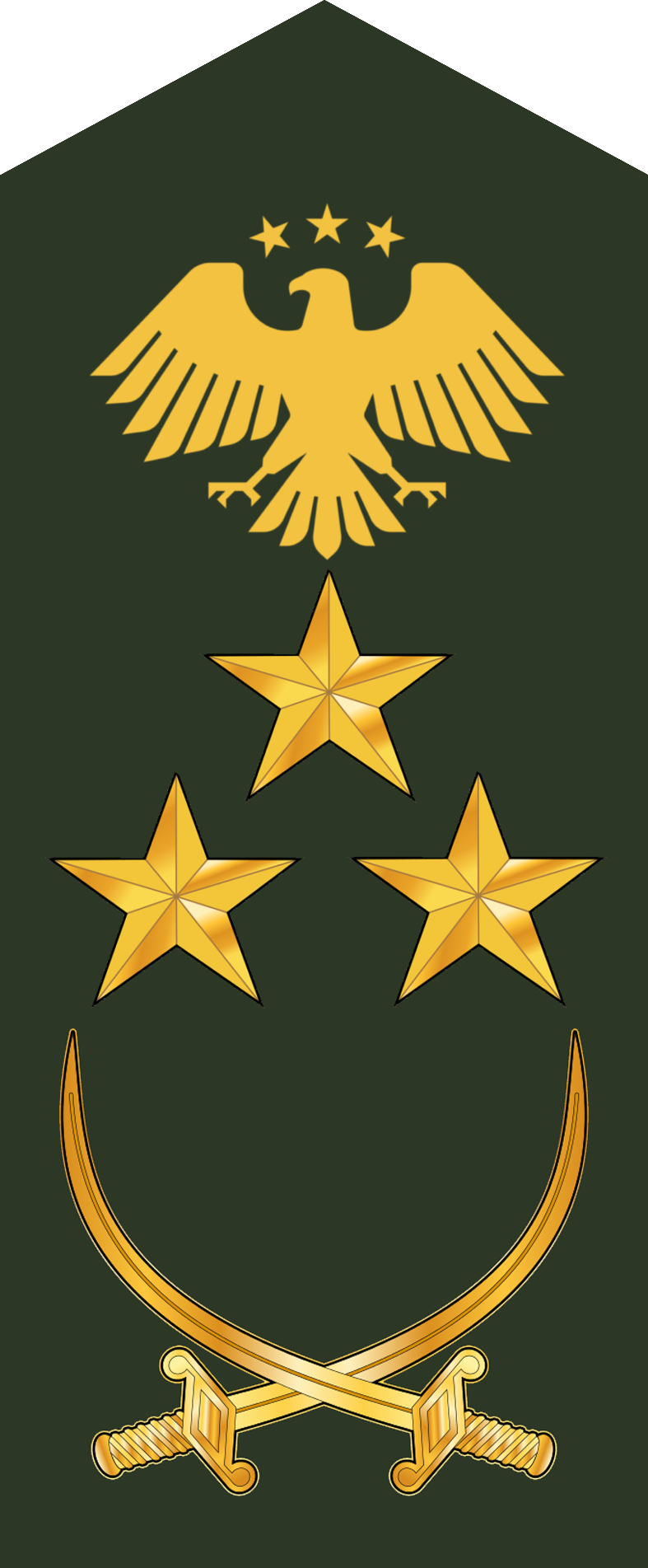
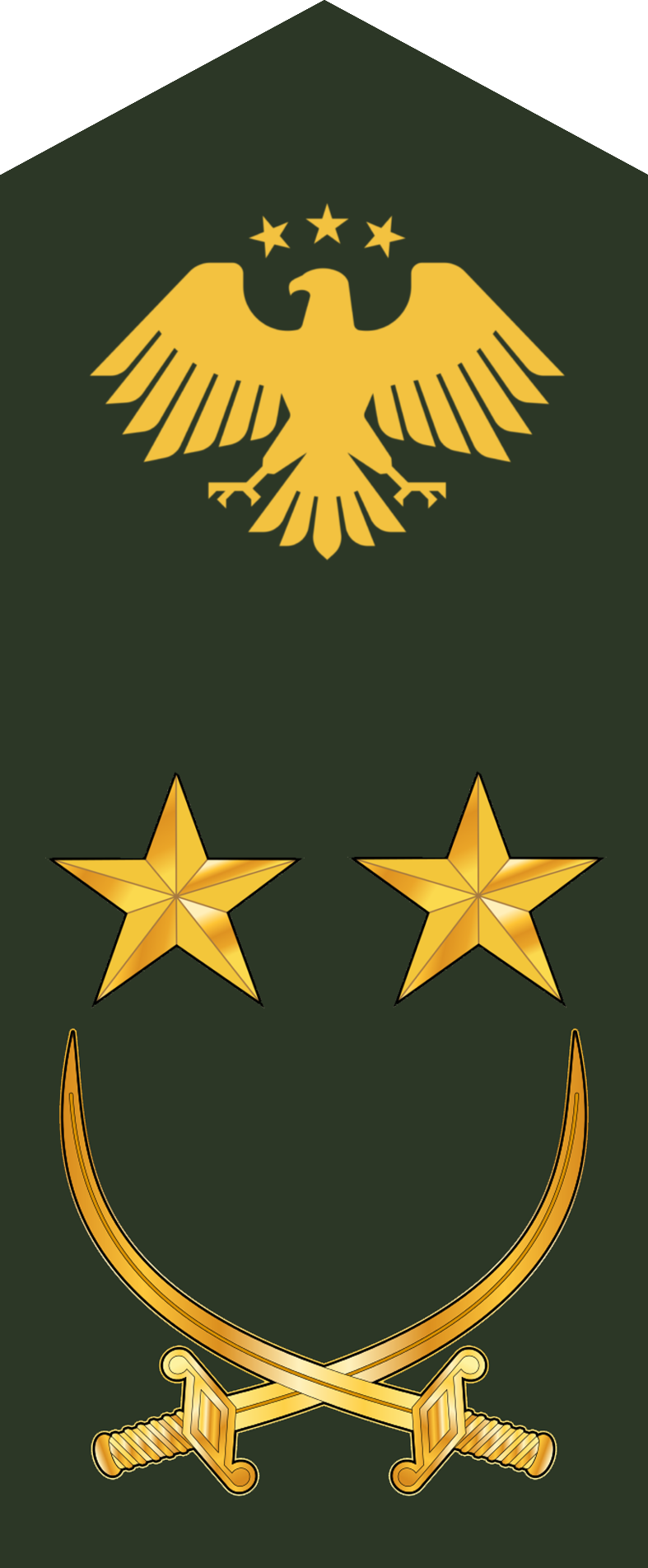
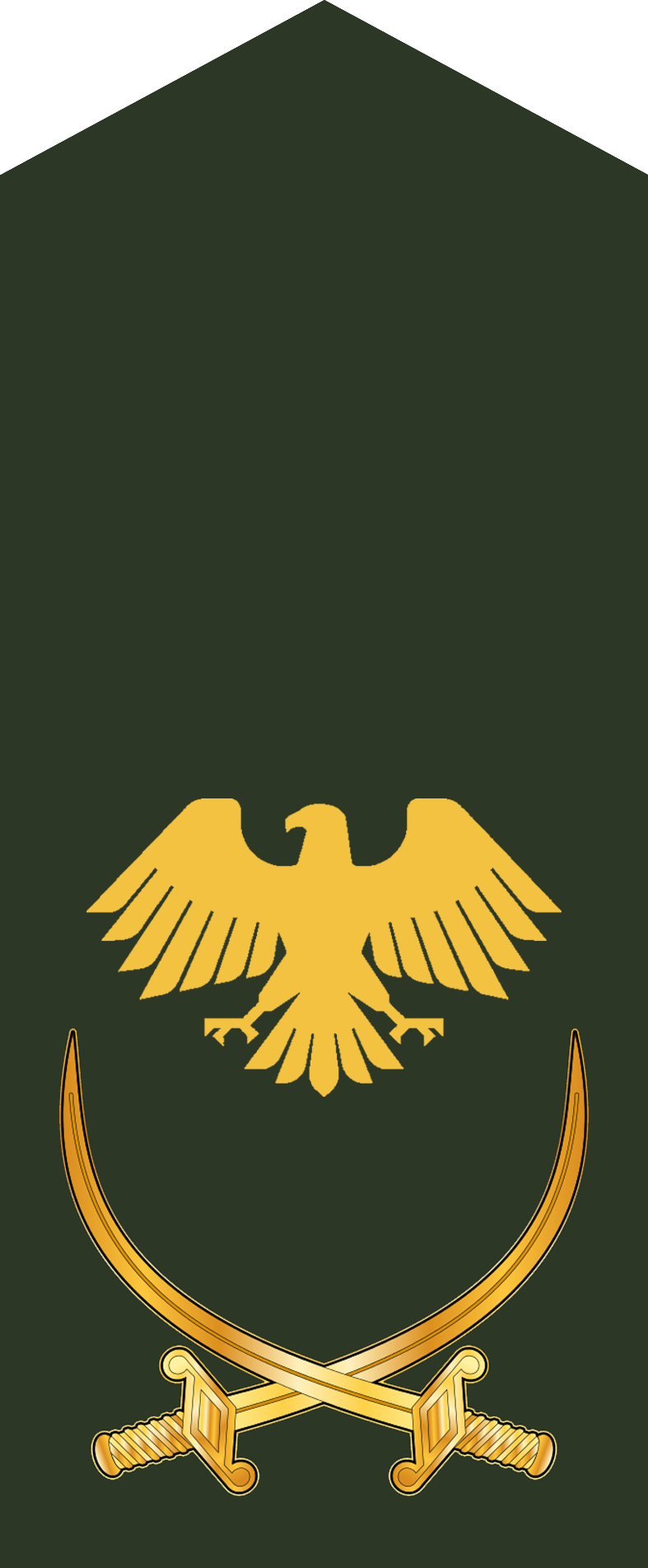
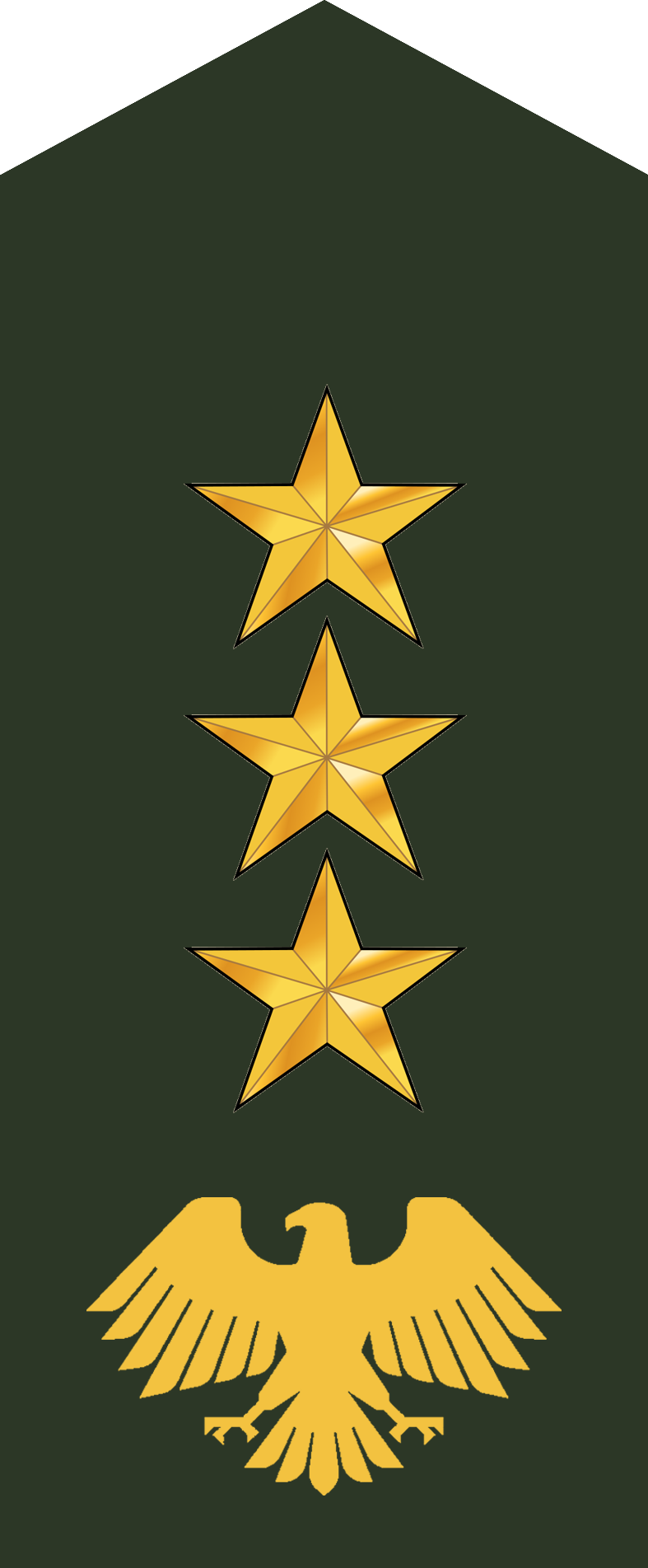
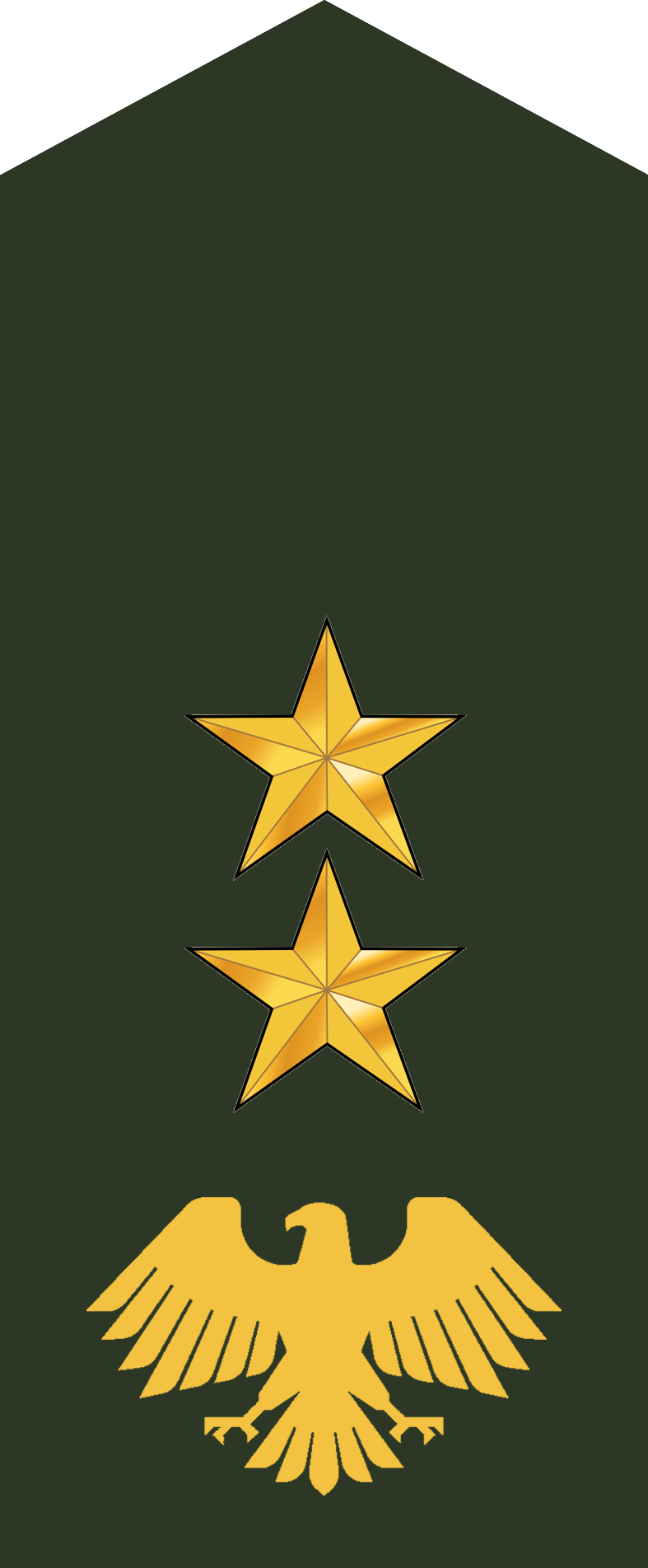
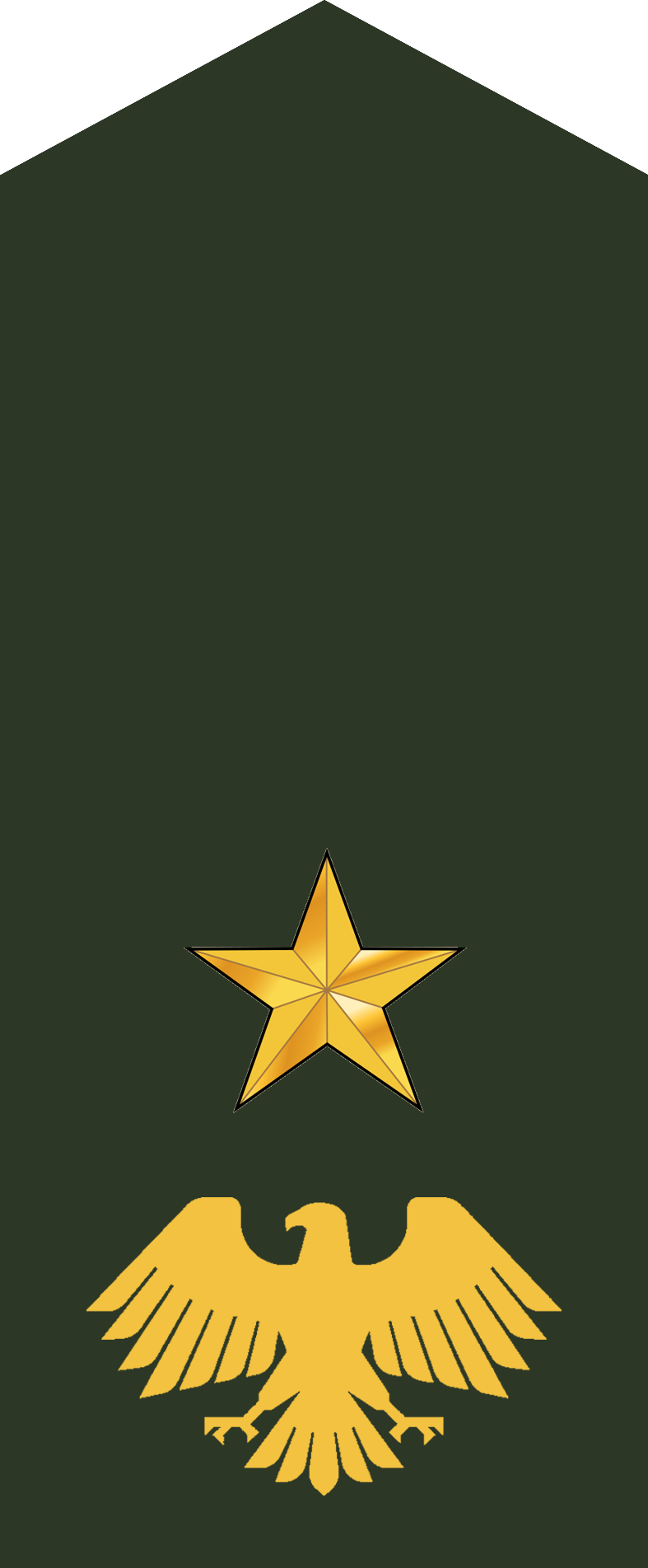
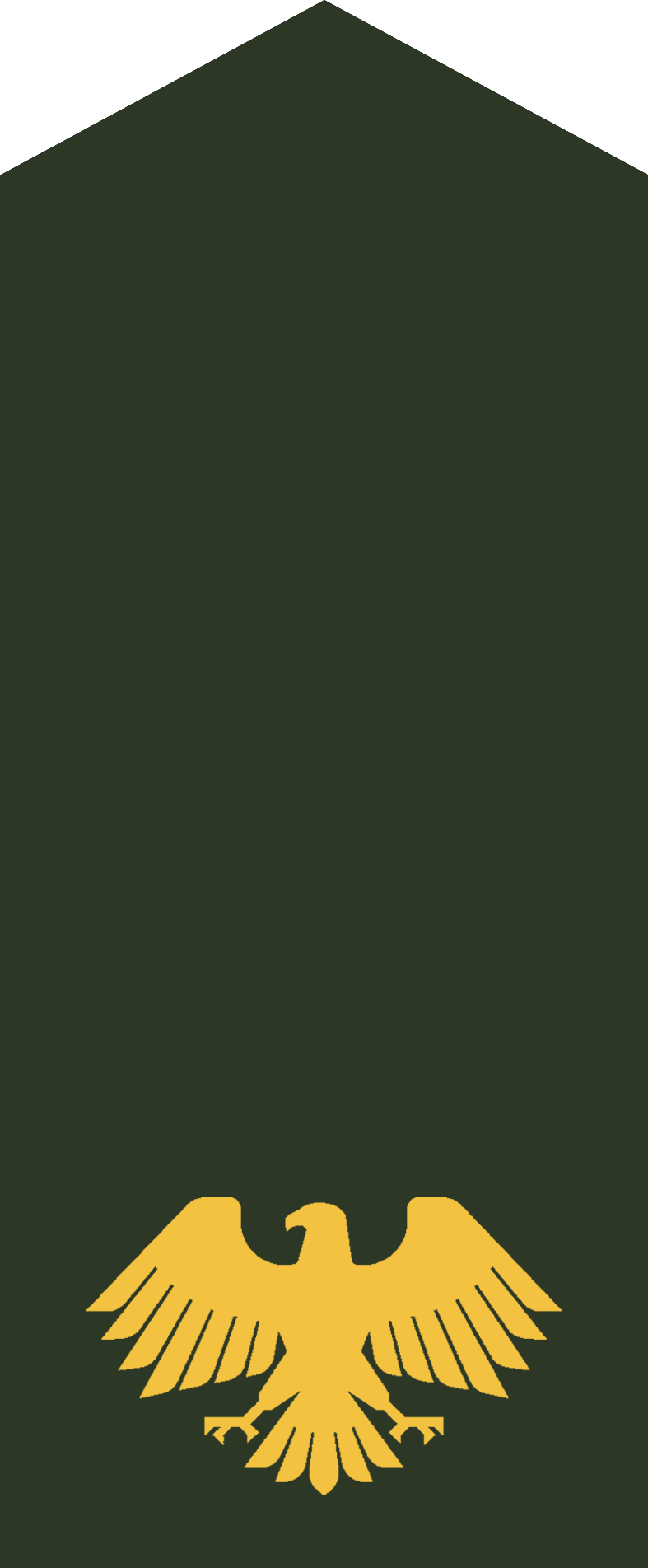
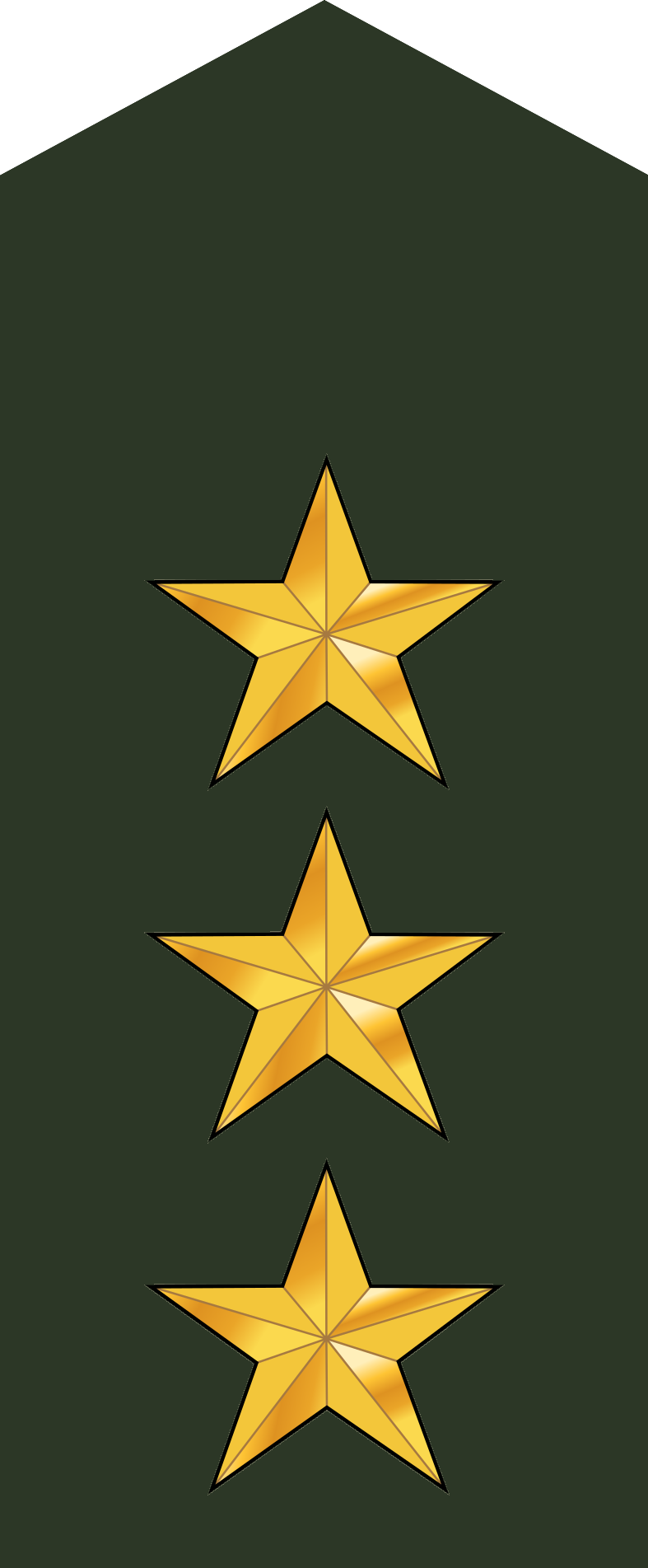
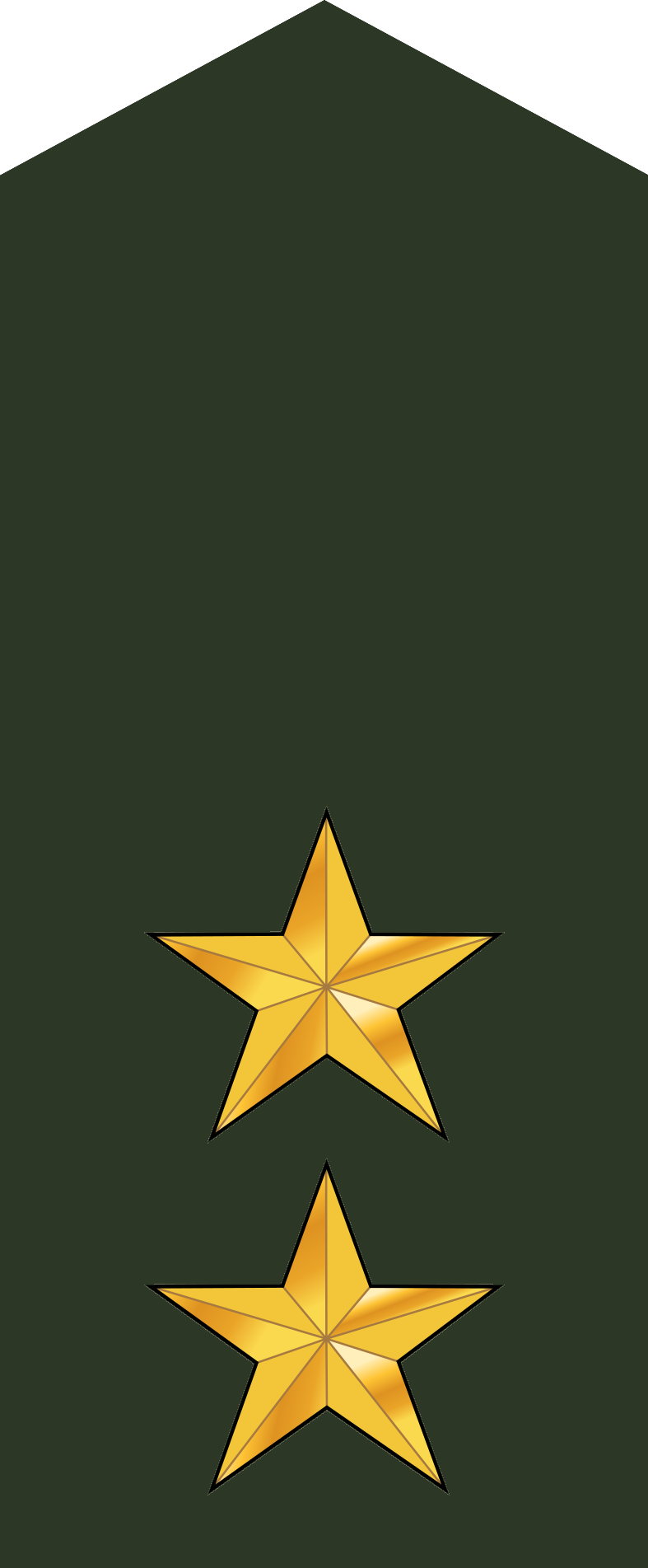
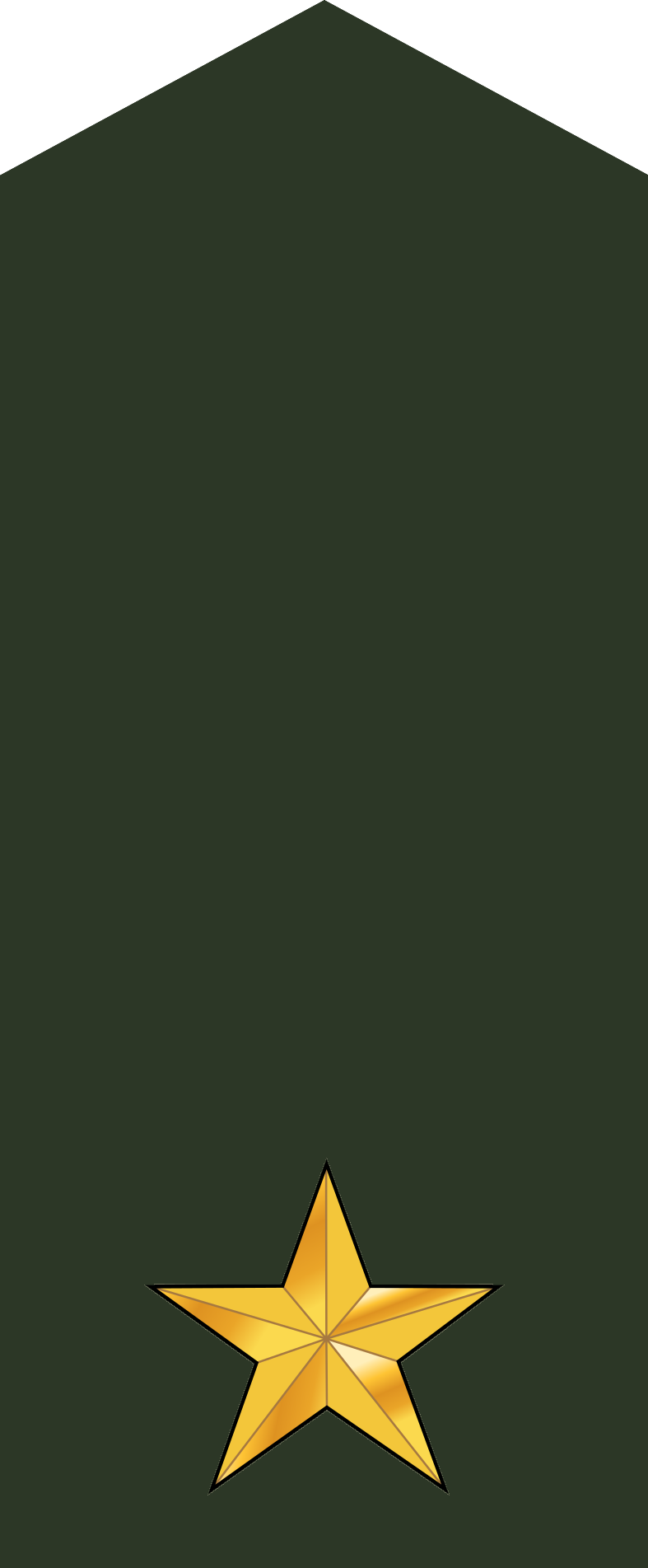
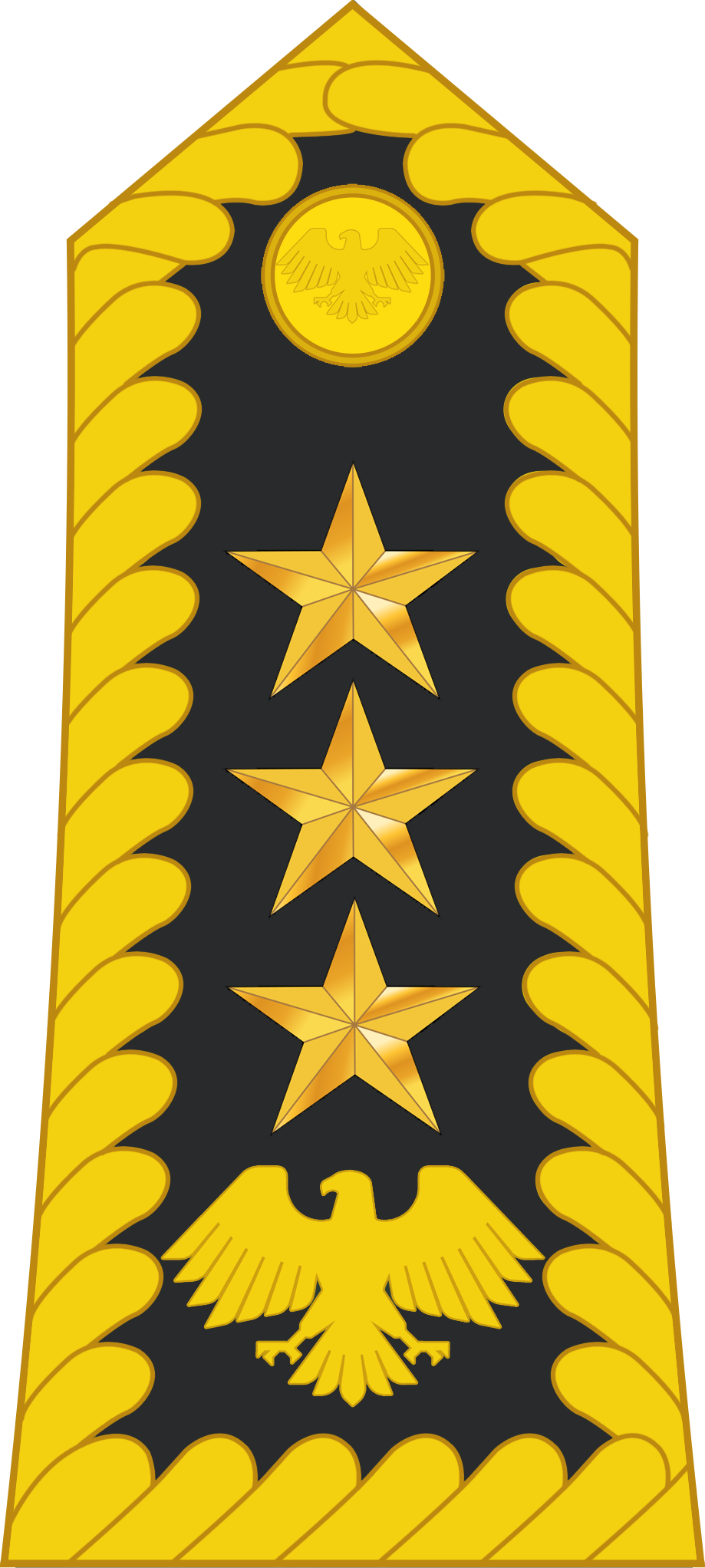
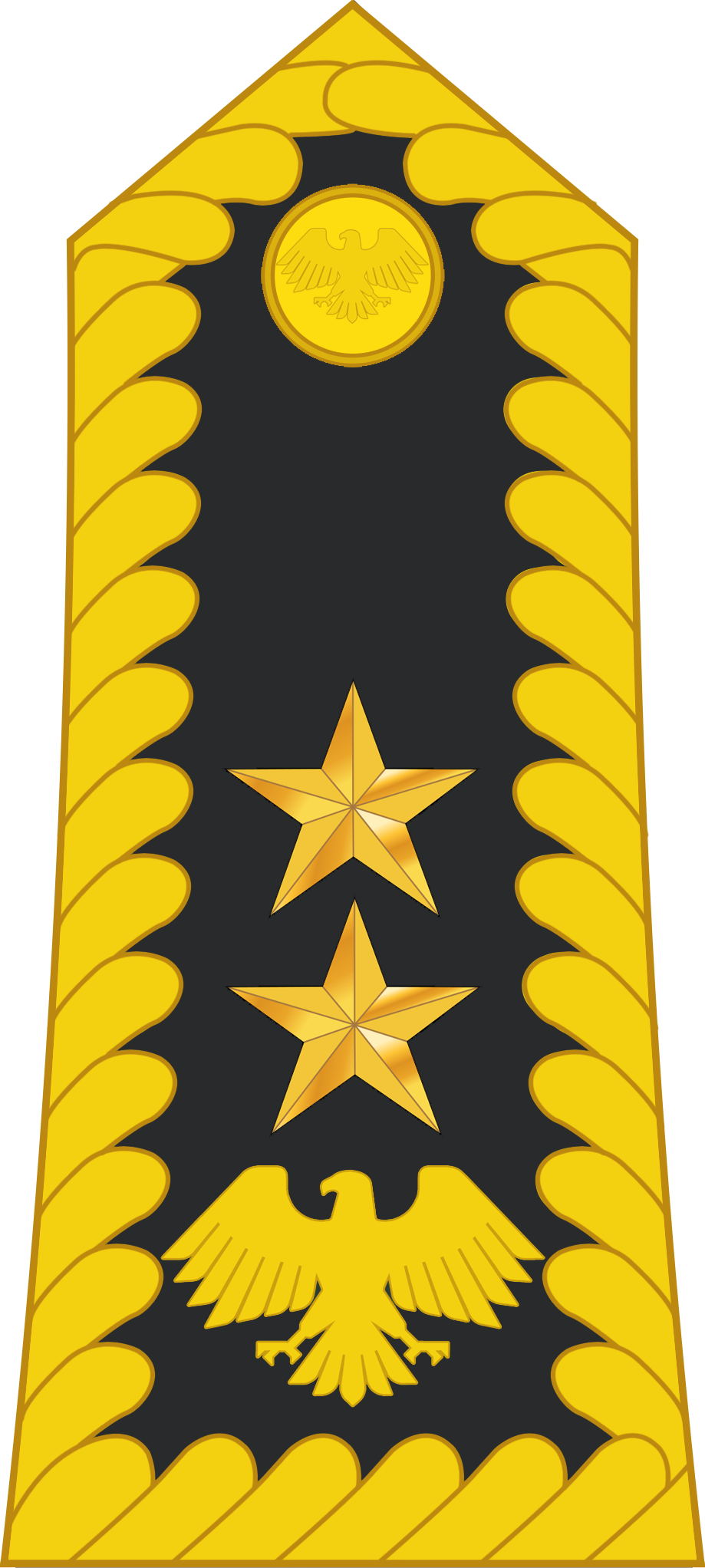
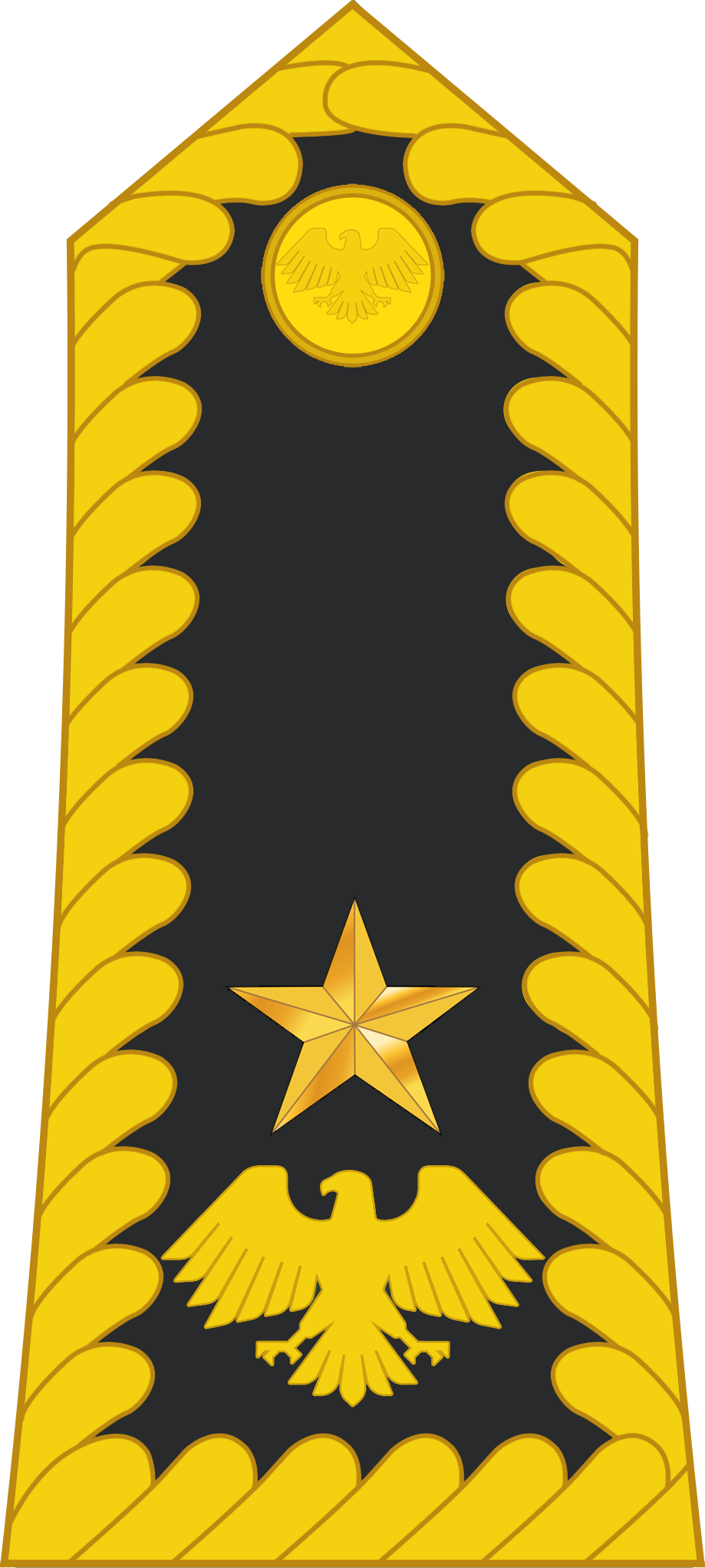
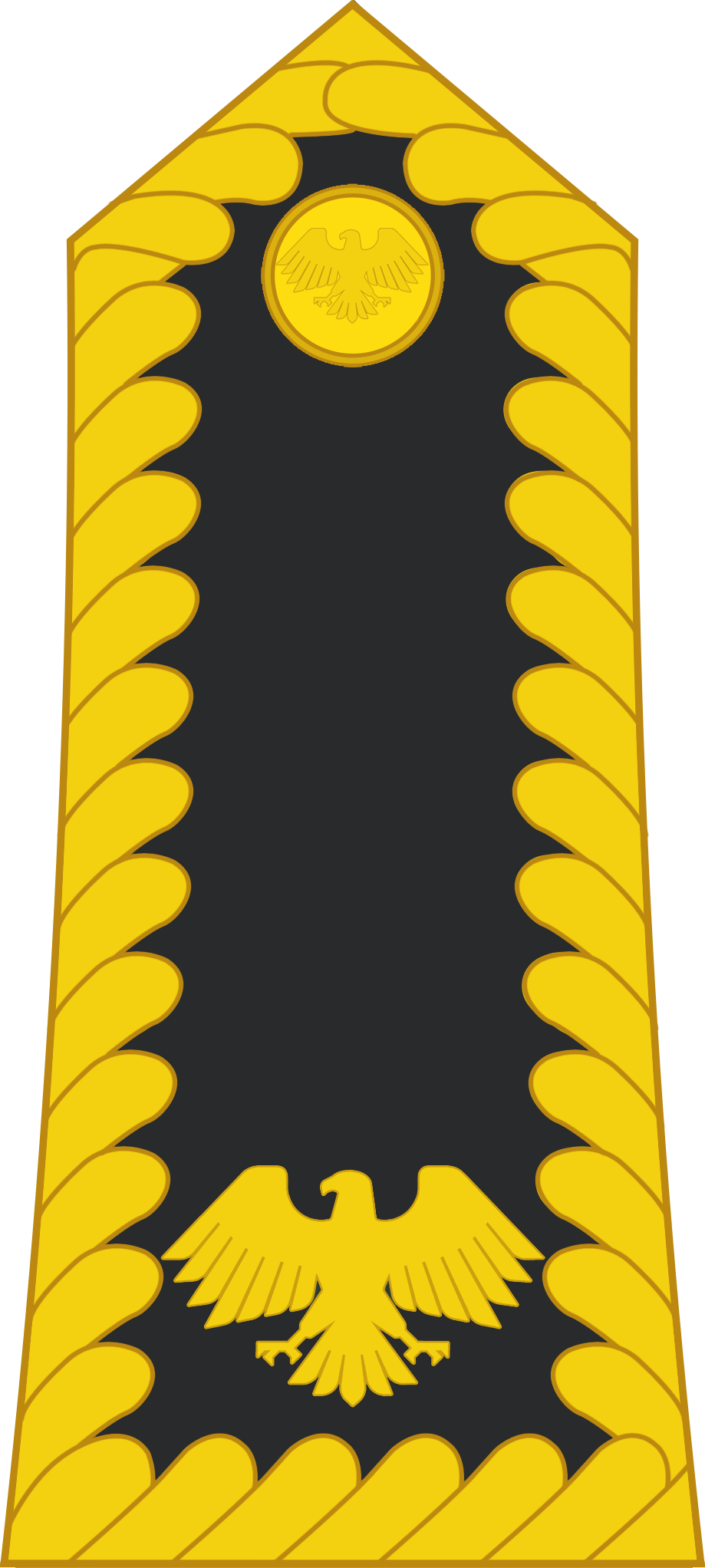
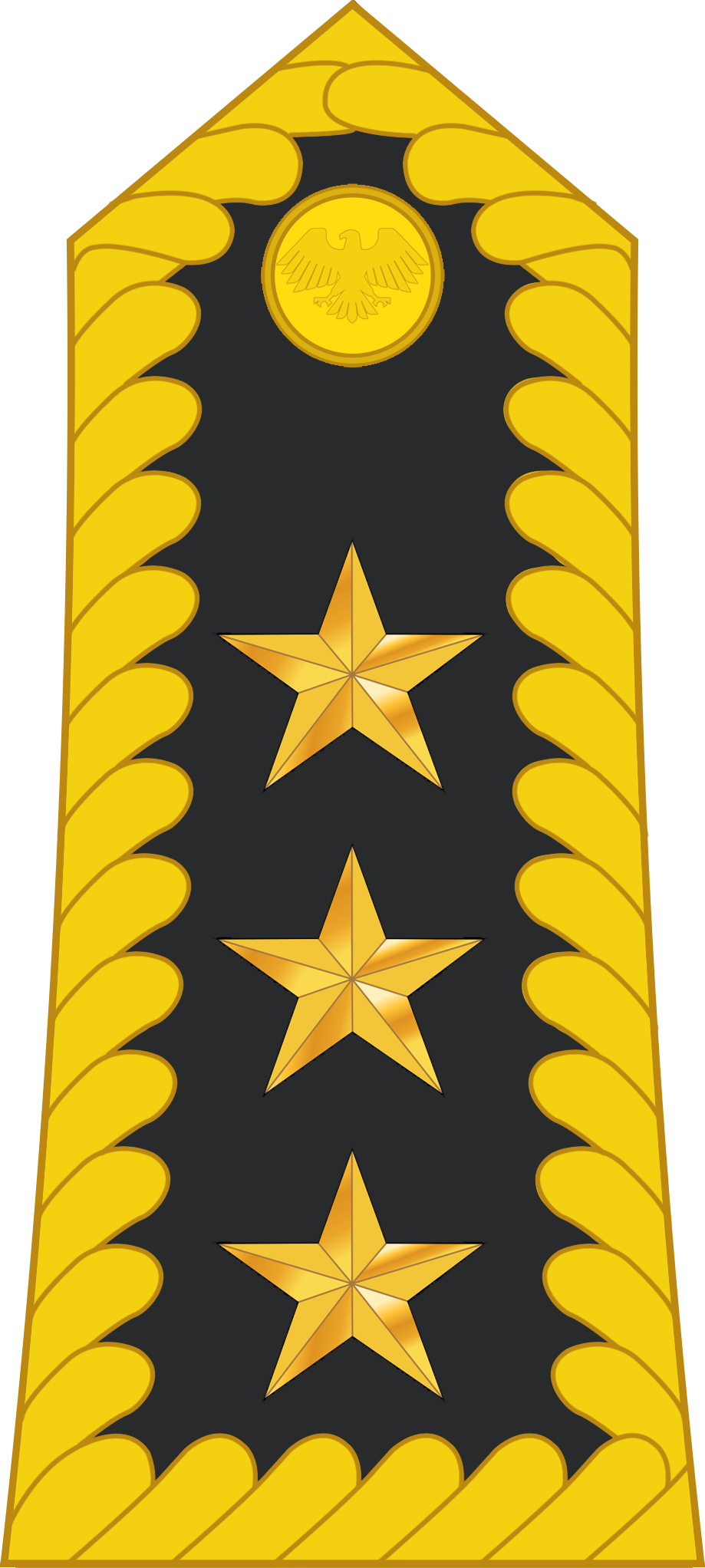
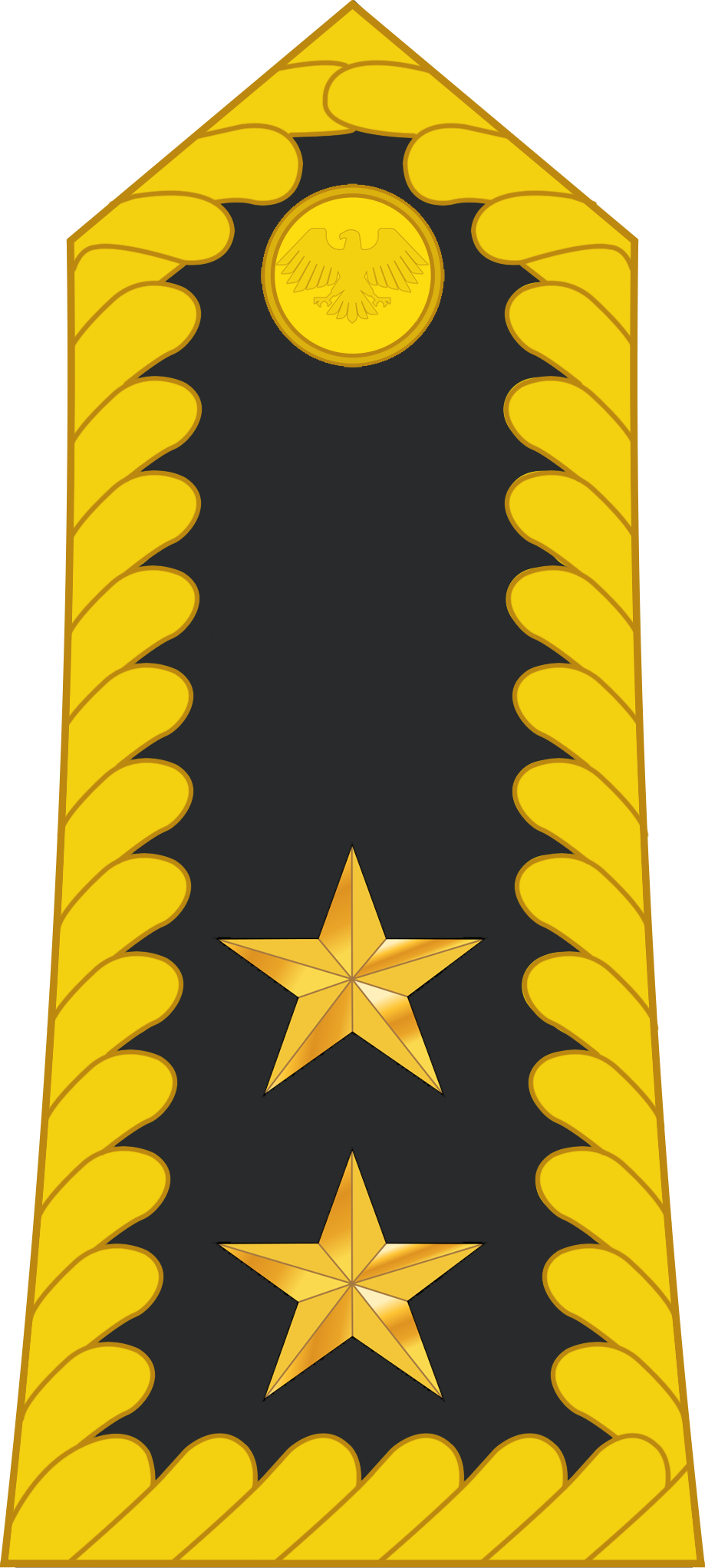
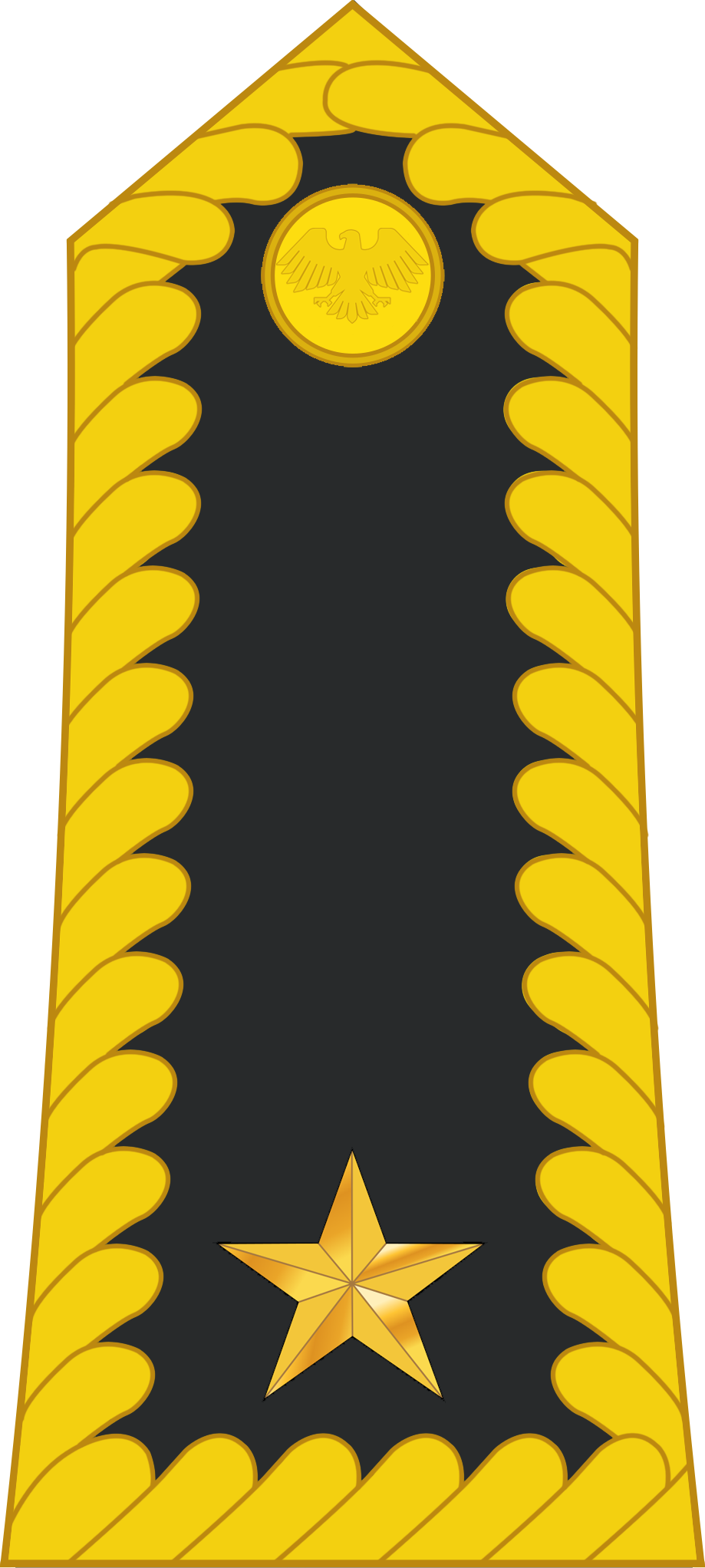
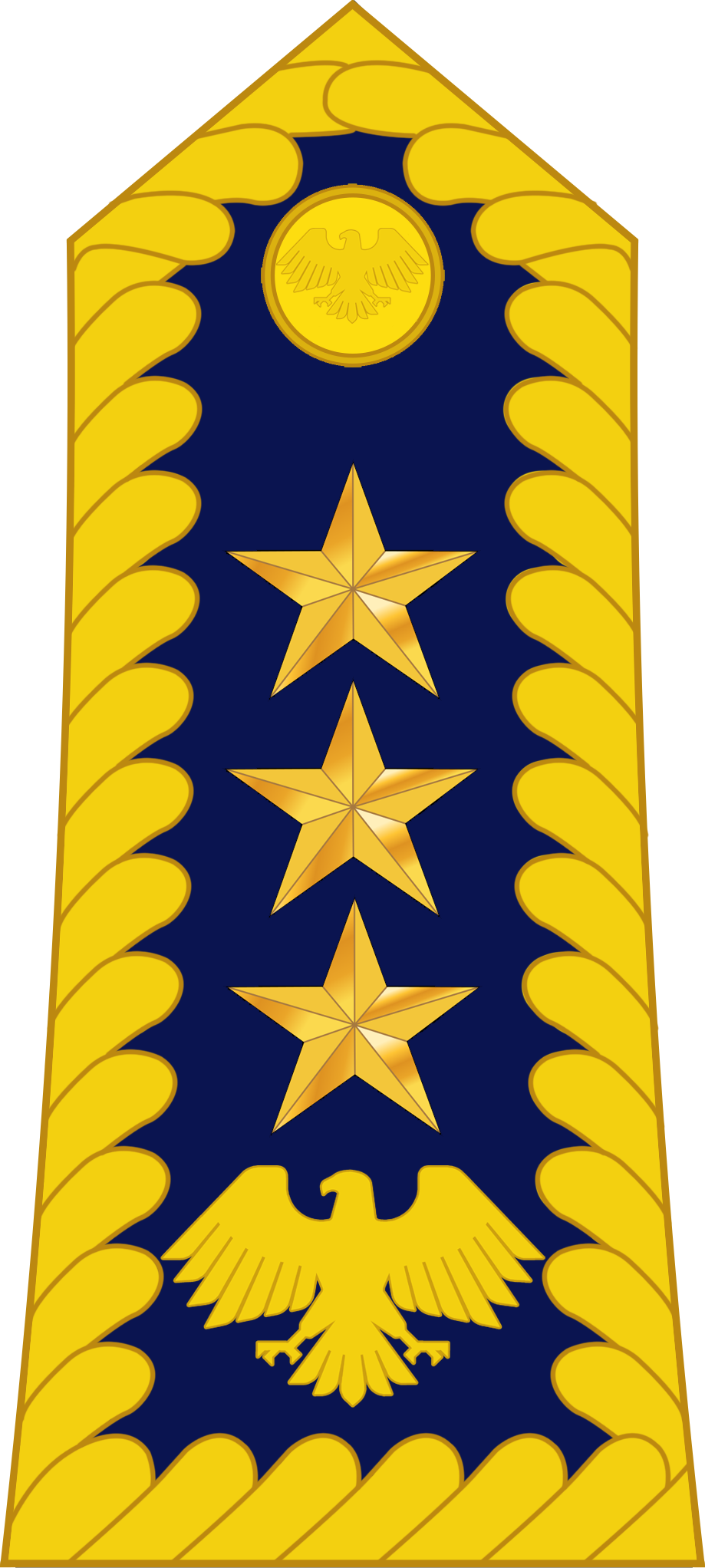
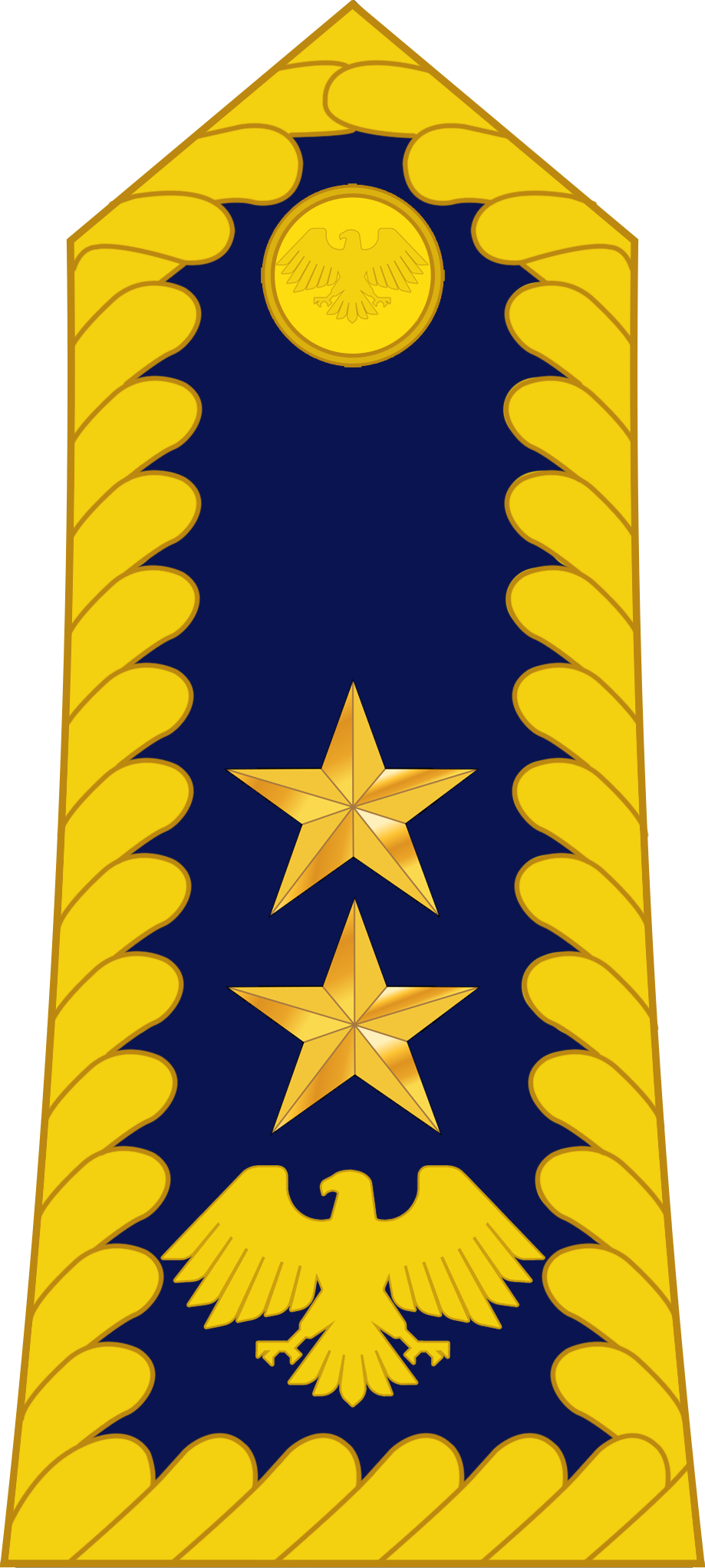
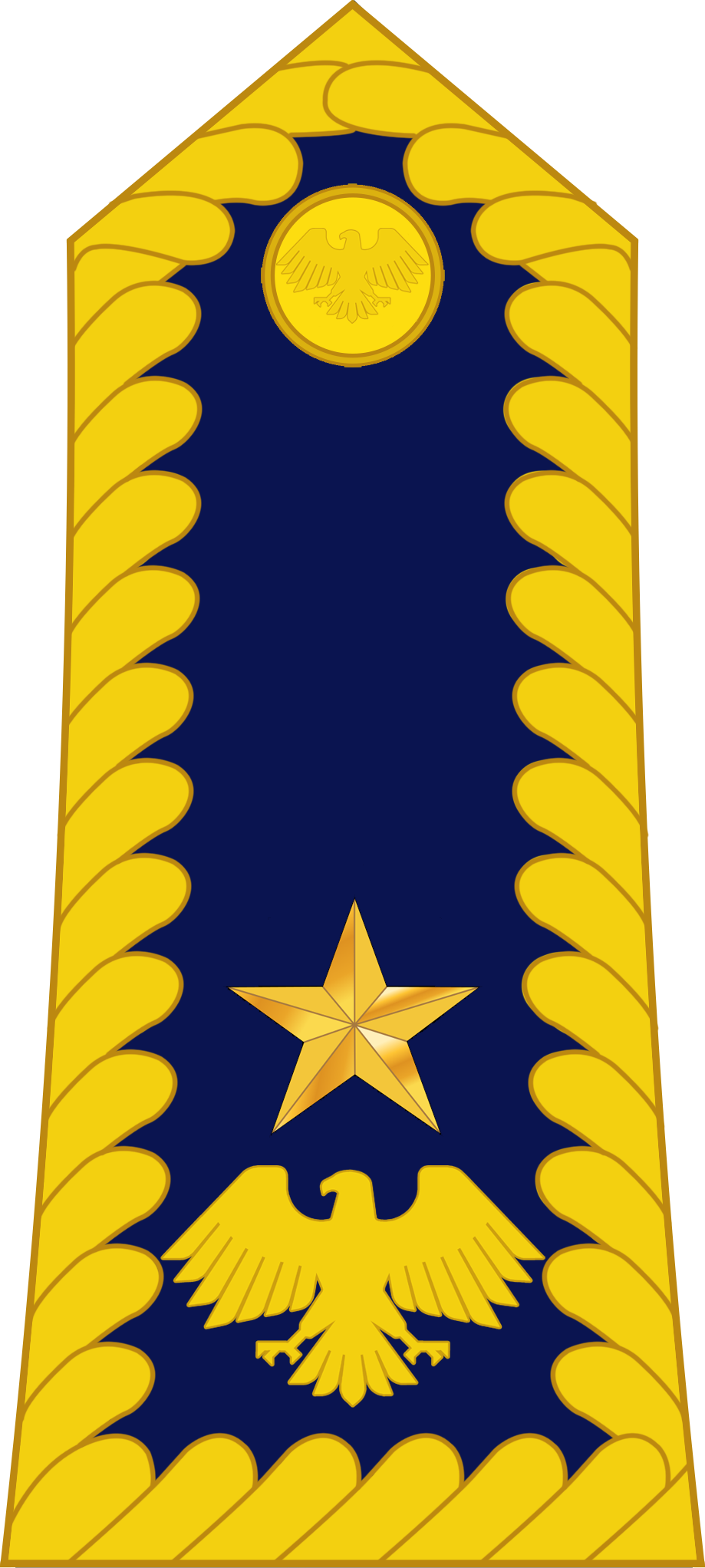
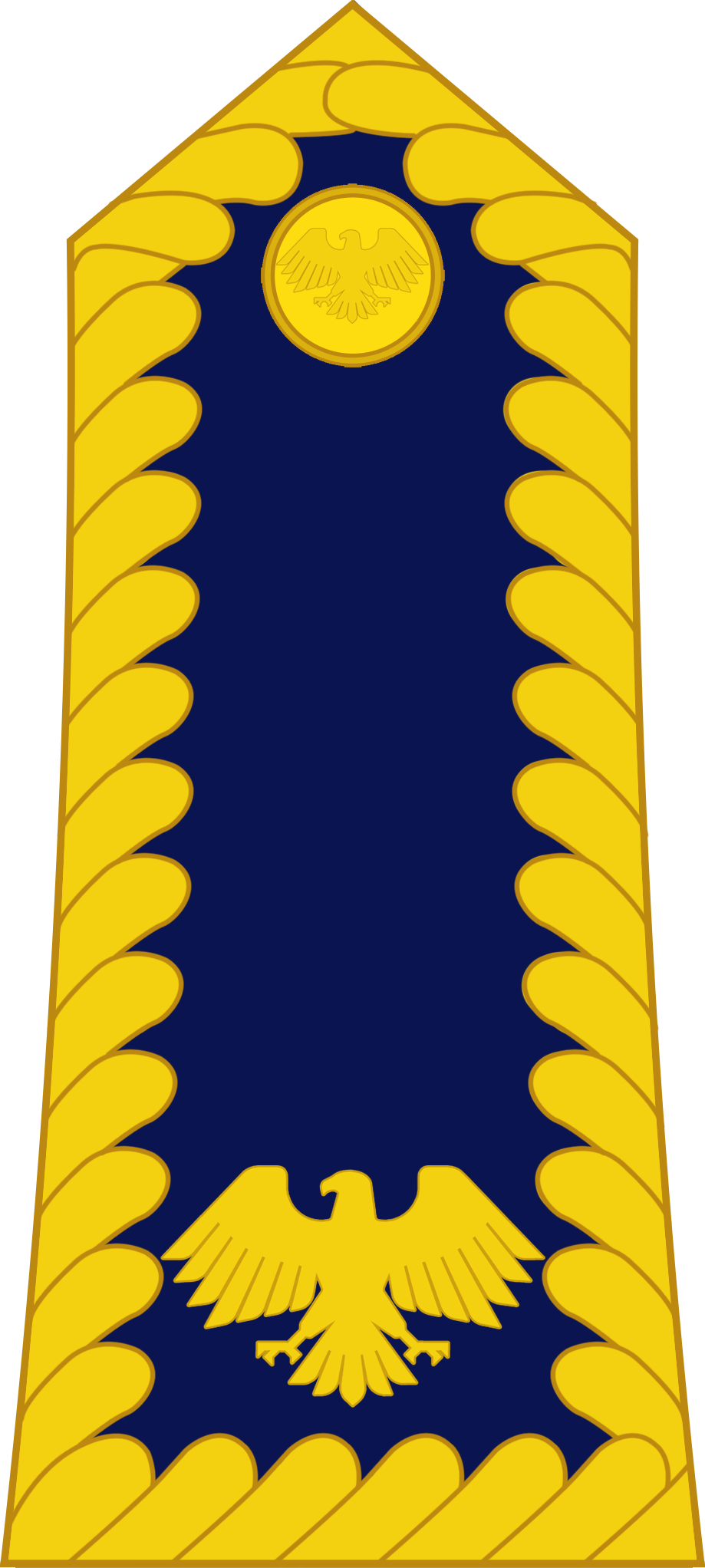
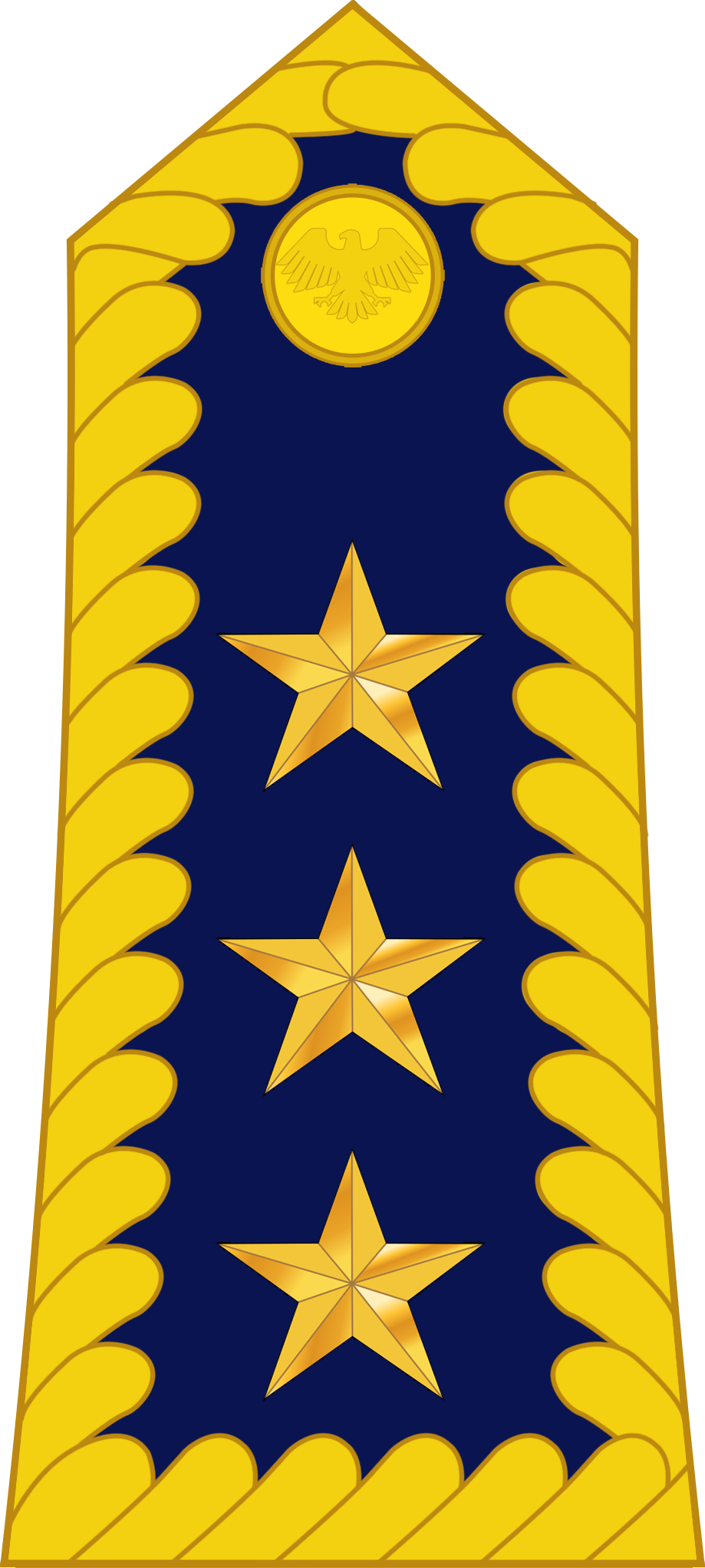
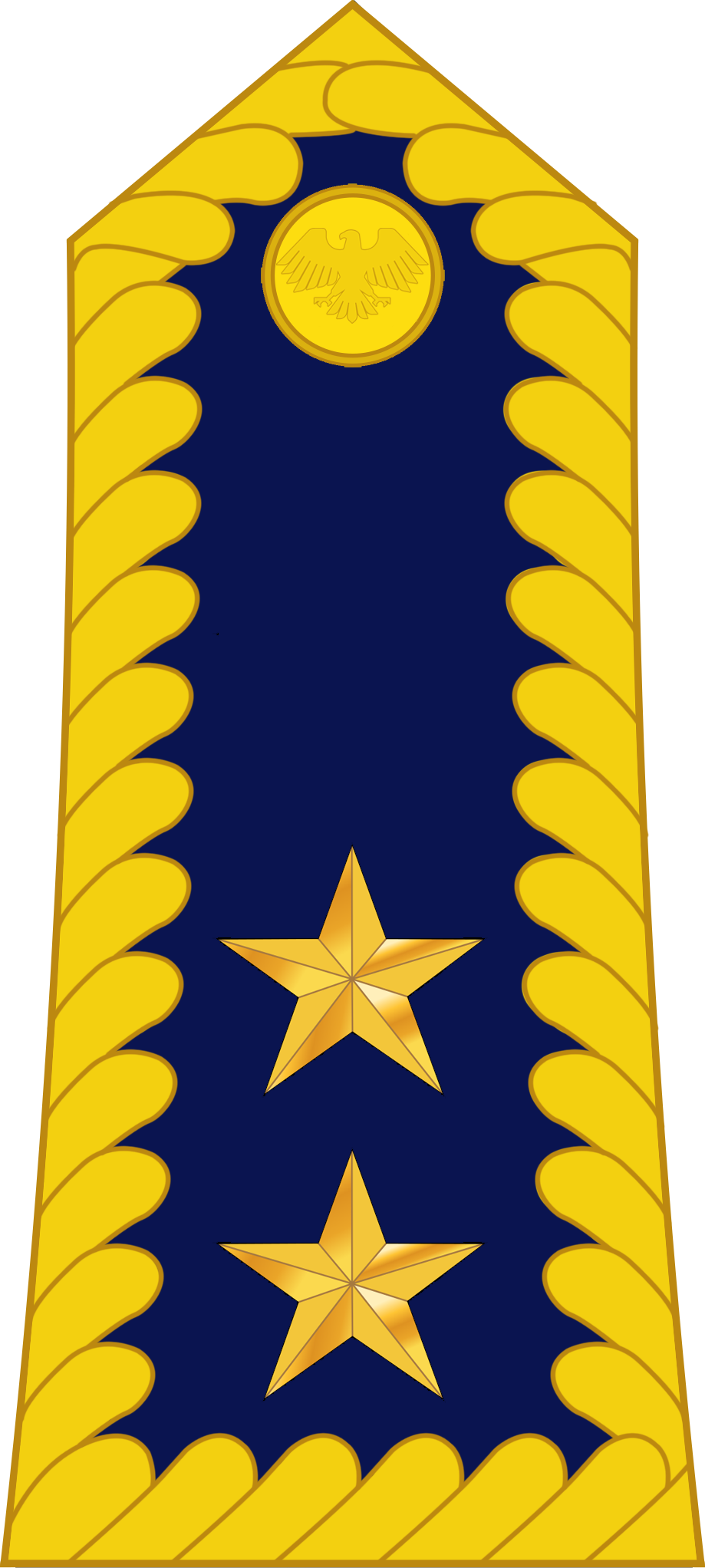
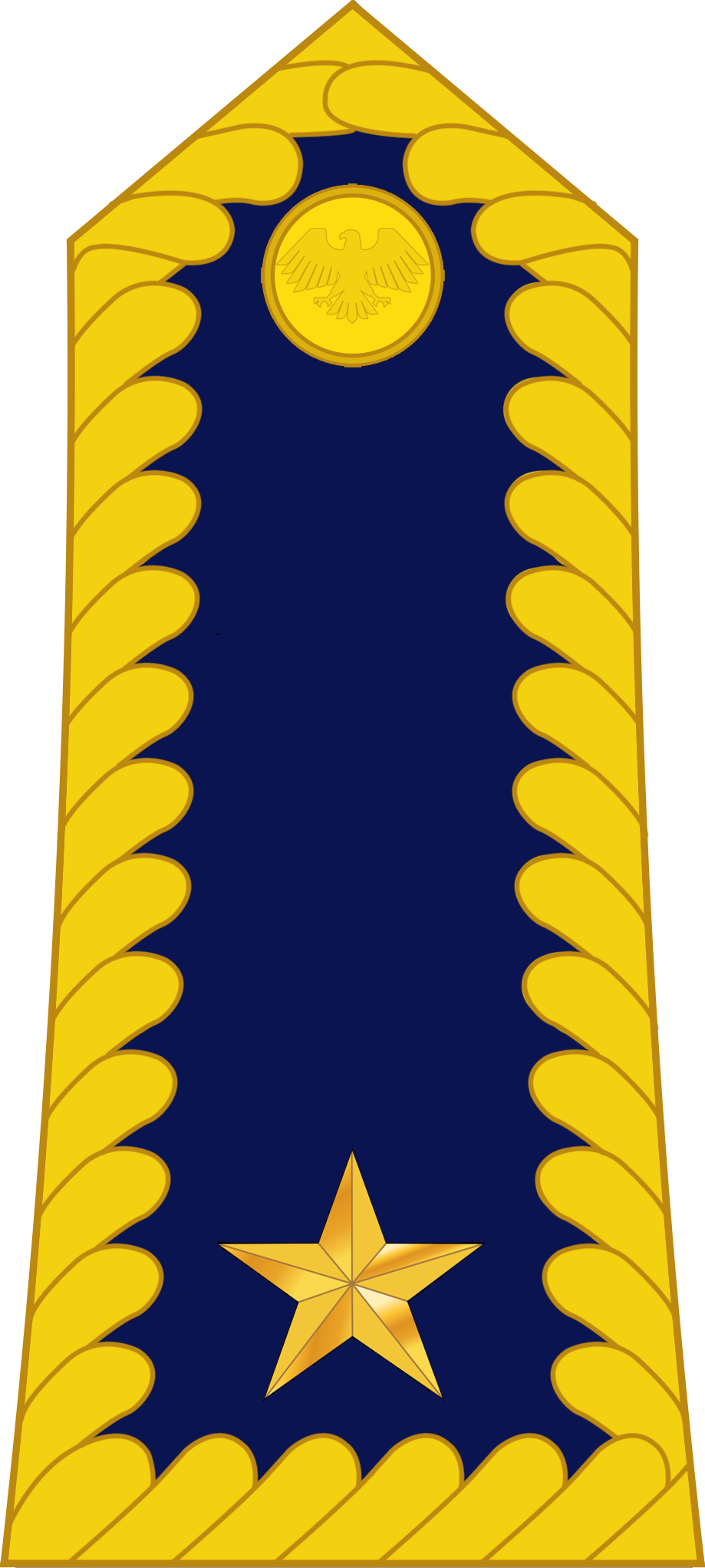
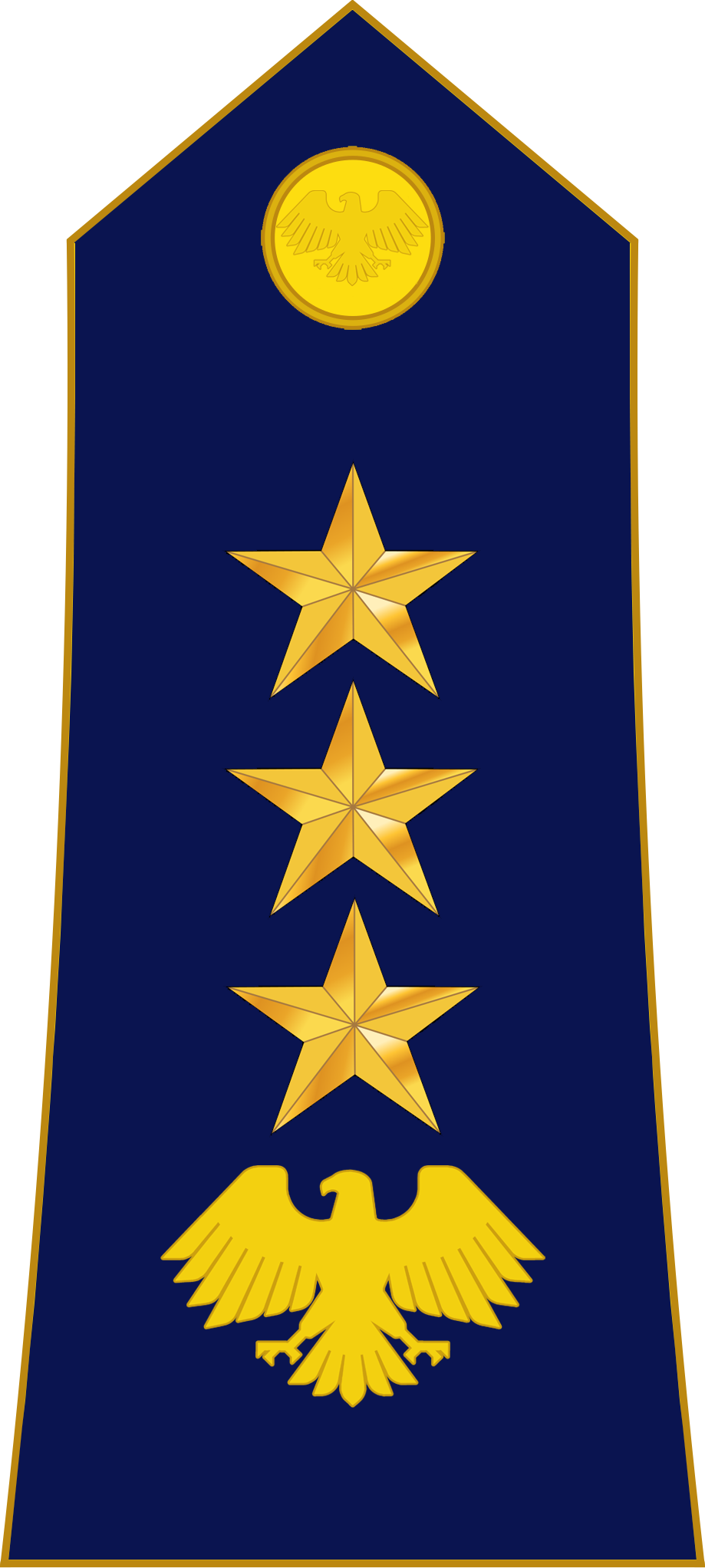
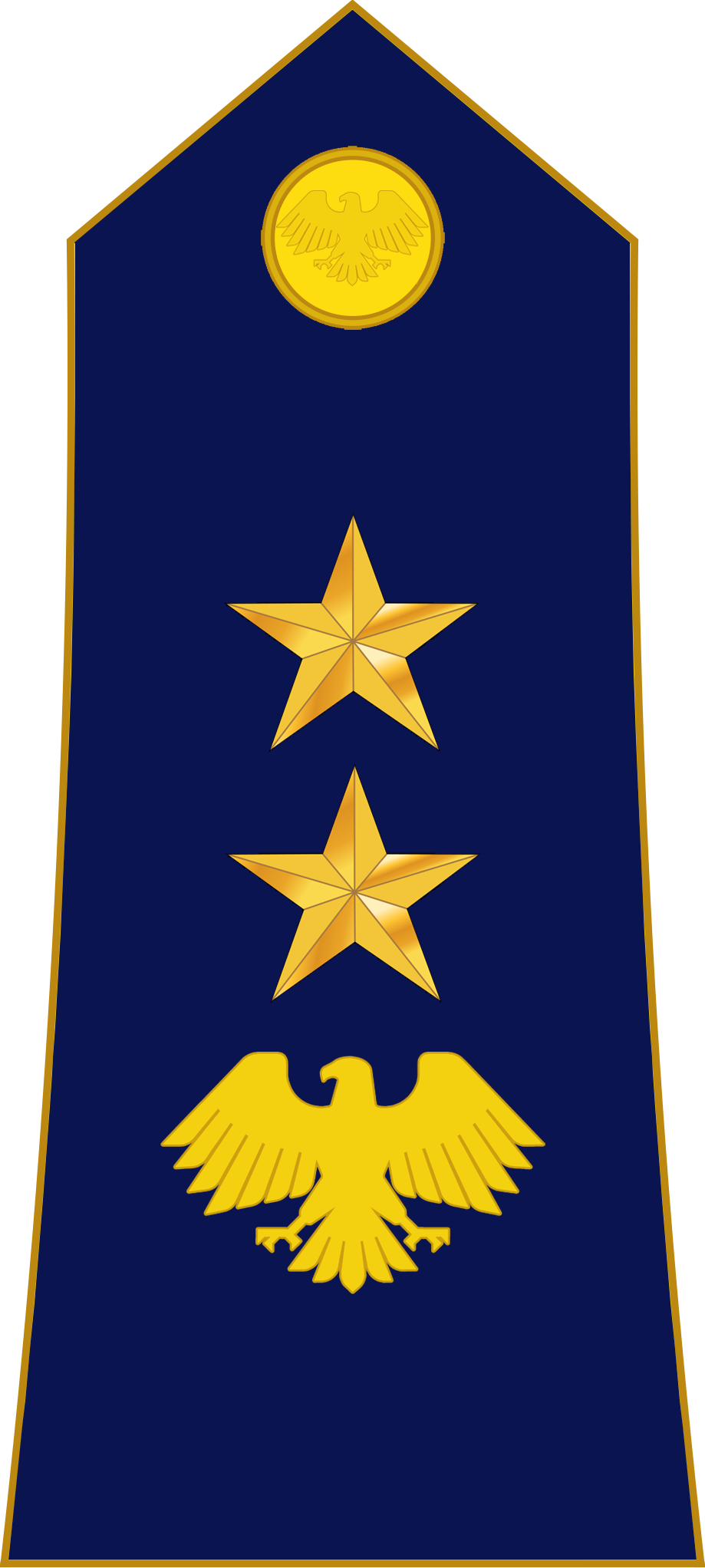
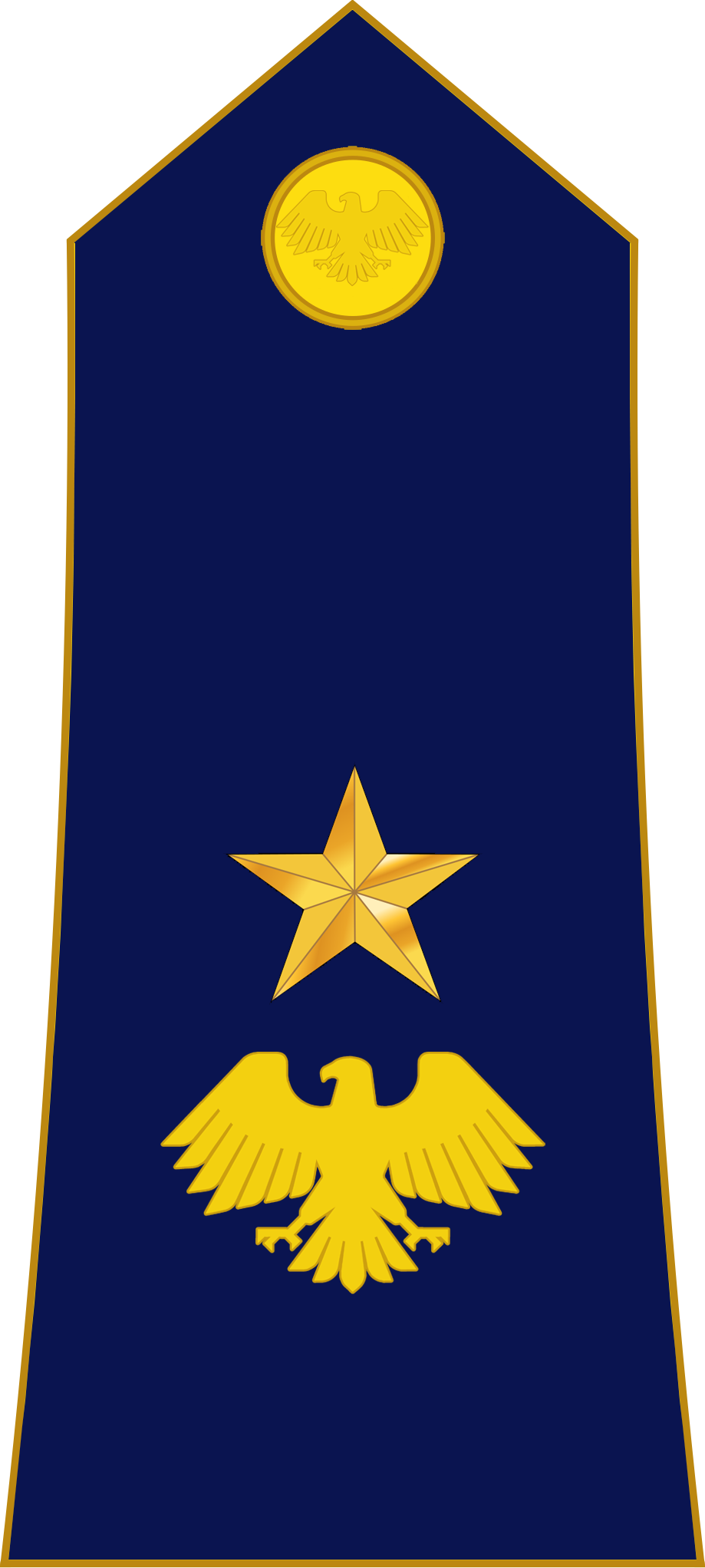
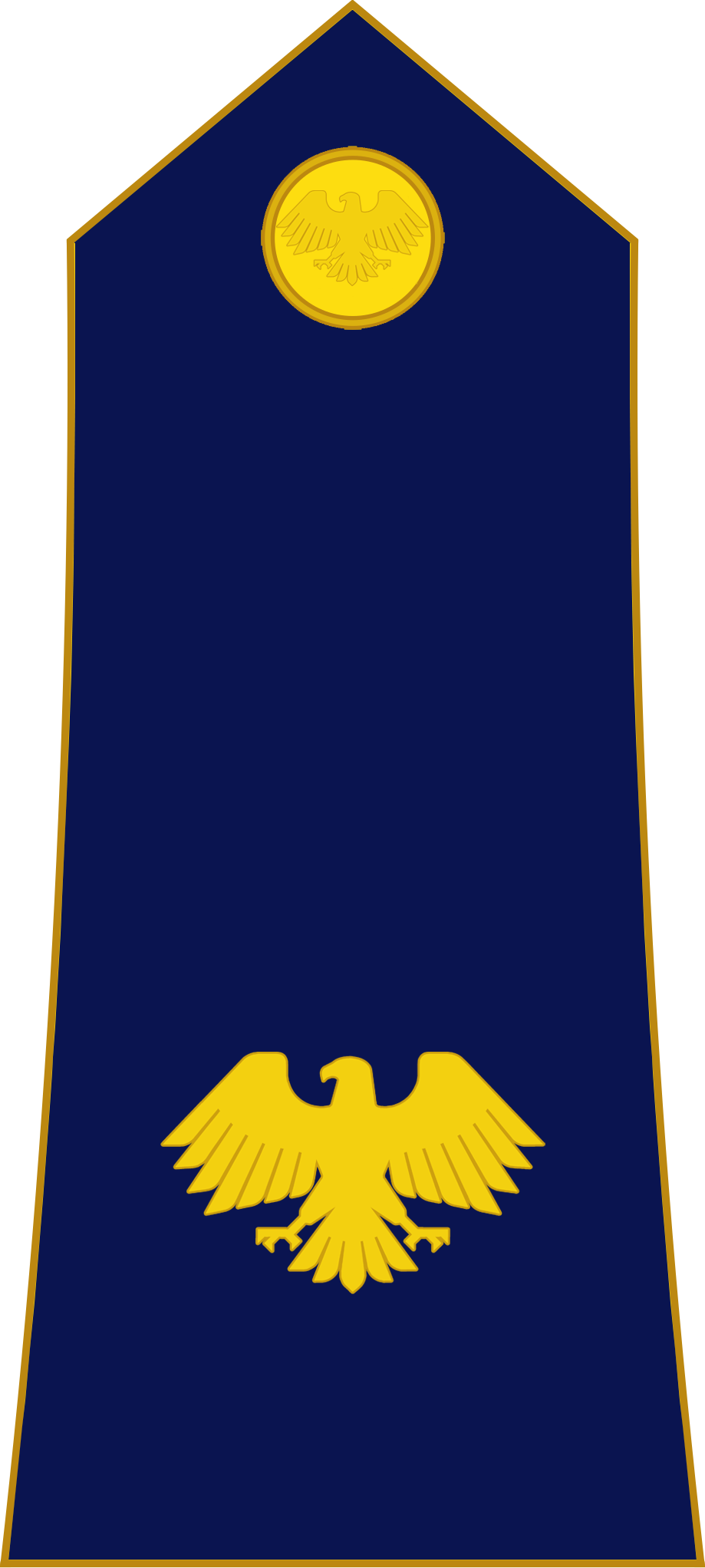
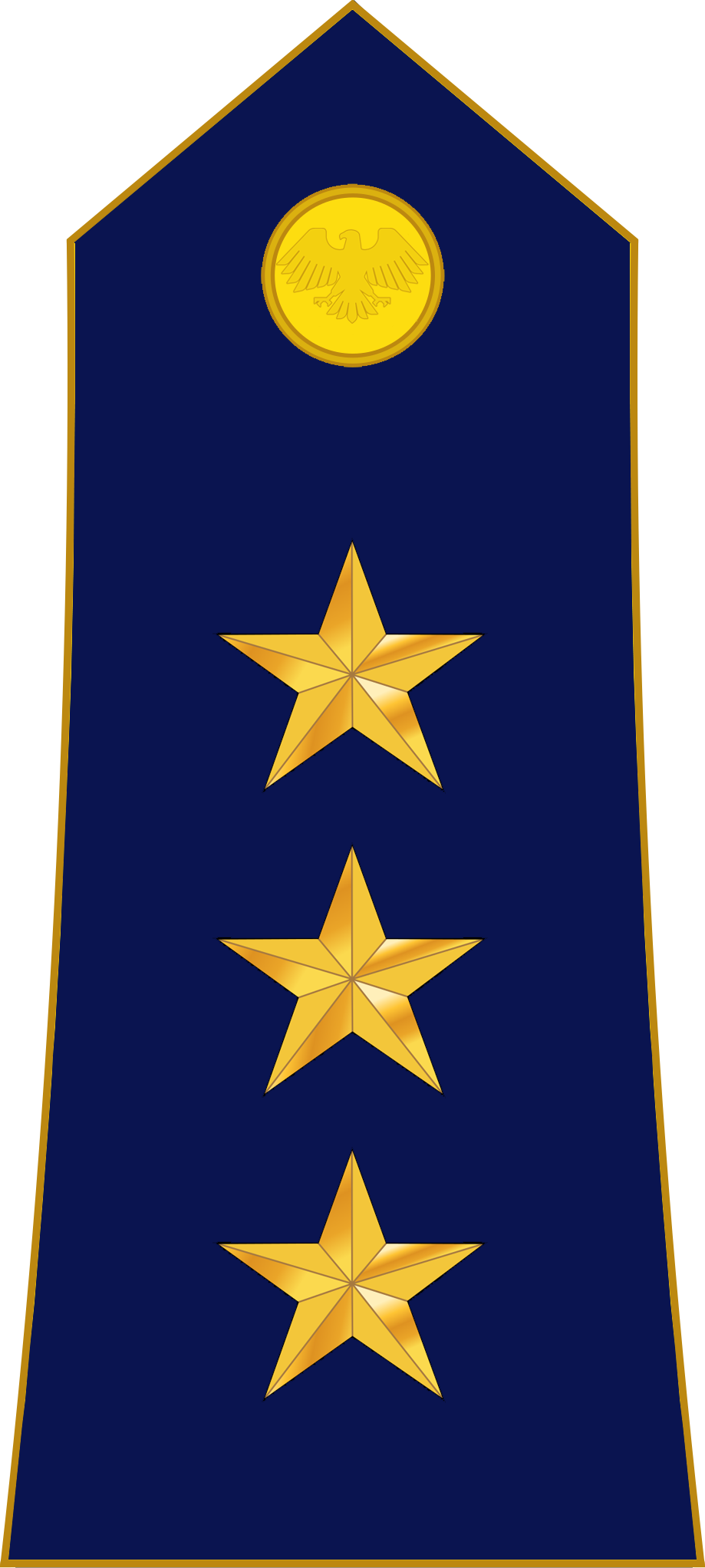
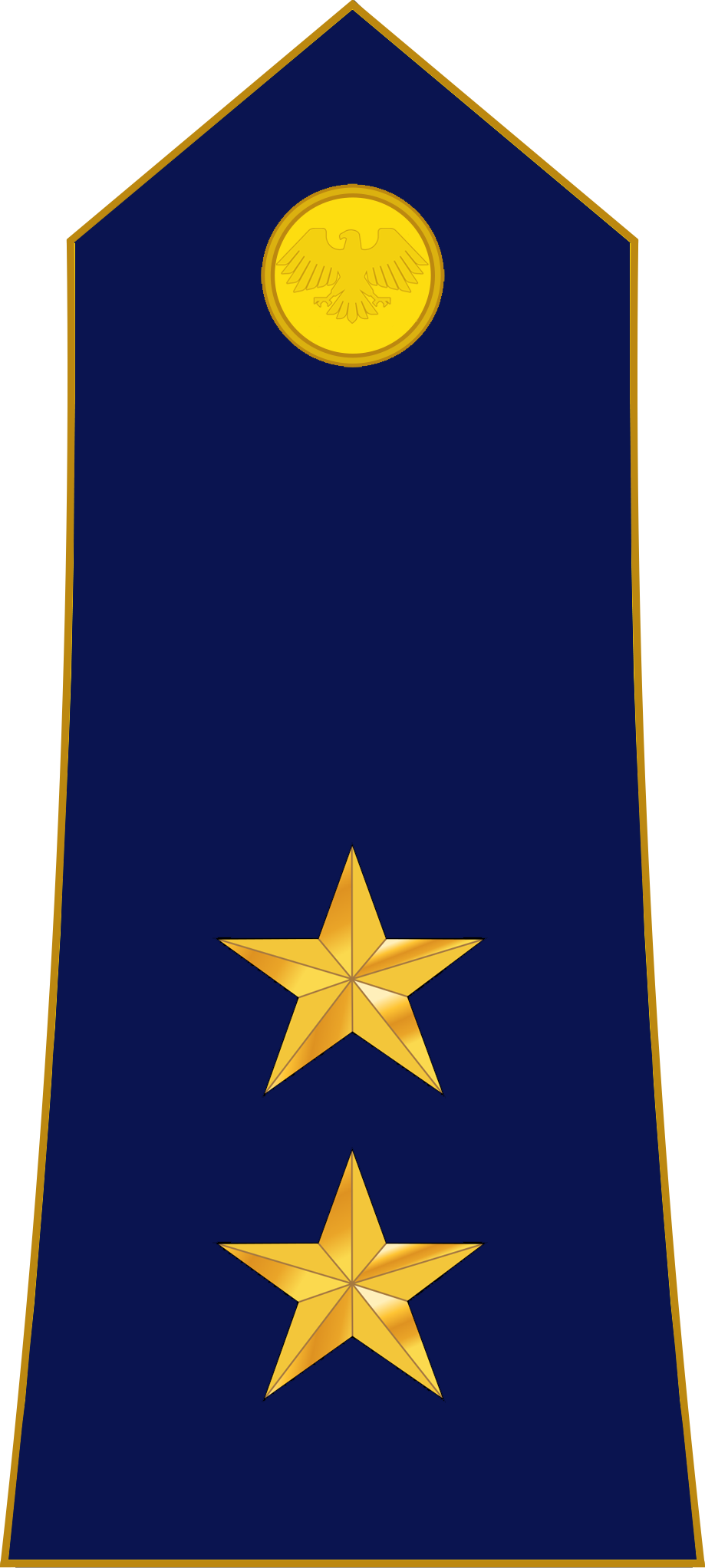
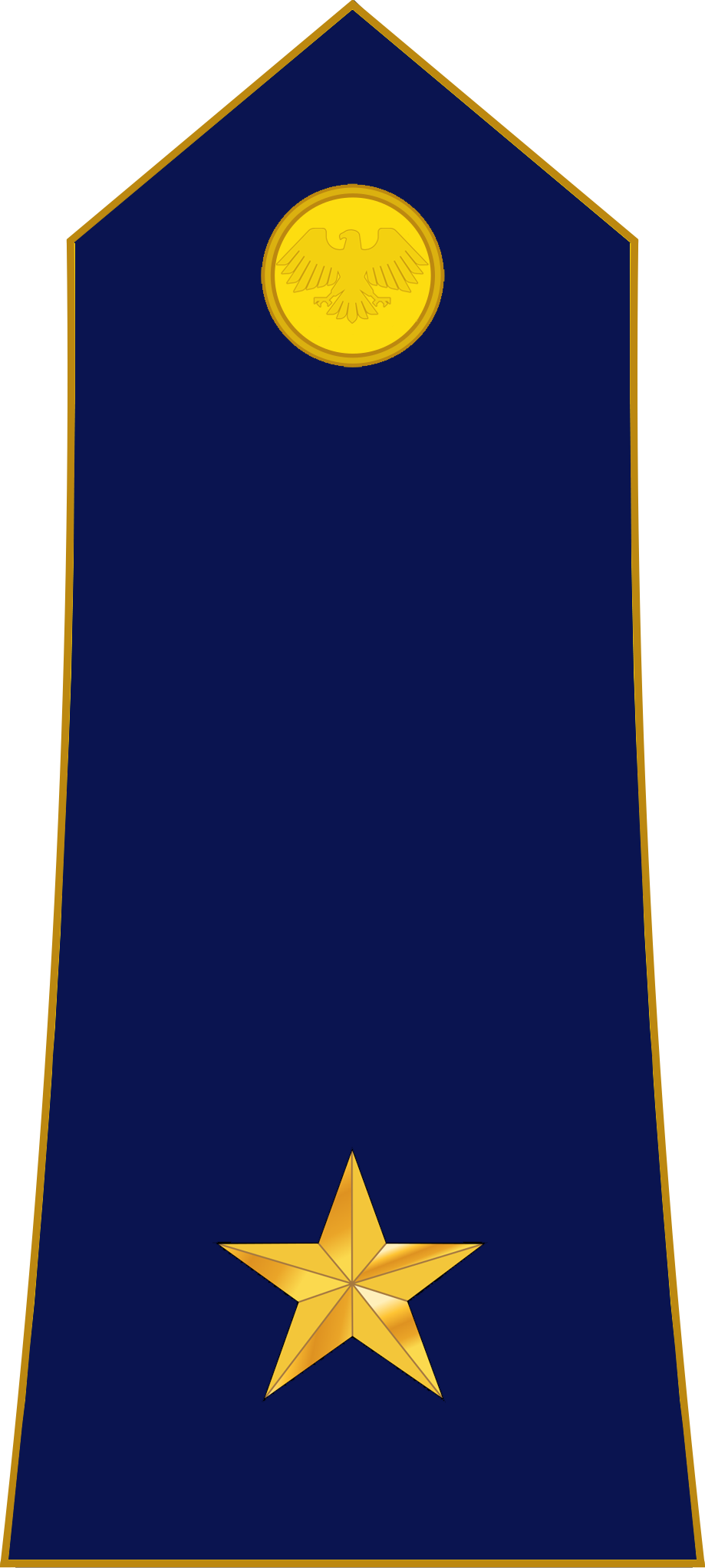
Rank group	General / flag officers					Senior officers			Junior officers
Rank	فريق	عماد أول	عماد	لواء	عميد	عقيد	مقدم	رائد	نقيب	ملازم أول	ملازم
Romanization	Fariq	Eimad 'awal	Eimad	Alliwa'	Amid	Aqid	Muqaddam	Ra'id	Naqib	Mulazim awwal	Mulazim
Joint combat uniform
Army Full dress uniform
Army Service dress uniform
Navy Full dress uniform
Air force Full dress uniform
Air force Service dress uniform
Rank group	General / flag officers					Senior officers			Junior officers

=== Other ranks ===
The rank insignia of non-commissioned officers and enlisted personnel.

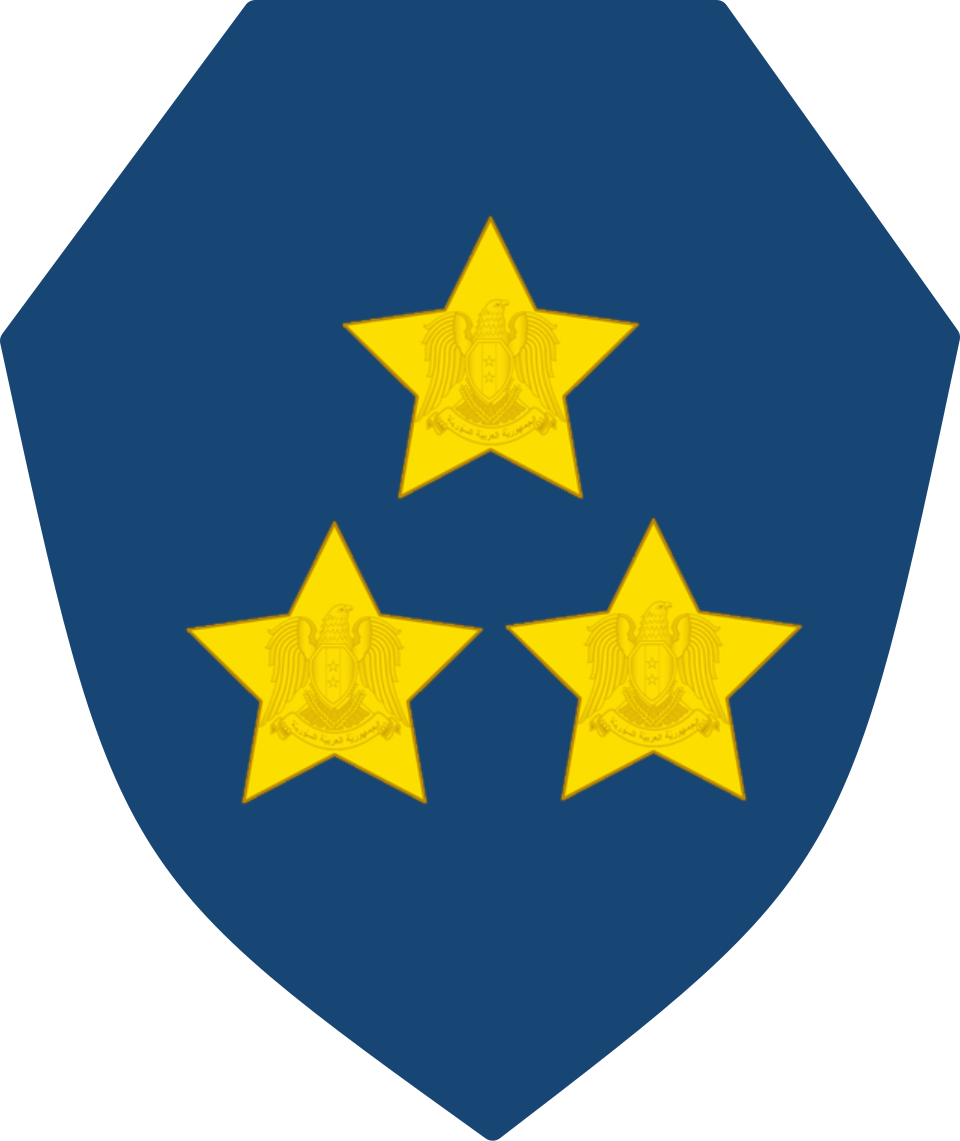
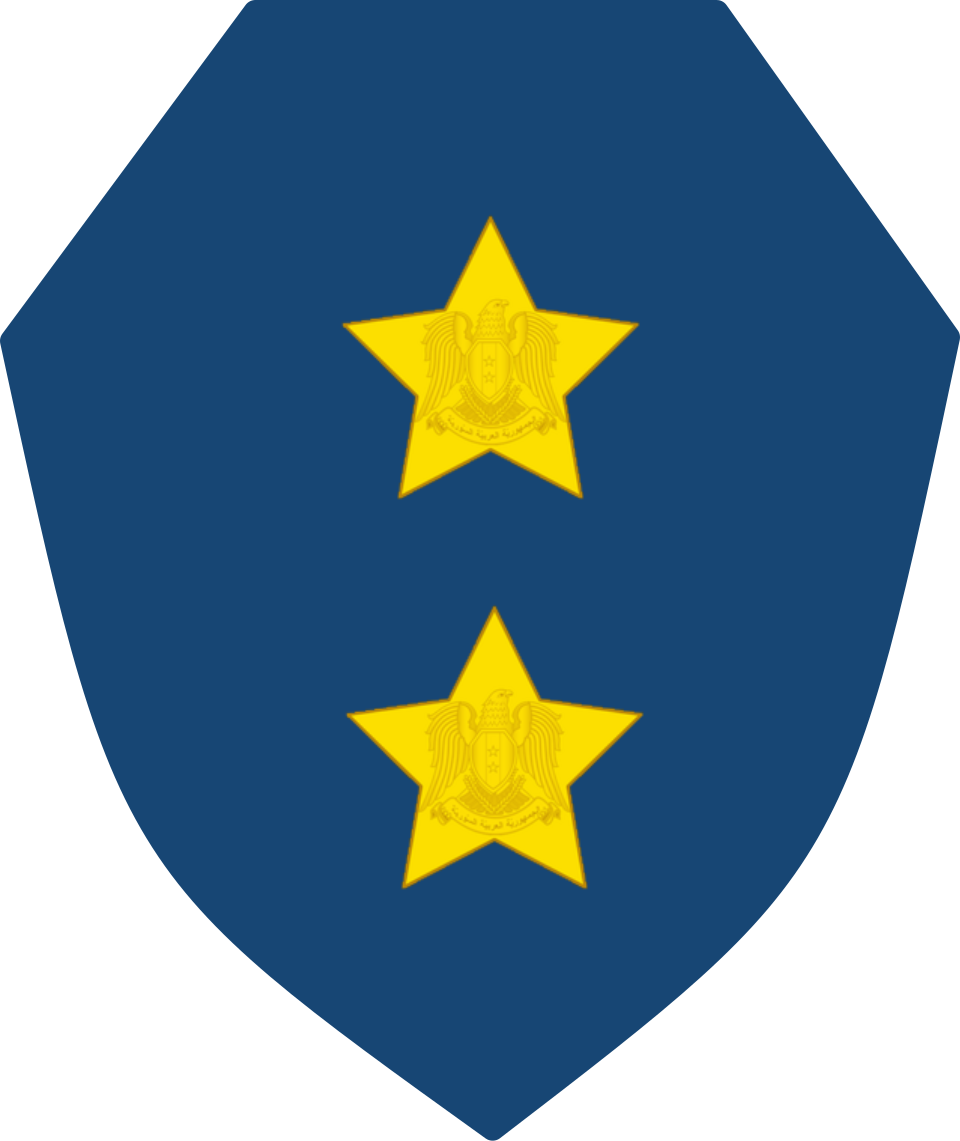
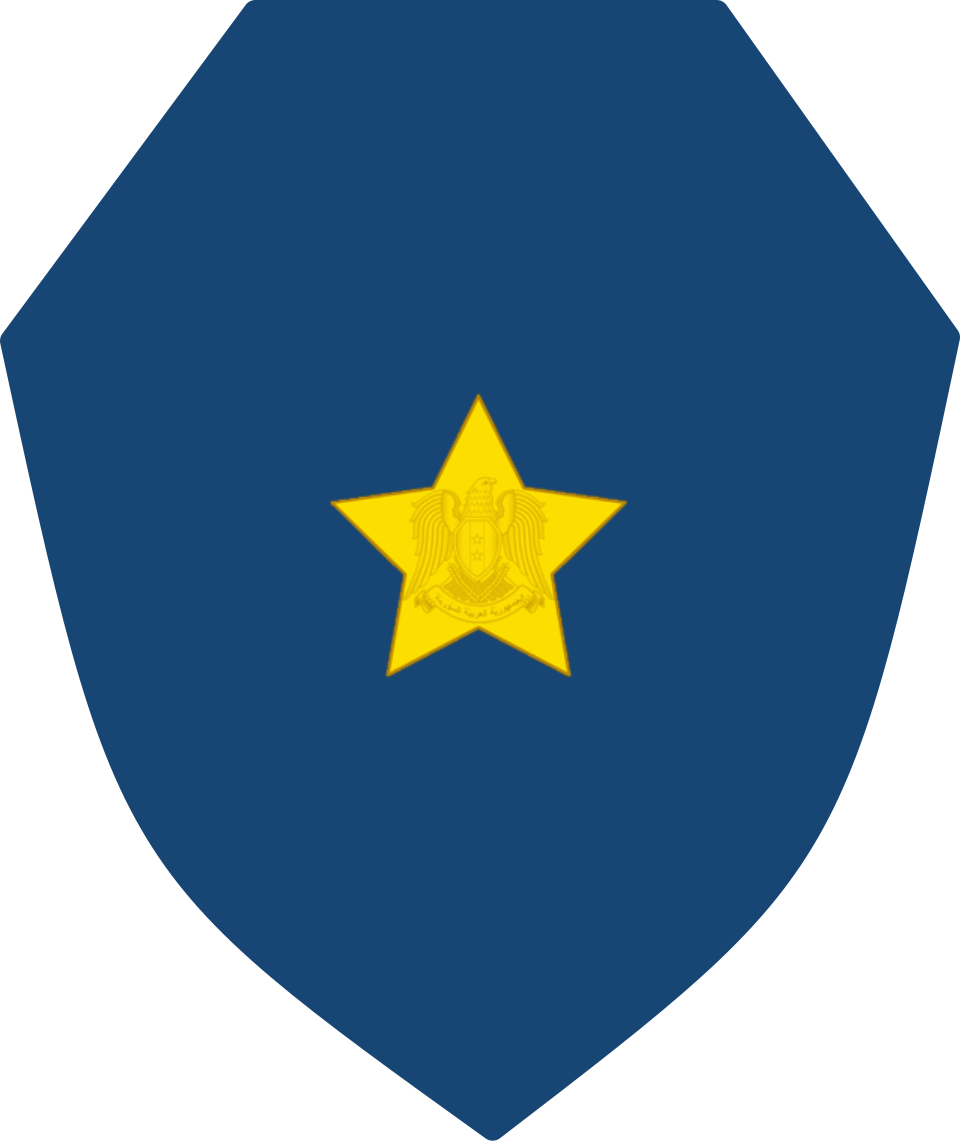
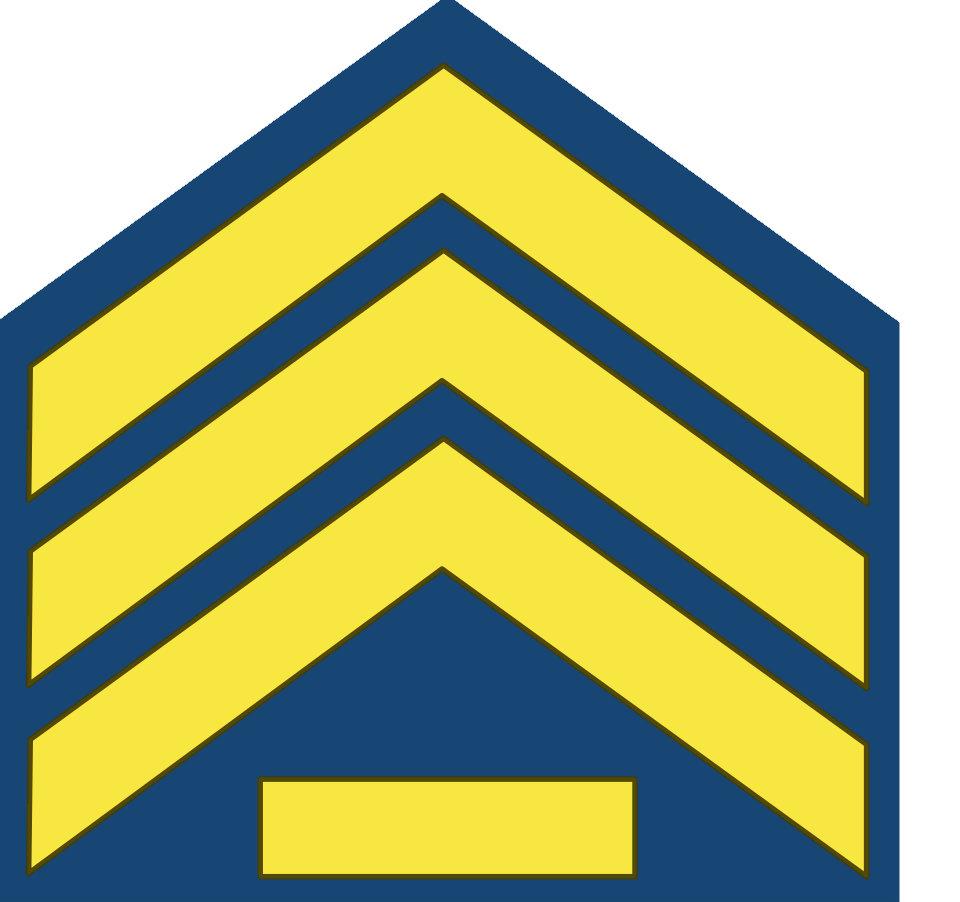
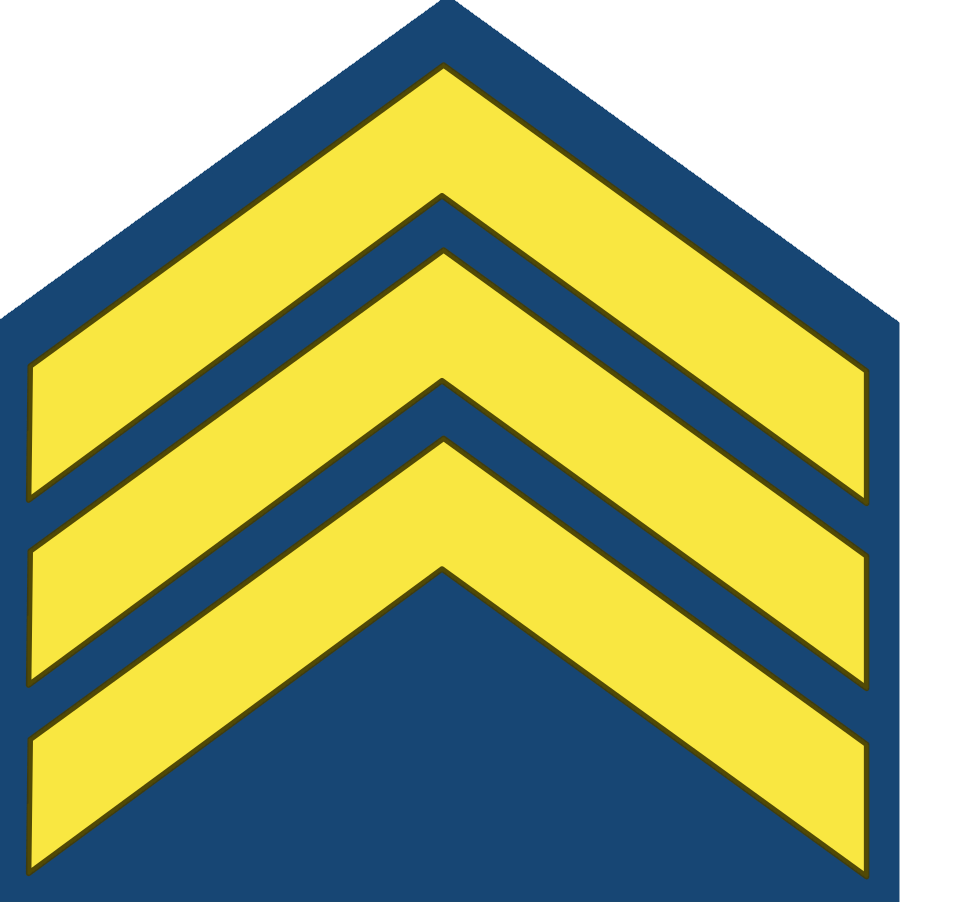
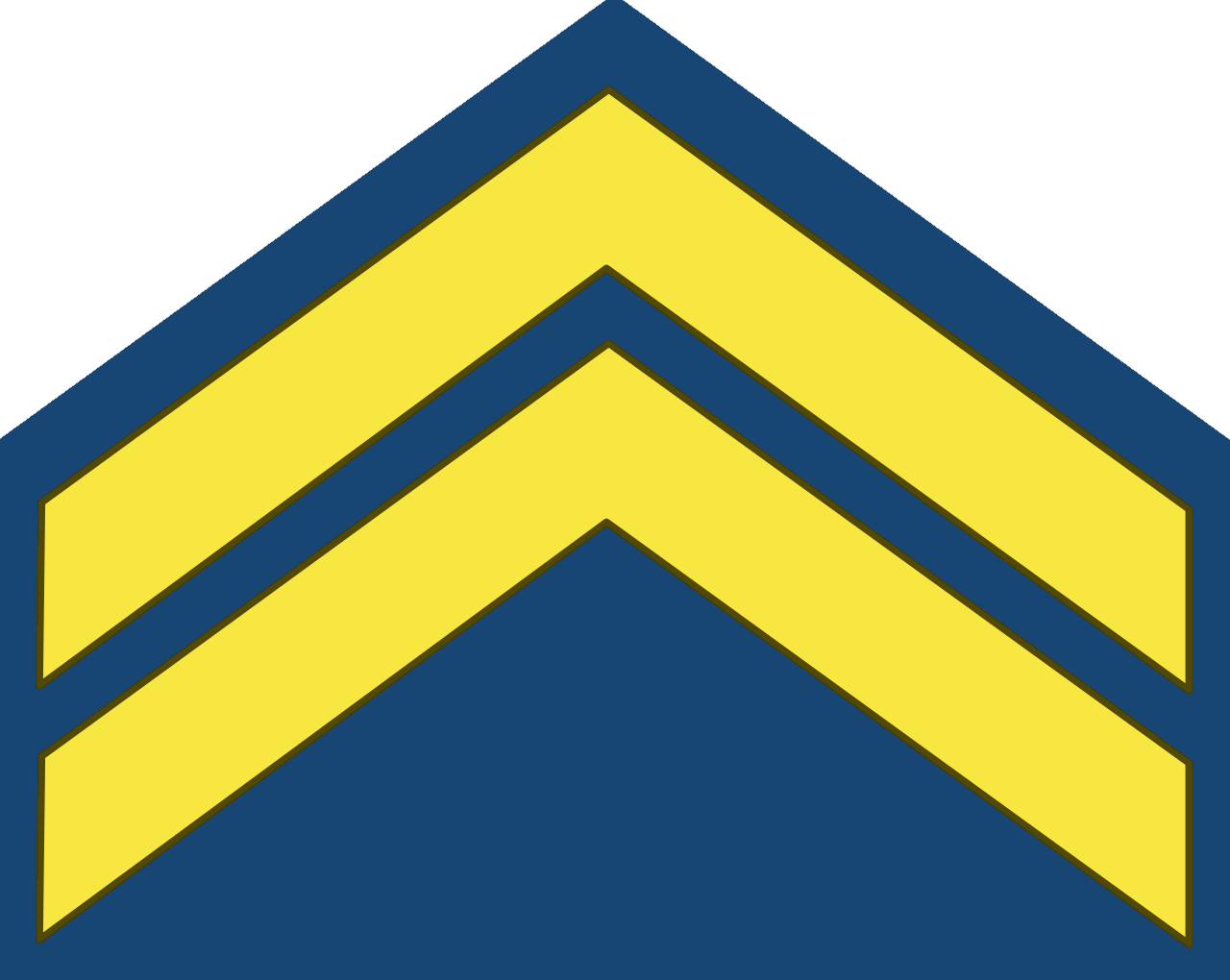
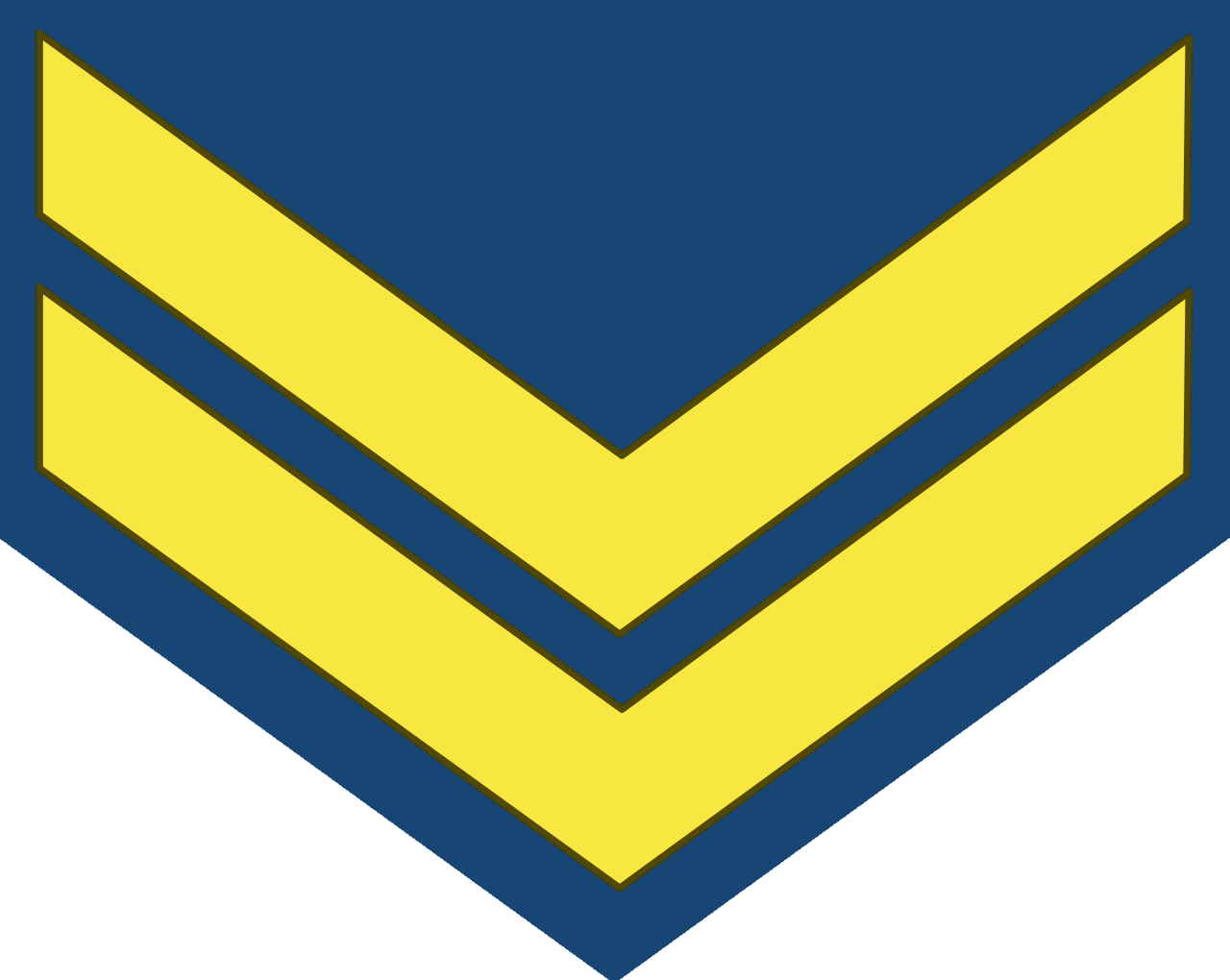
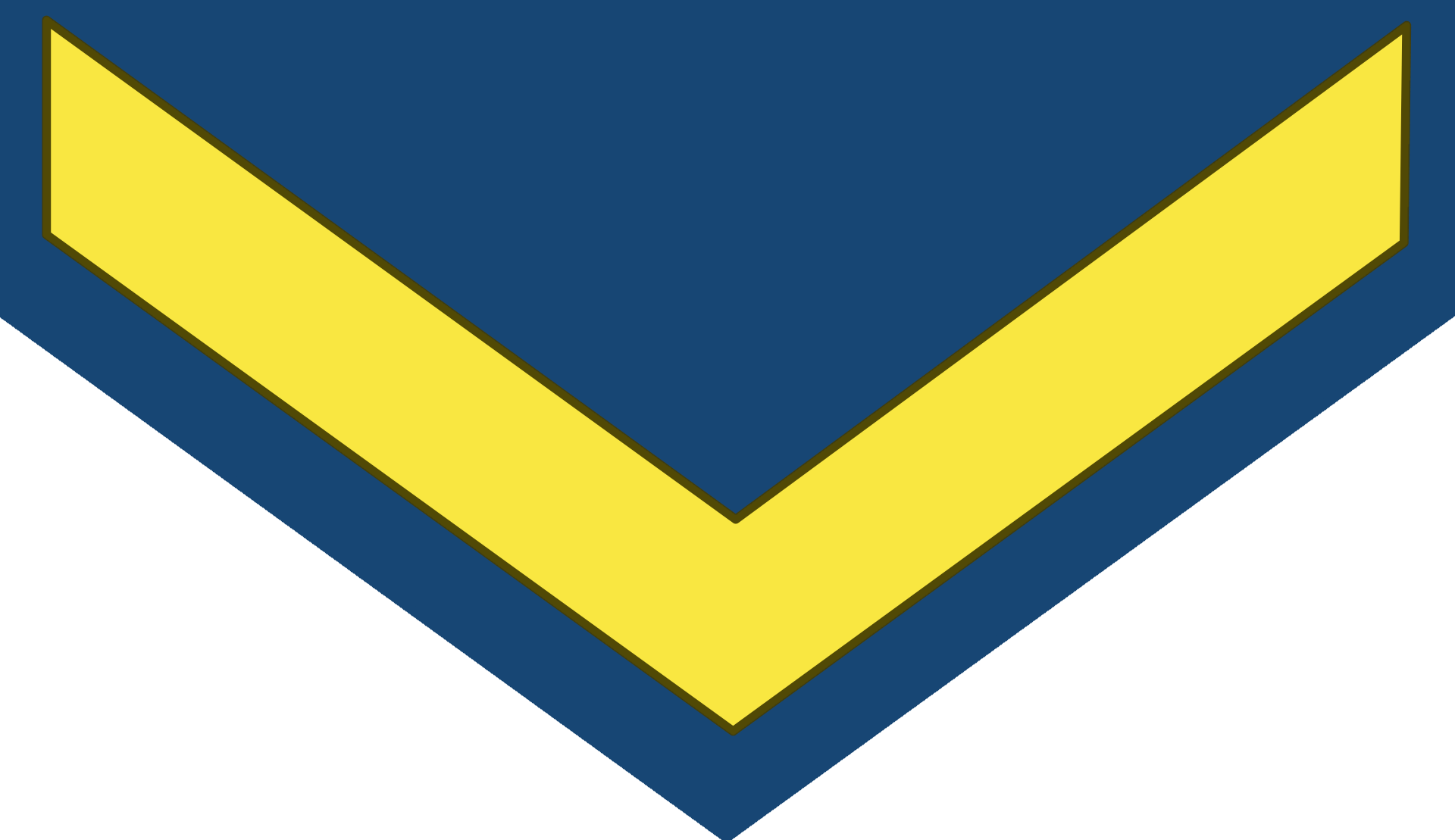
Rank group	Senior NCOs						Junior NCOs	Enlisted
Rank	مساعد أول	مساعد ثاني	مساعد	رقيب أول	رقيب ثاني	رقيب	عريف	جندي أول	جندي
Romanization	Musaeid 'awal	Musaeid thani	Musaeid	Raqib 'awal	Raqib thani	Raqib	Earif	Jundiun 'awal	Jundiun
Syrian Army
Syrian Navy
Syrian Air Force									No insignia

== Historic rank insignia ==
=== Commissioned officer ranks ===
The rank insignia of commissioned officers.

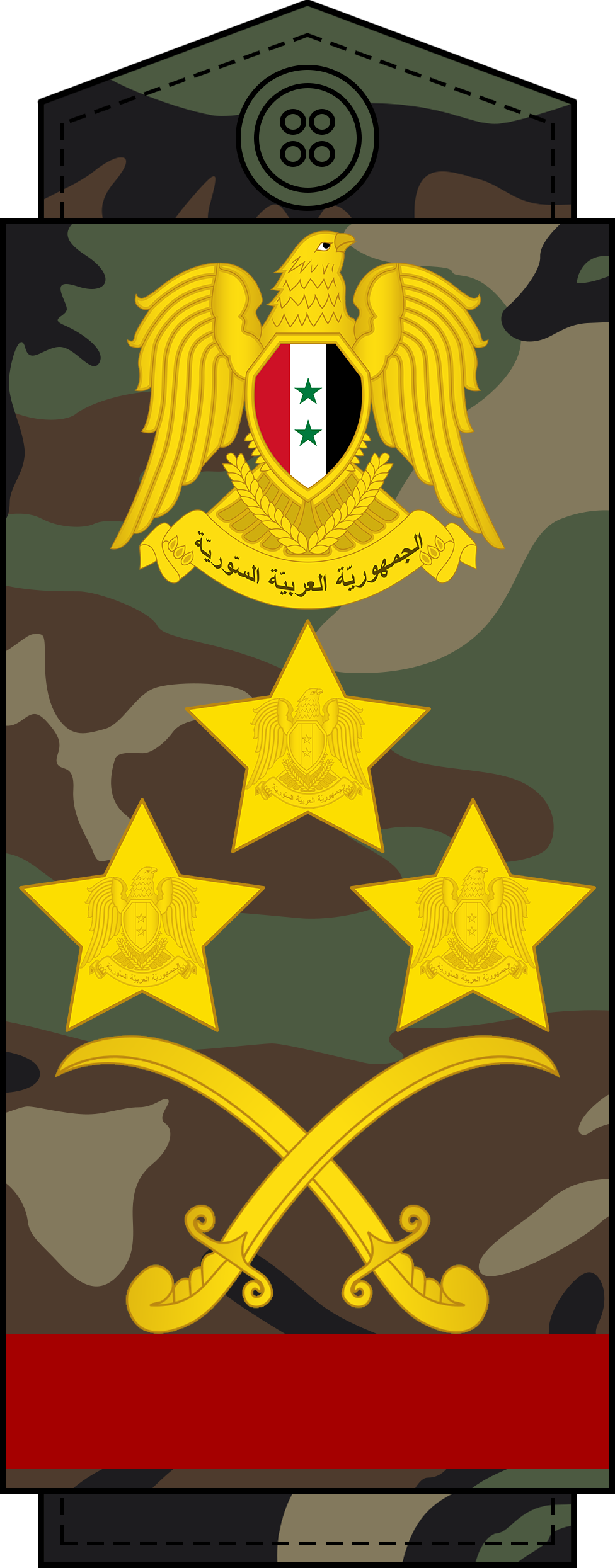
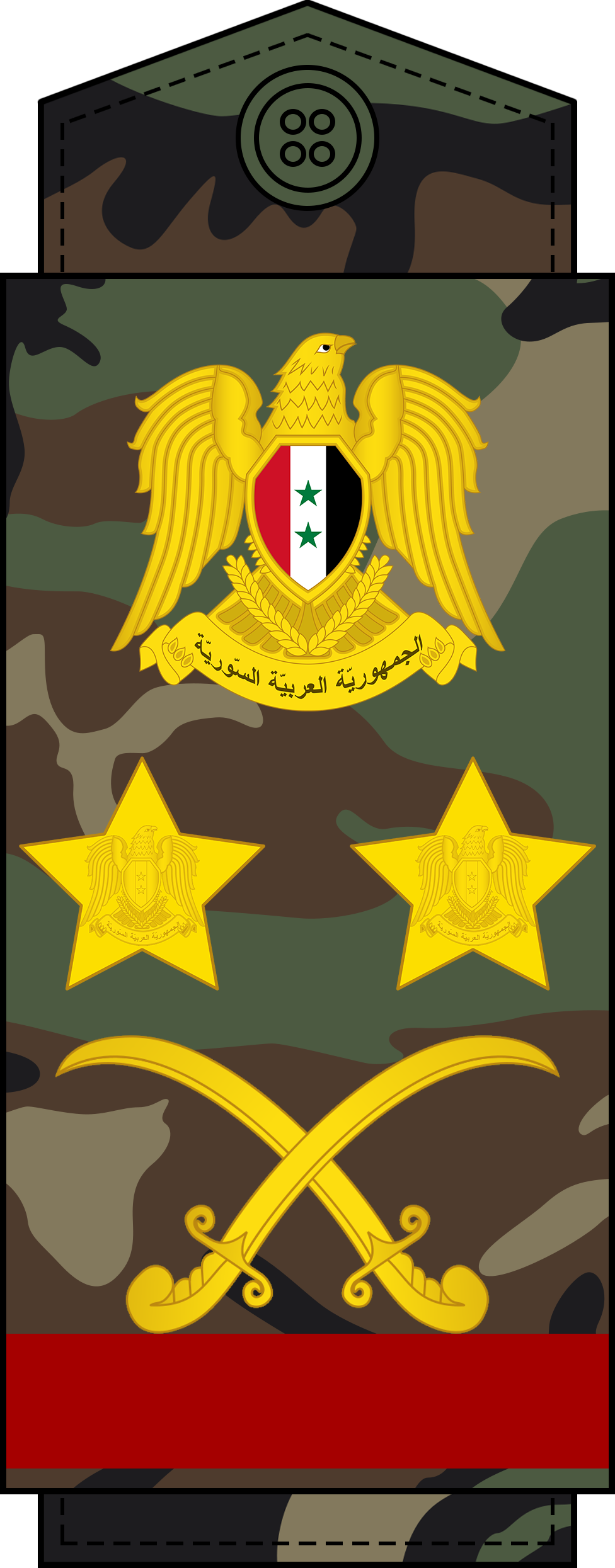
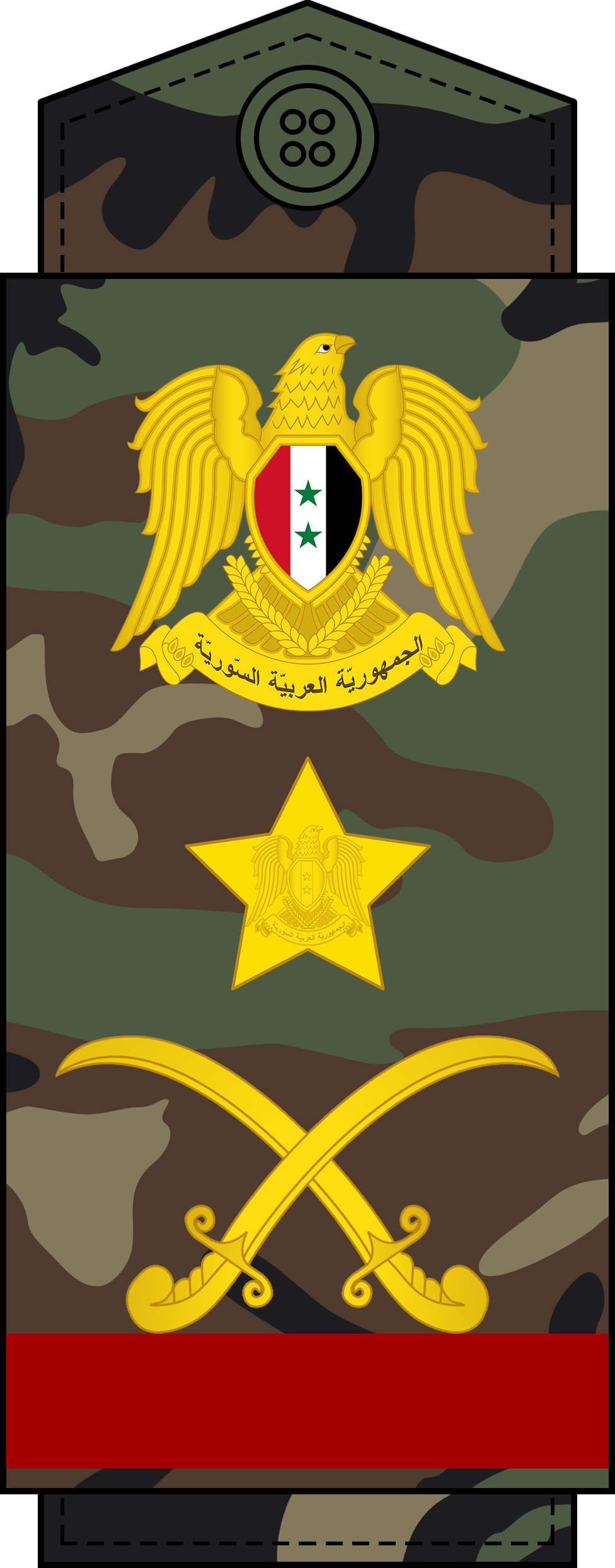
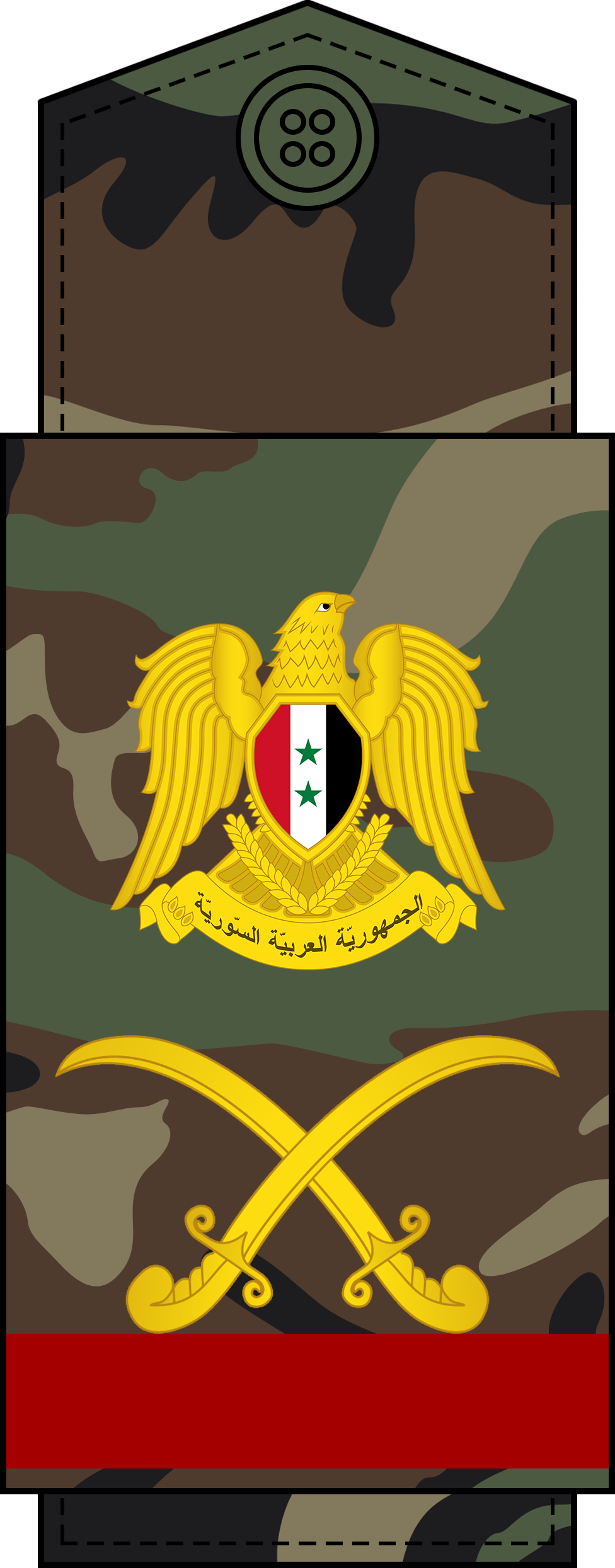
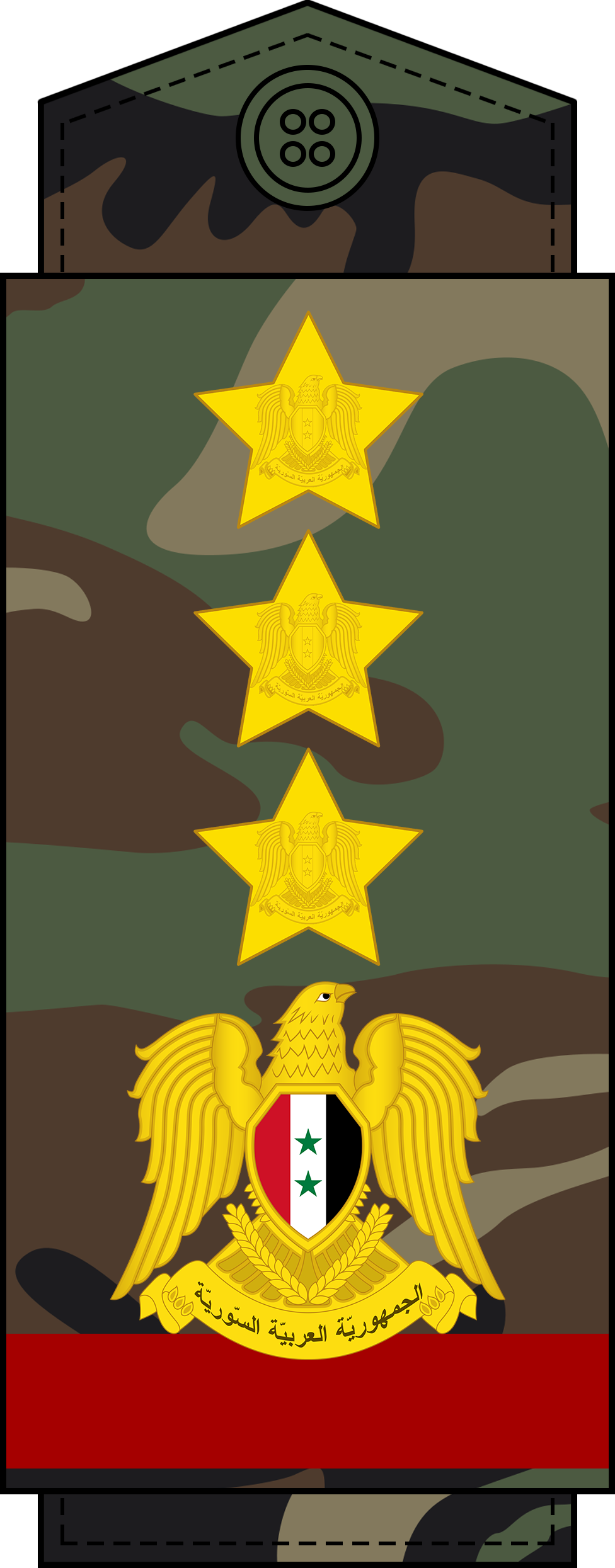
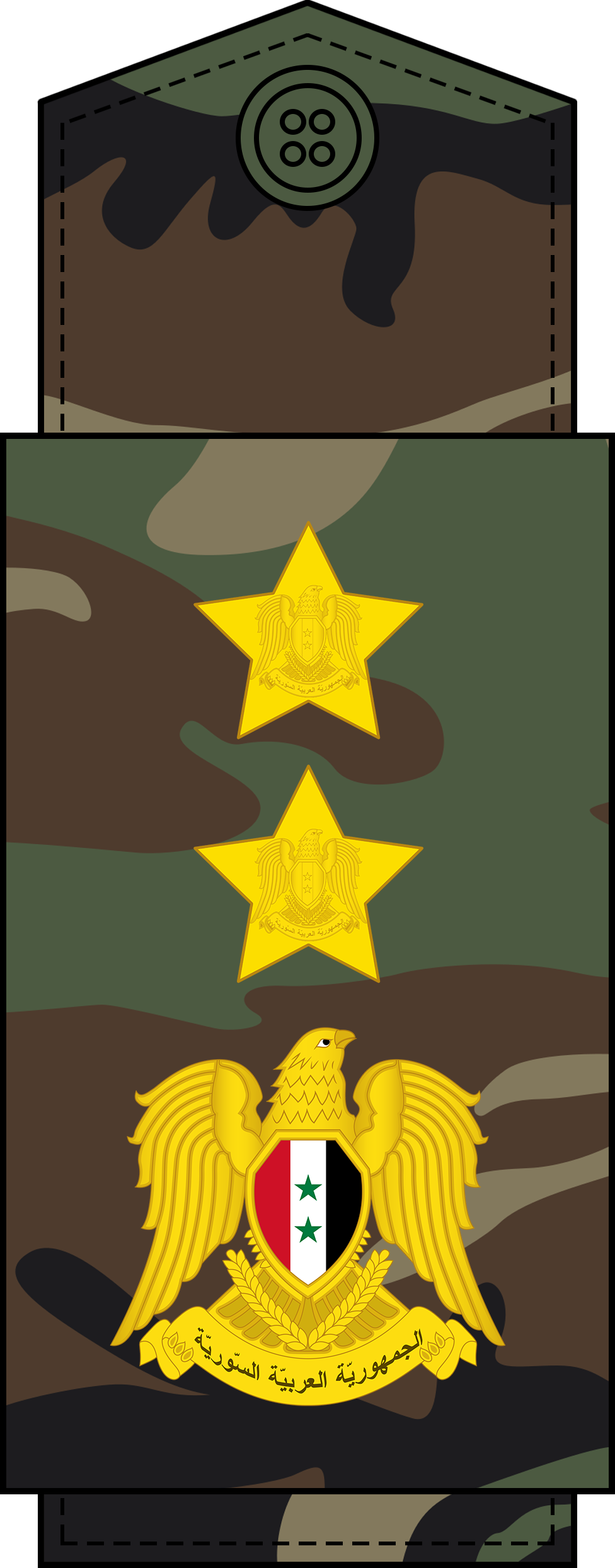
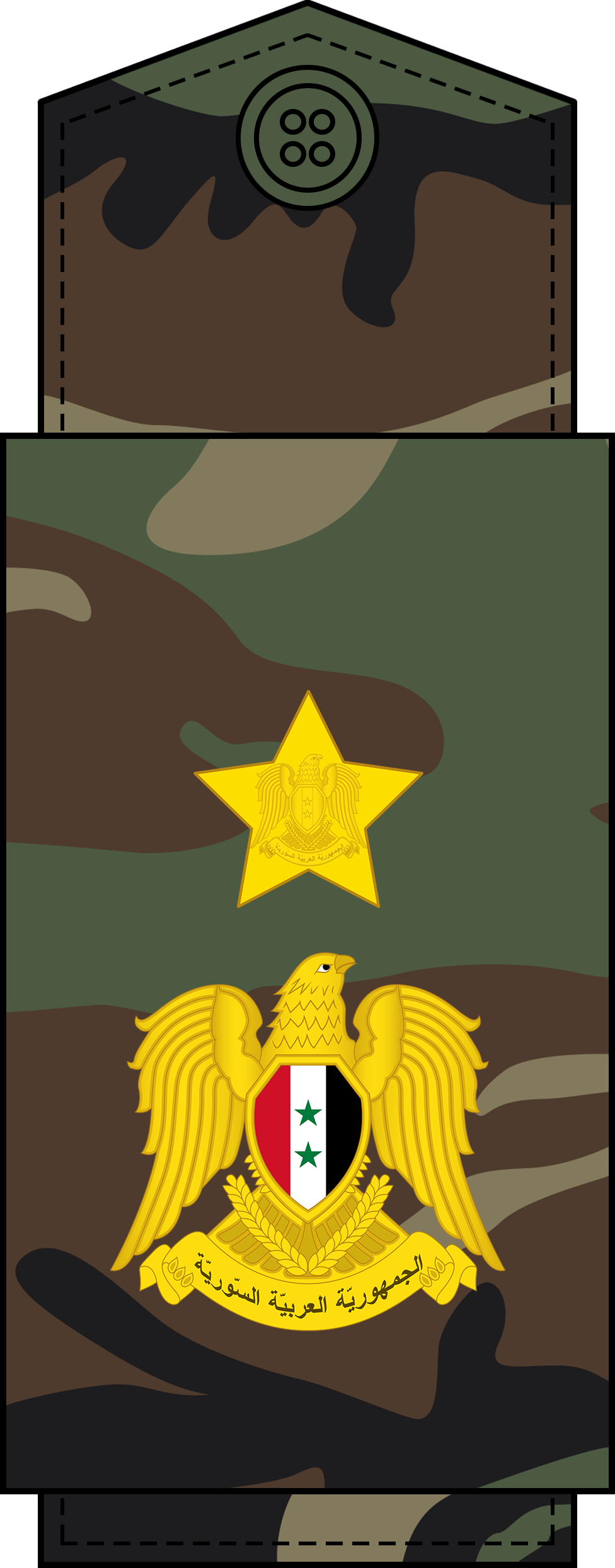
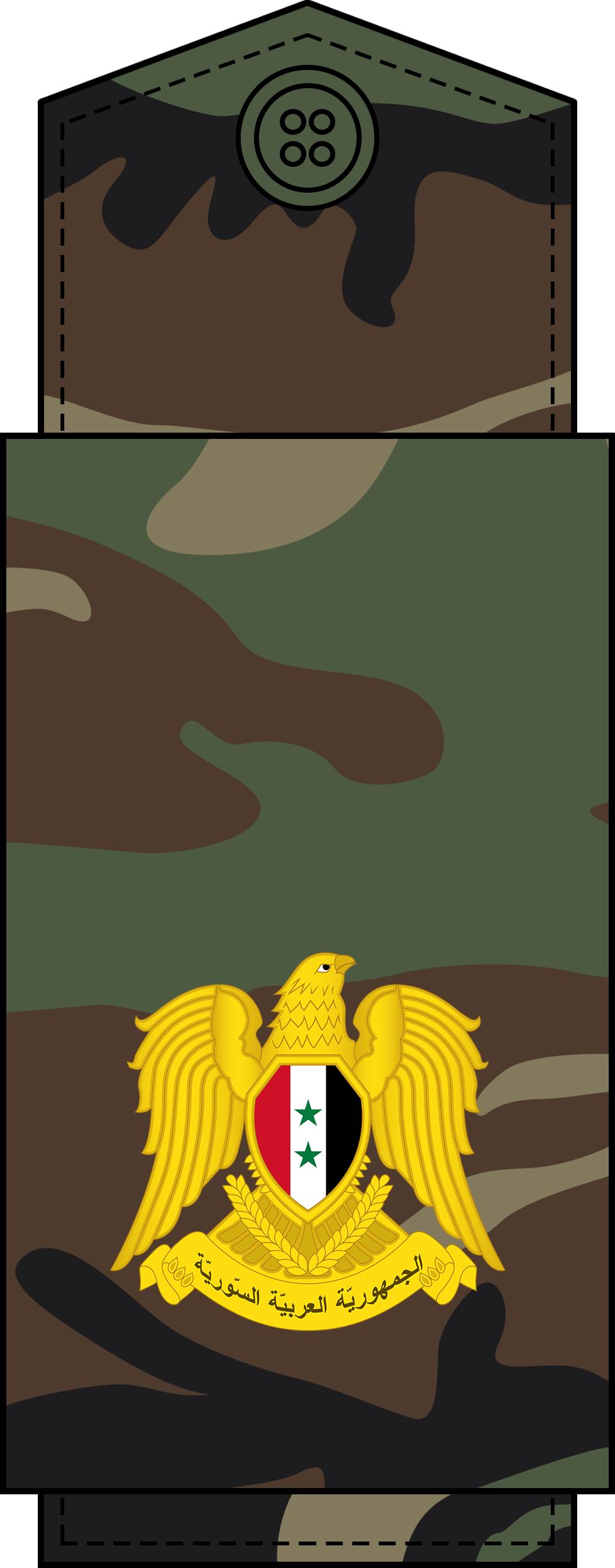
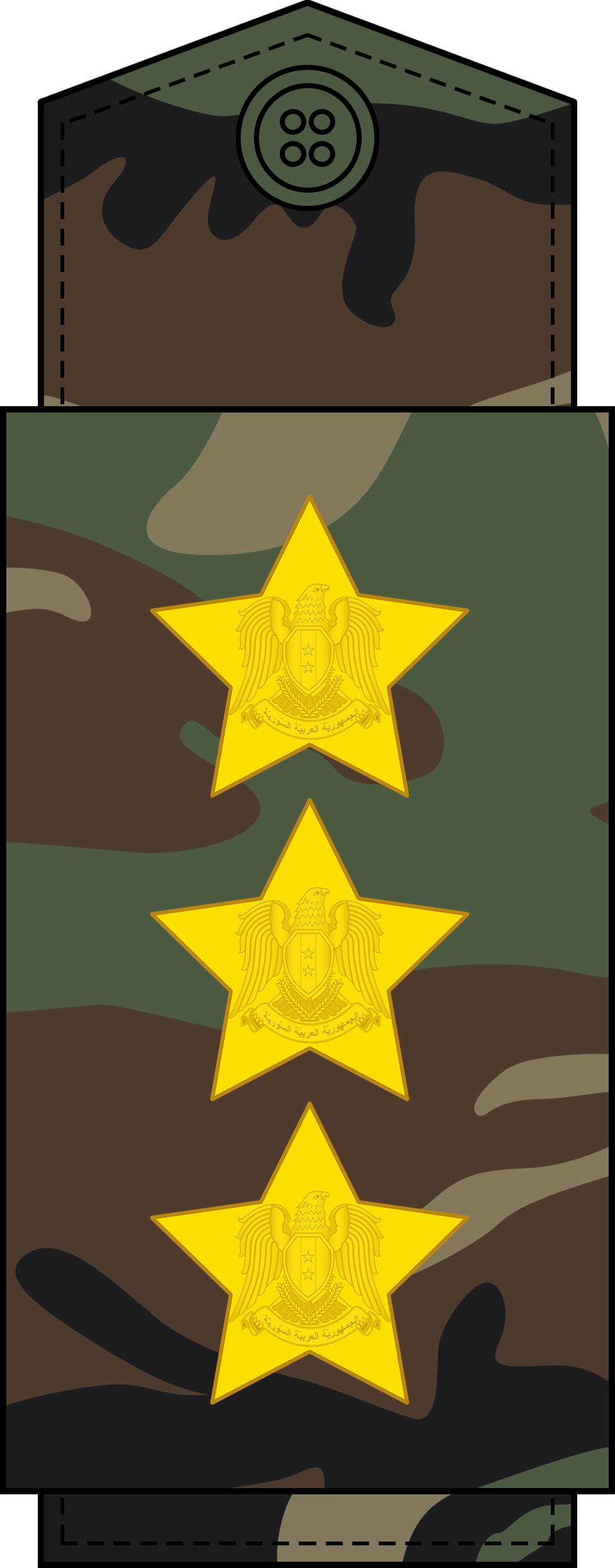
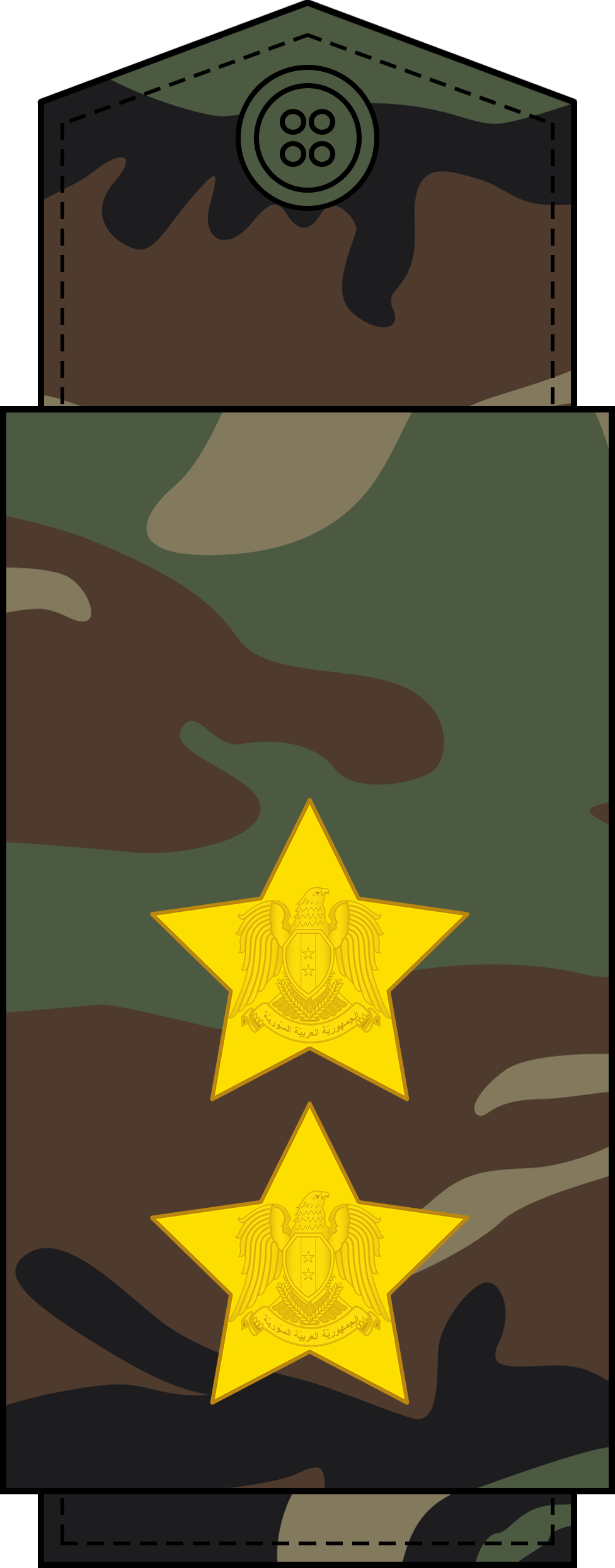
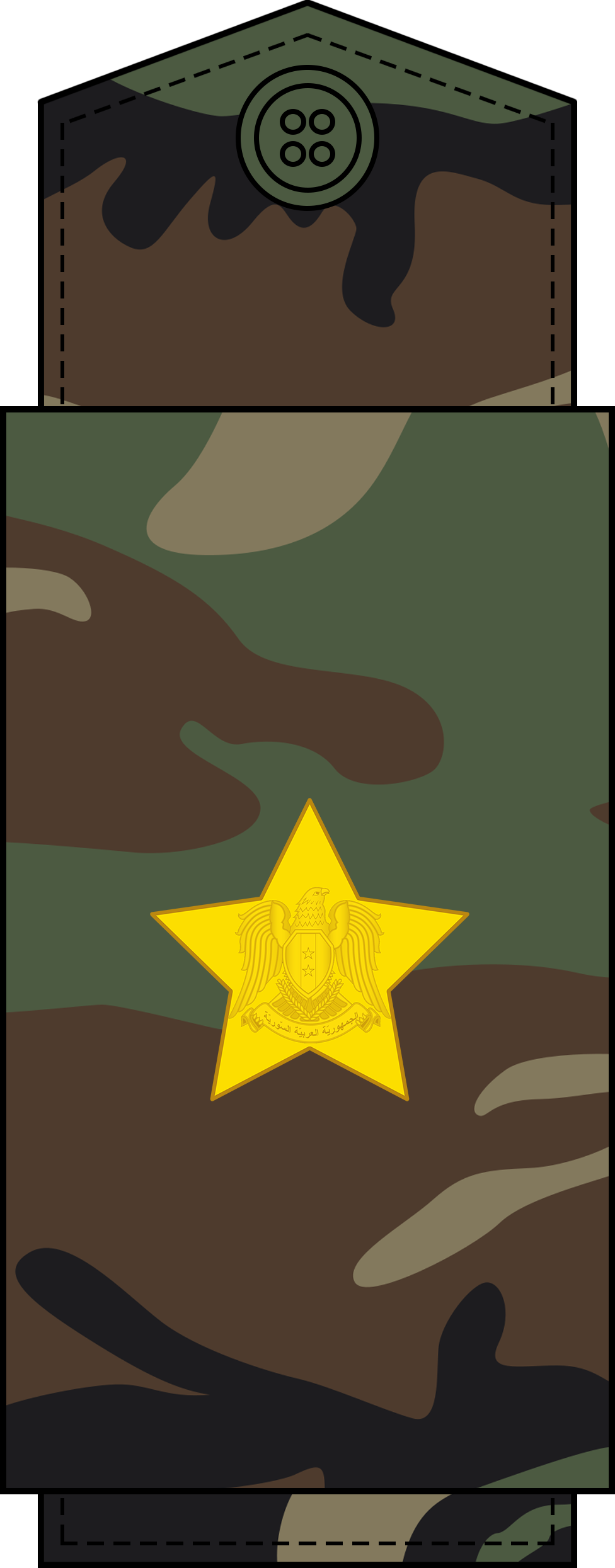
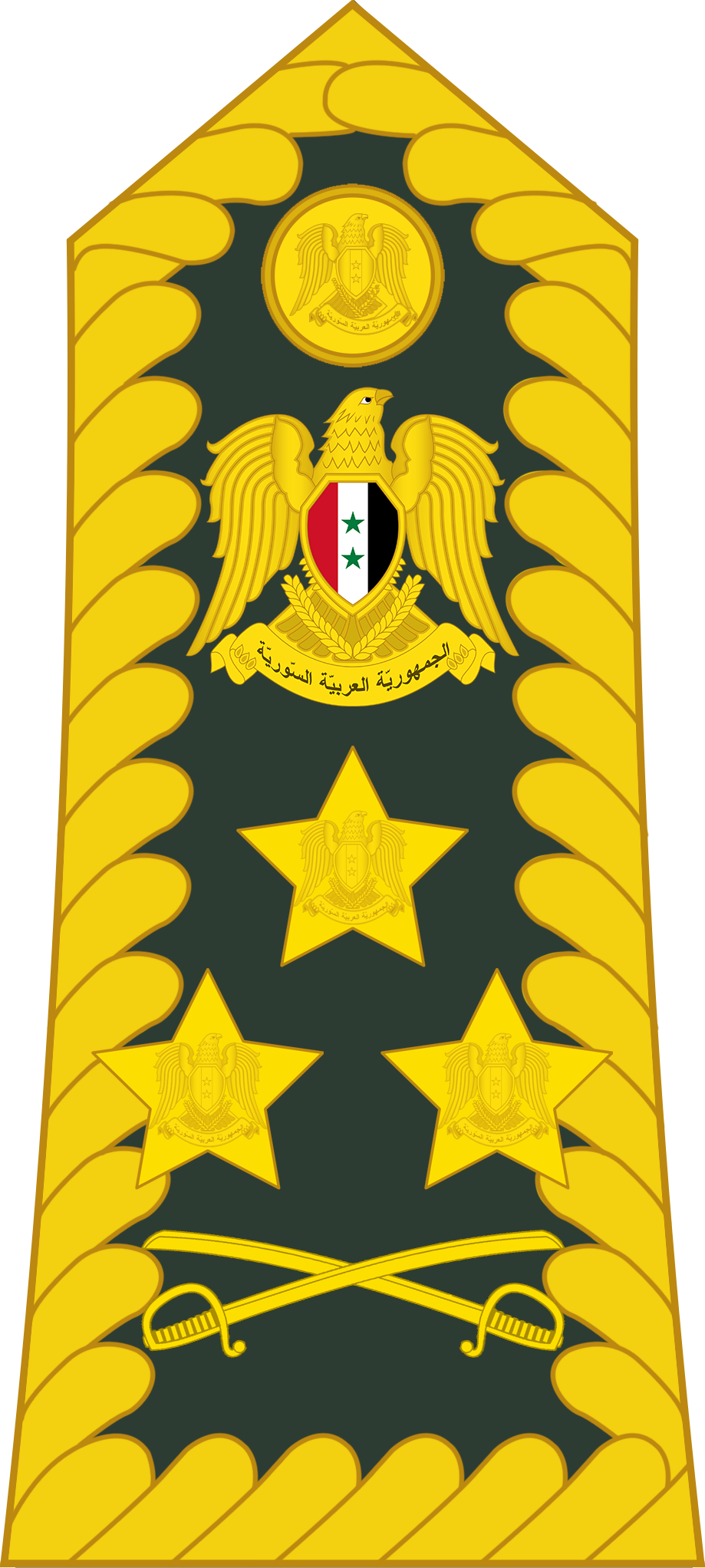
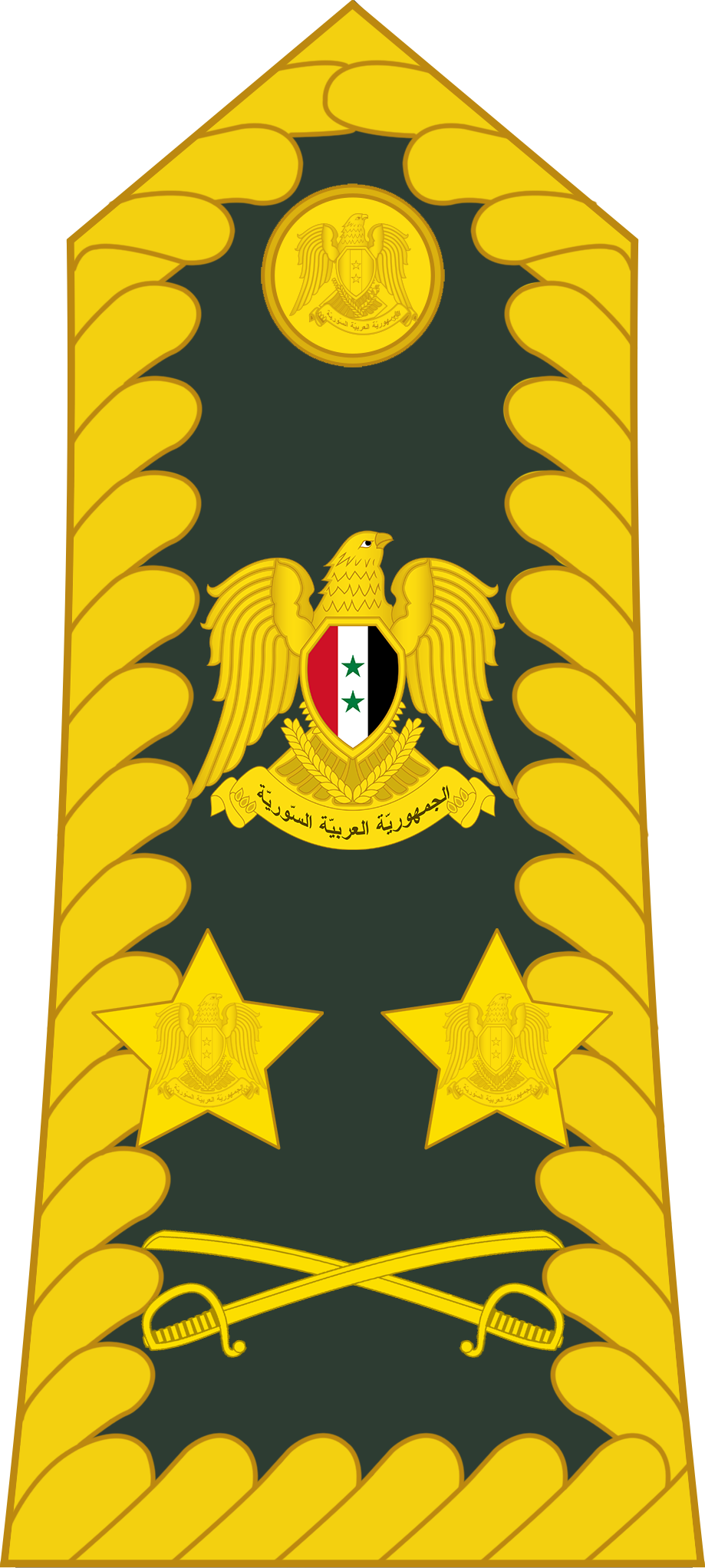
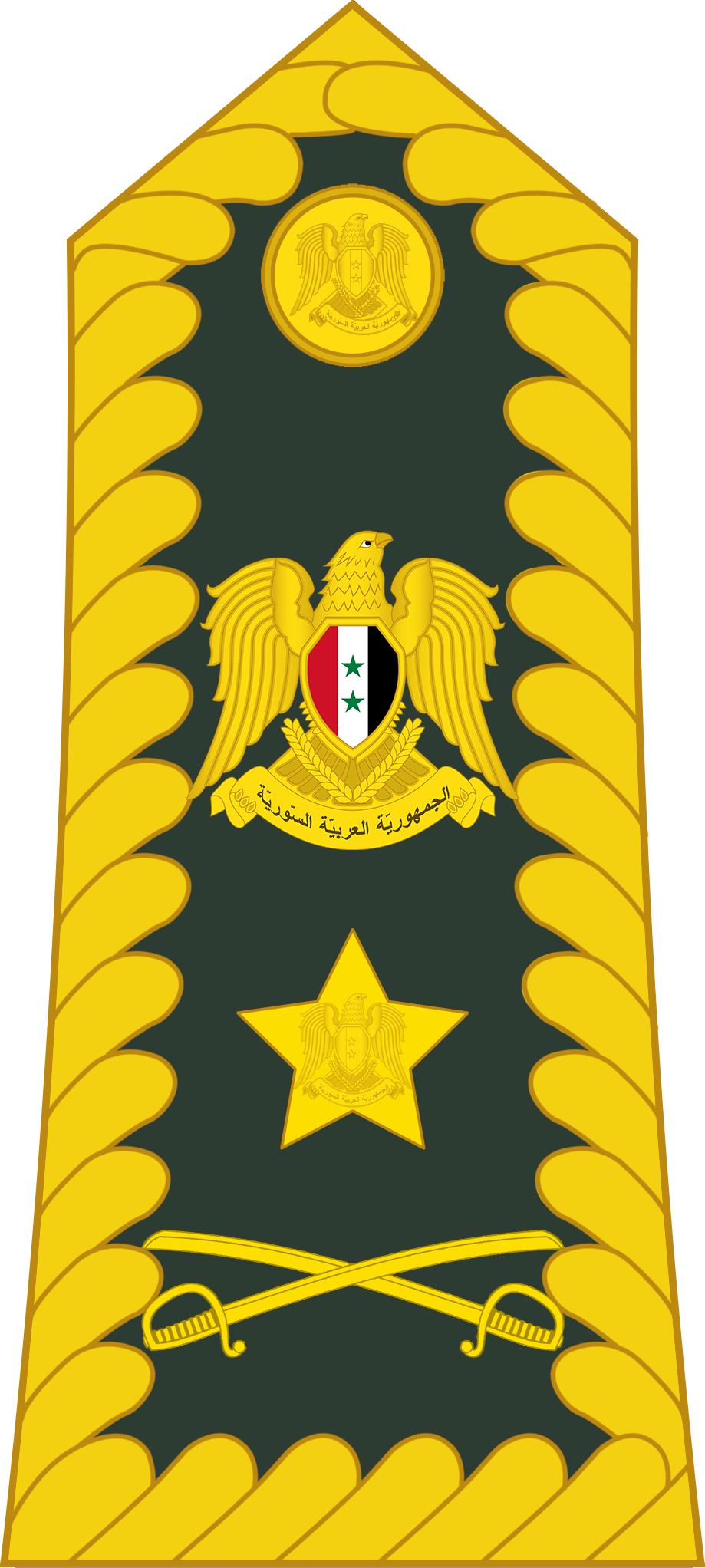
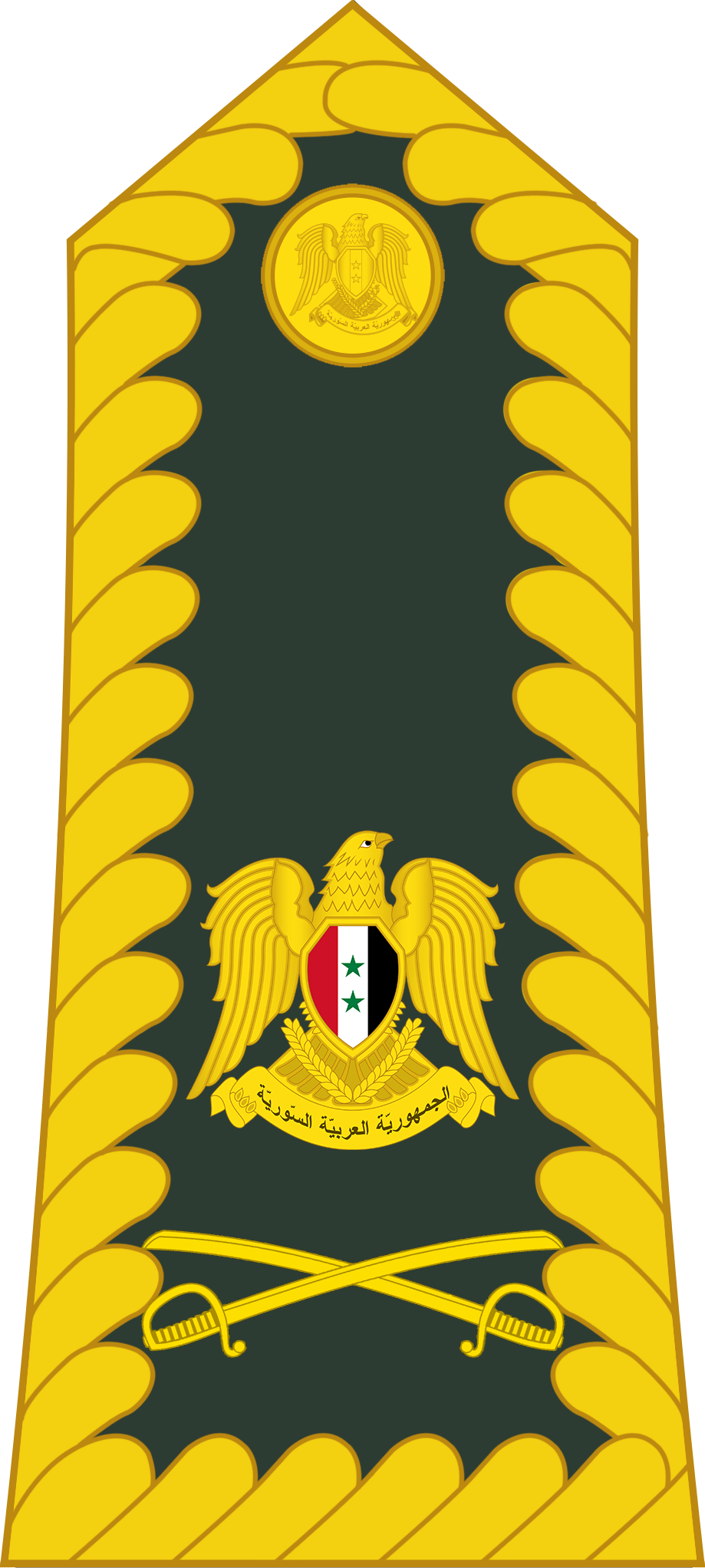
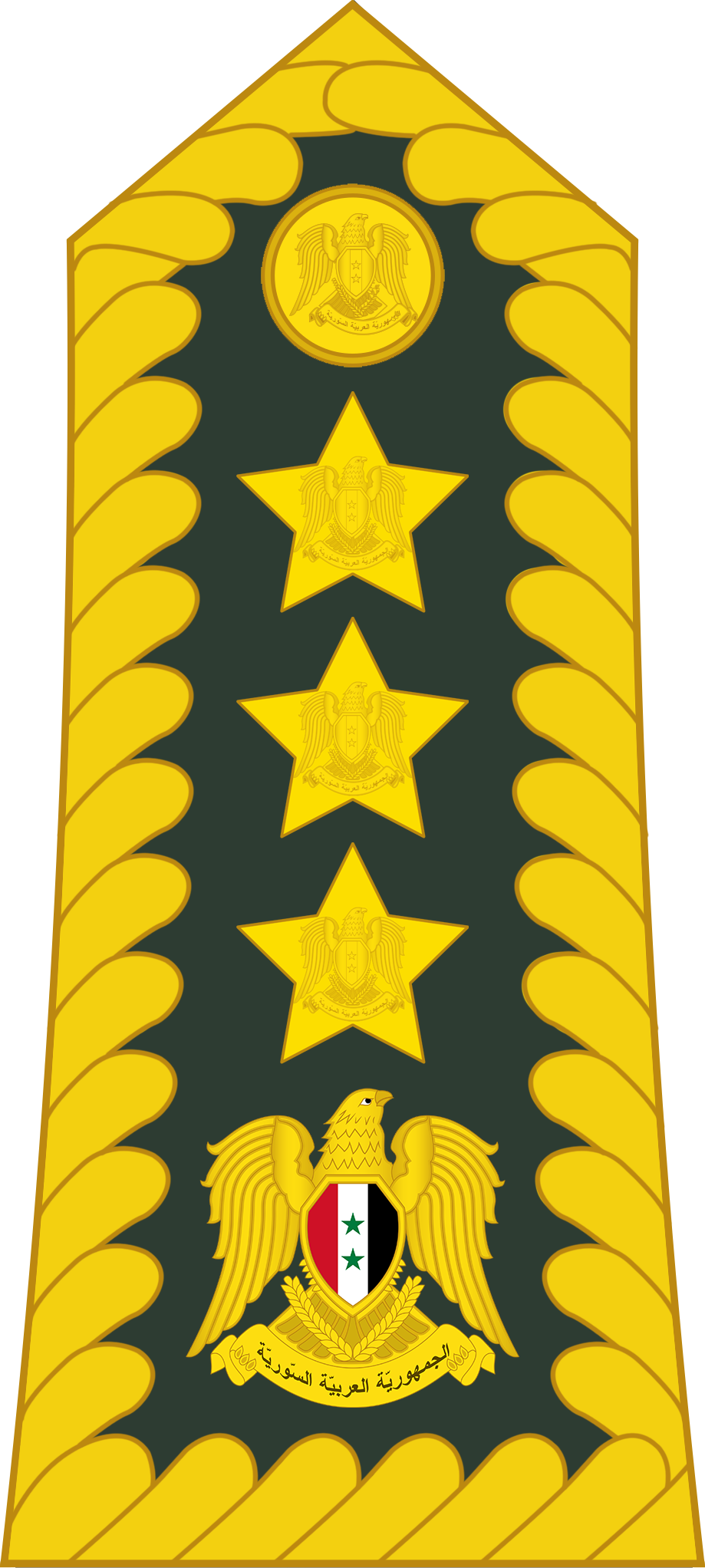
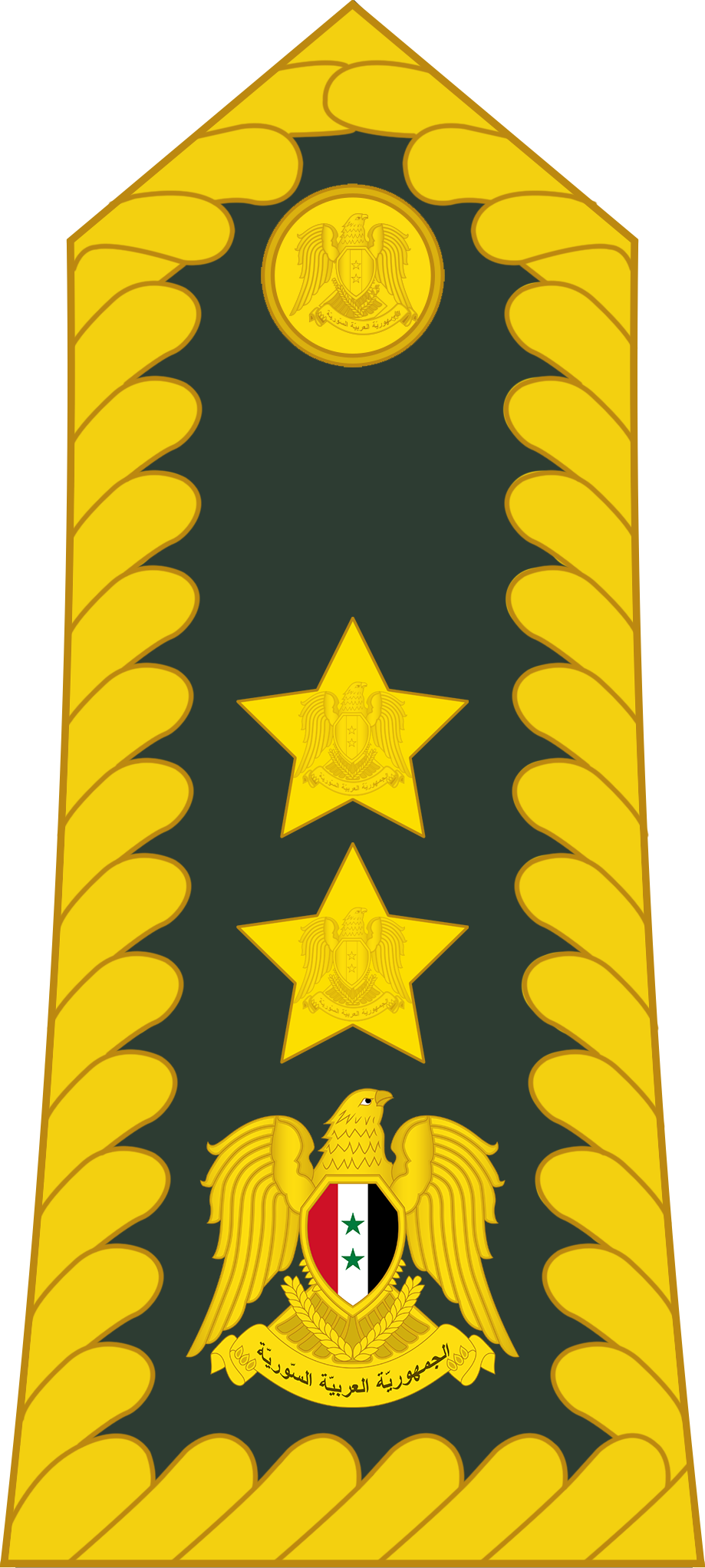
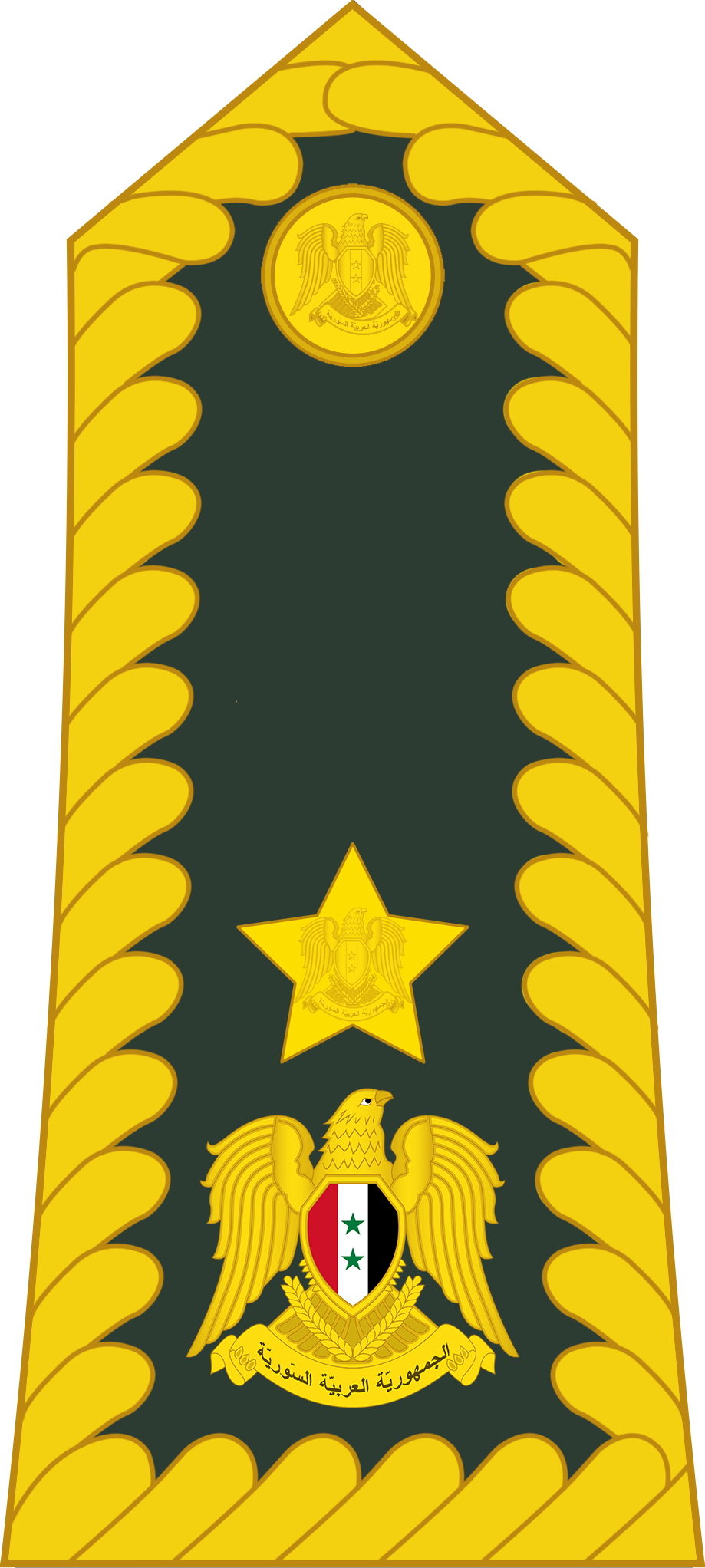
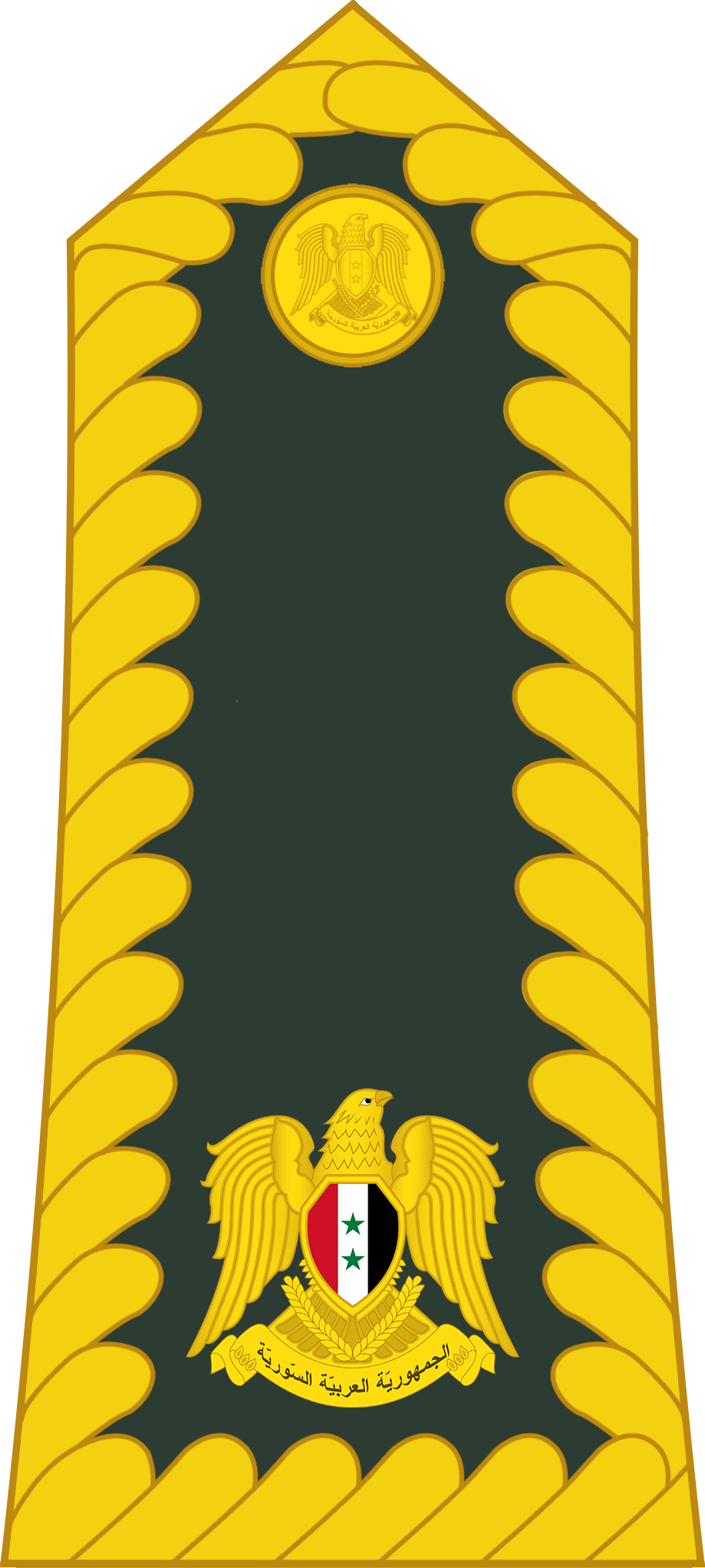
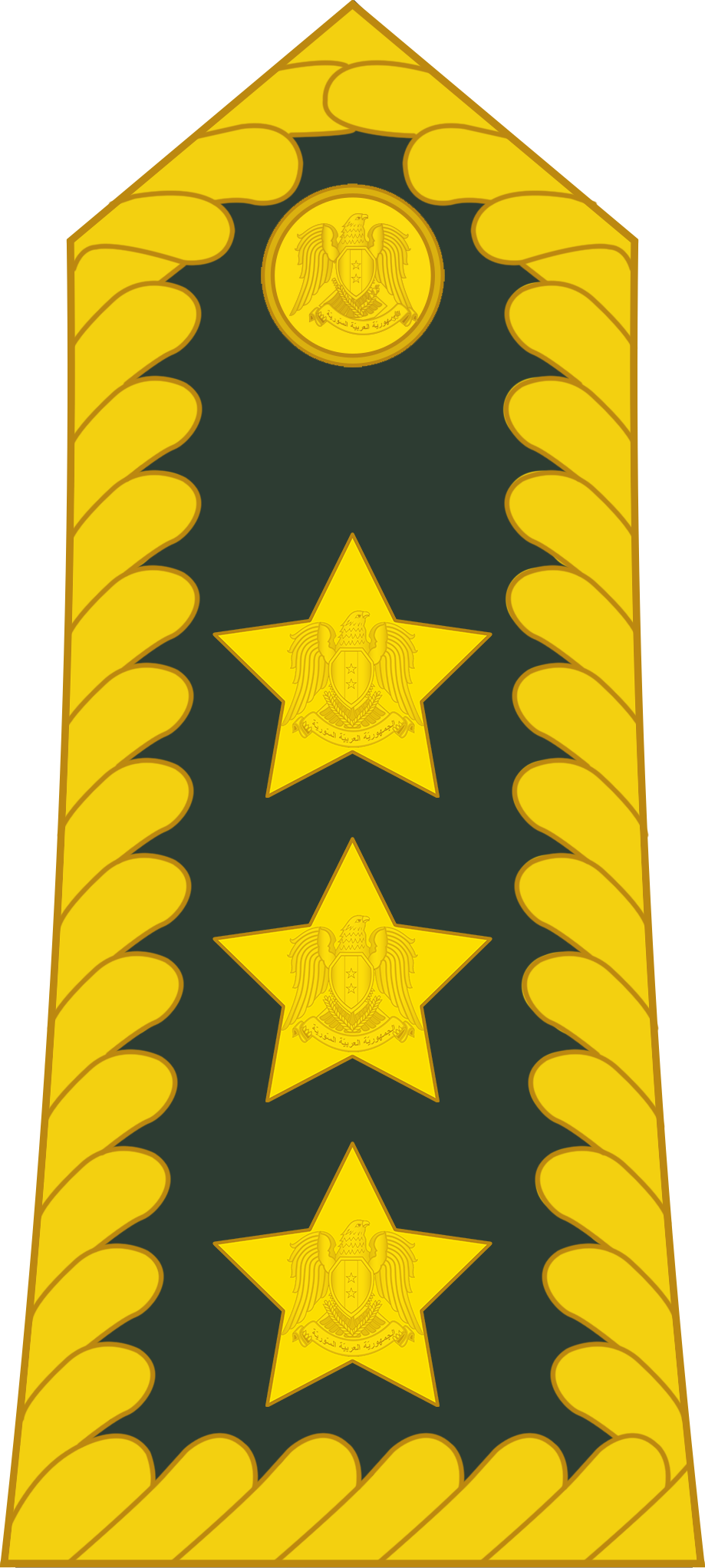
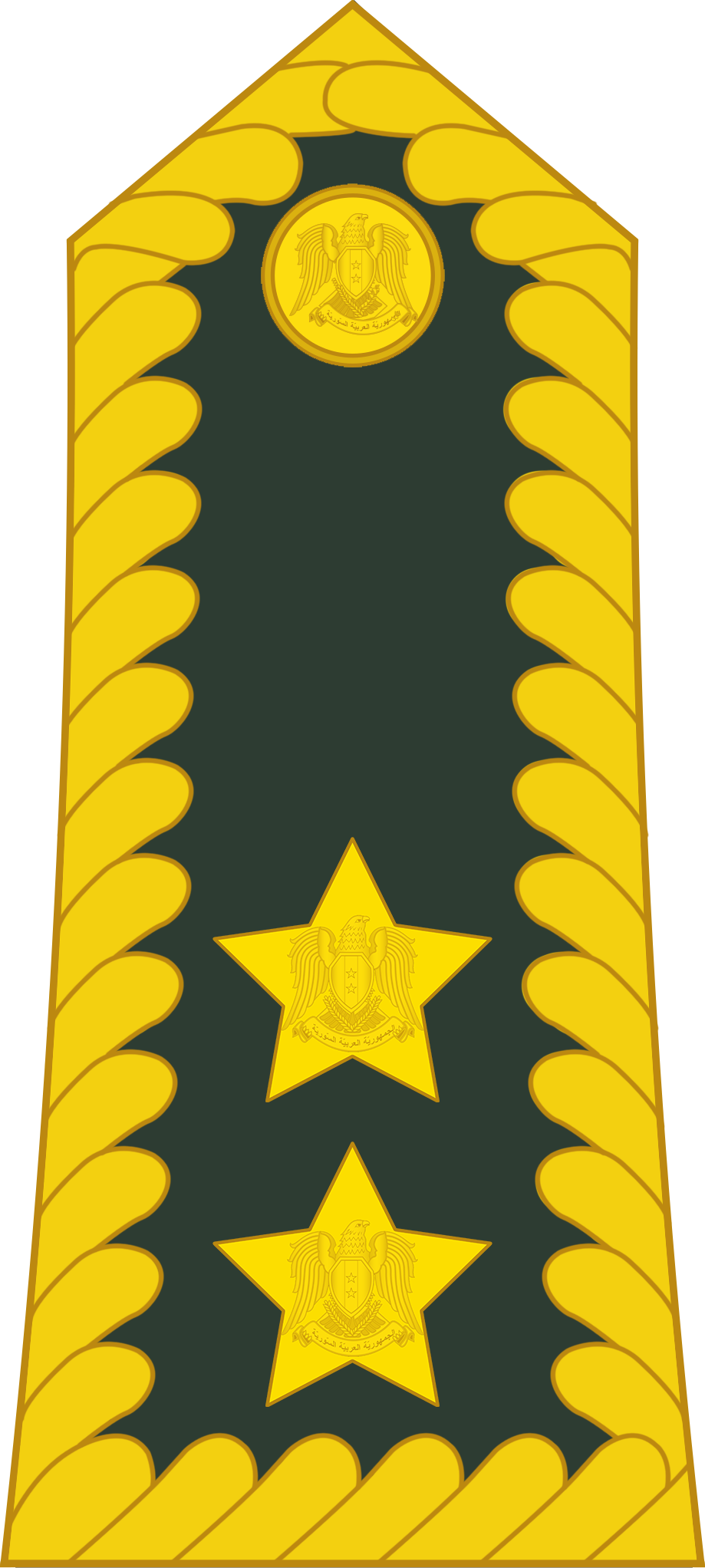
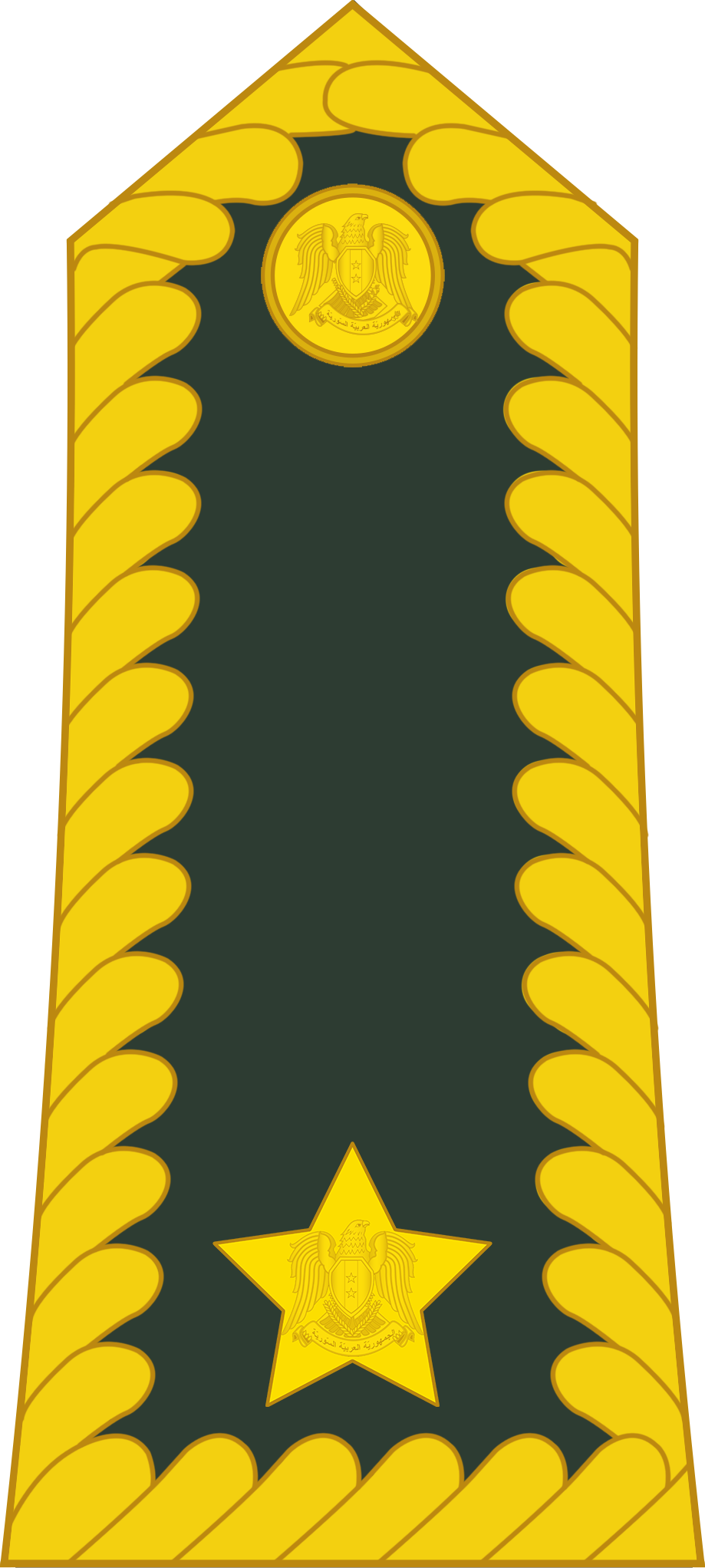
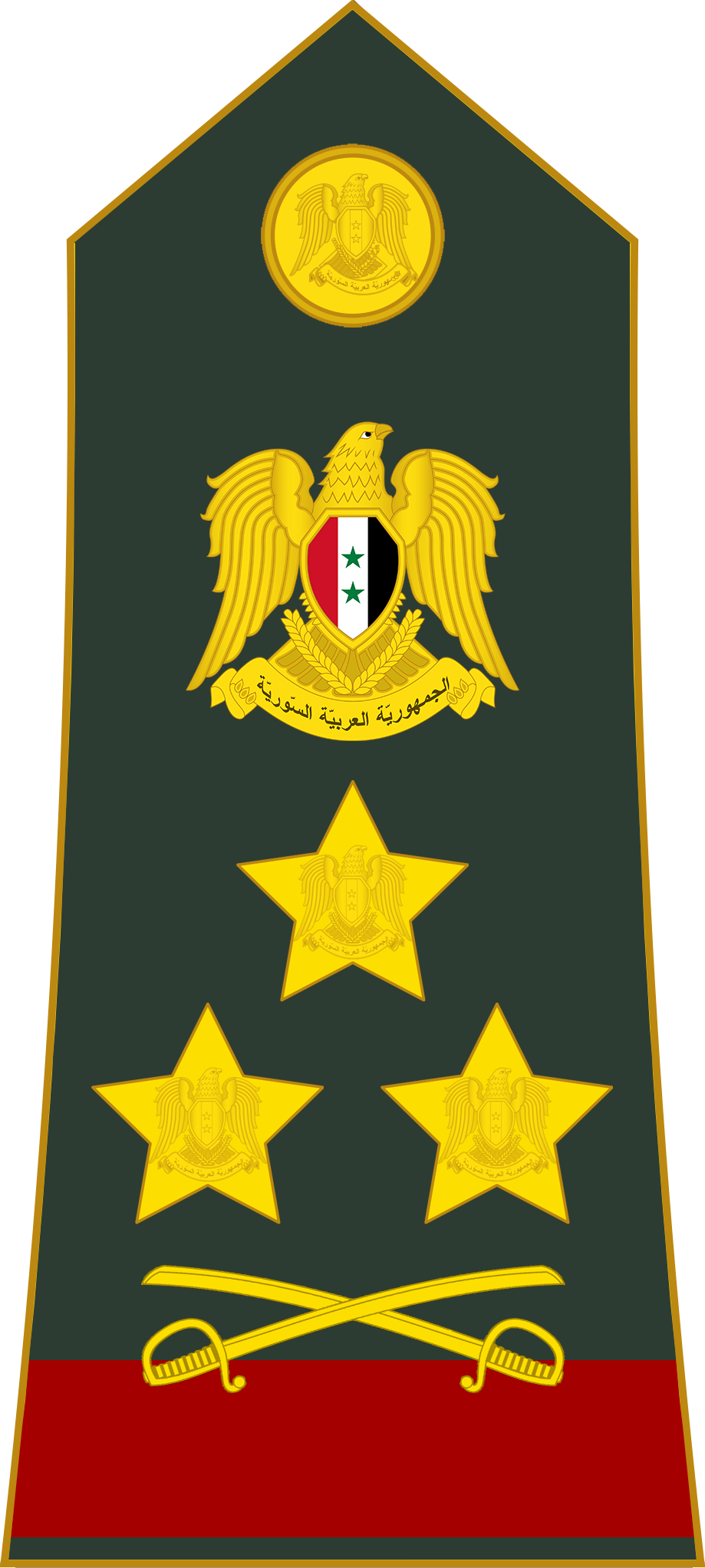
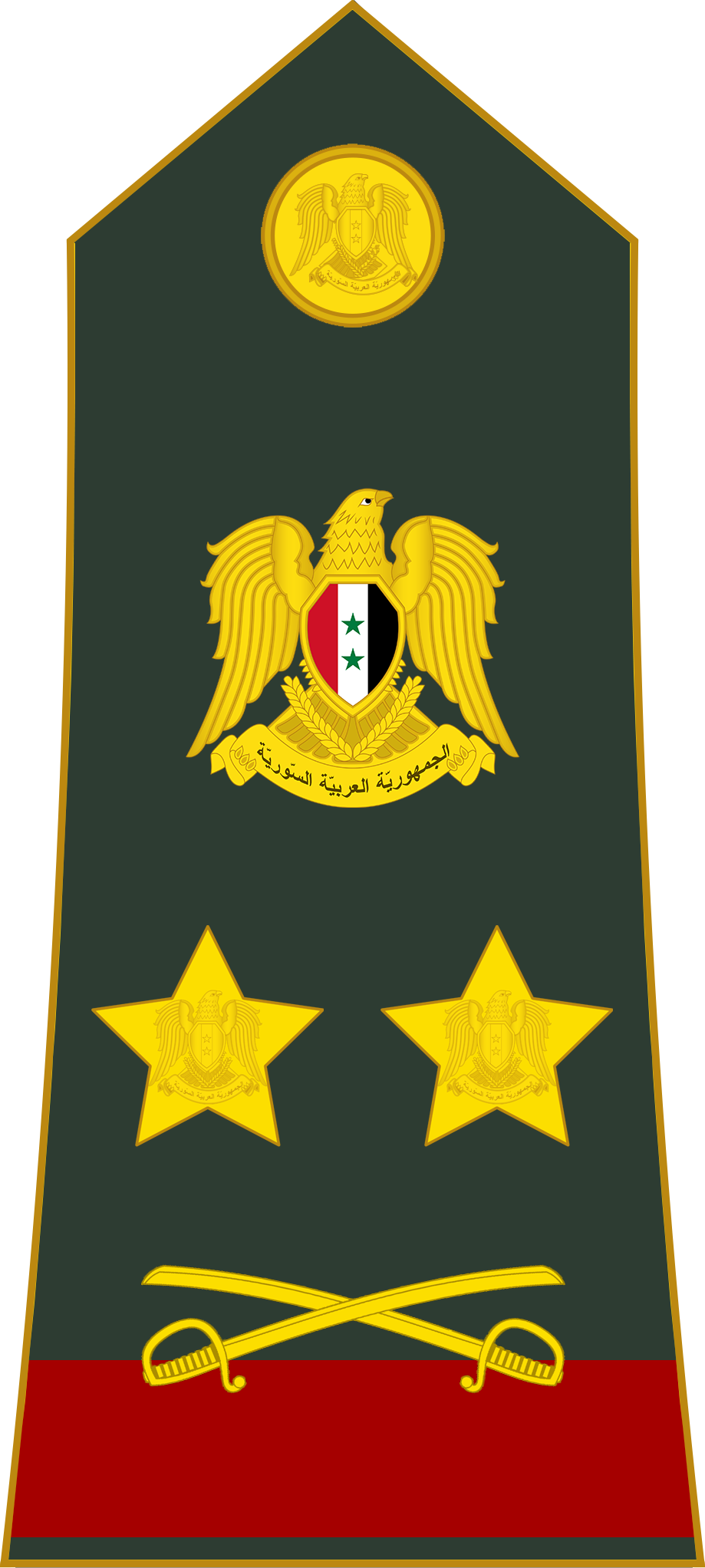
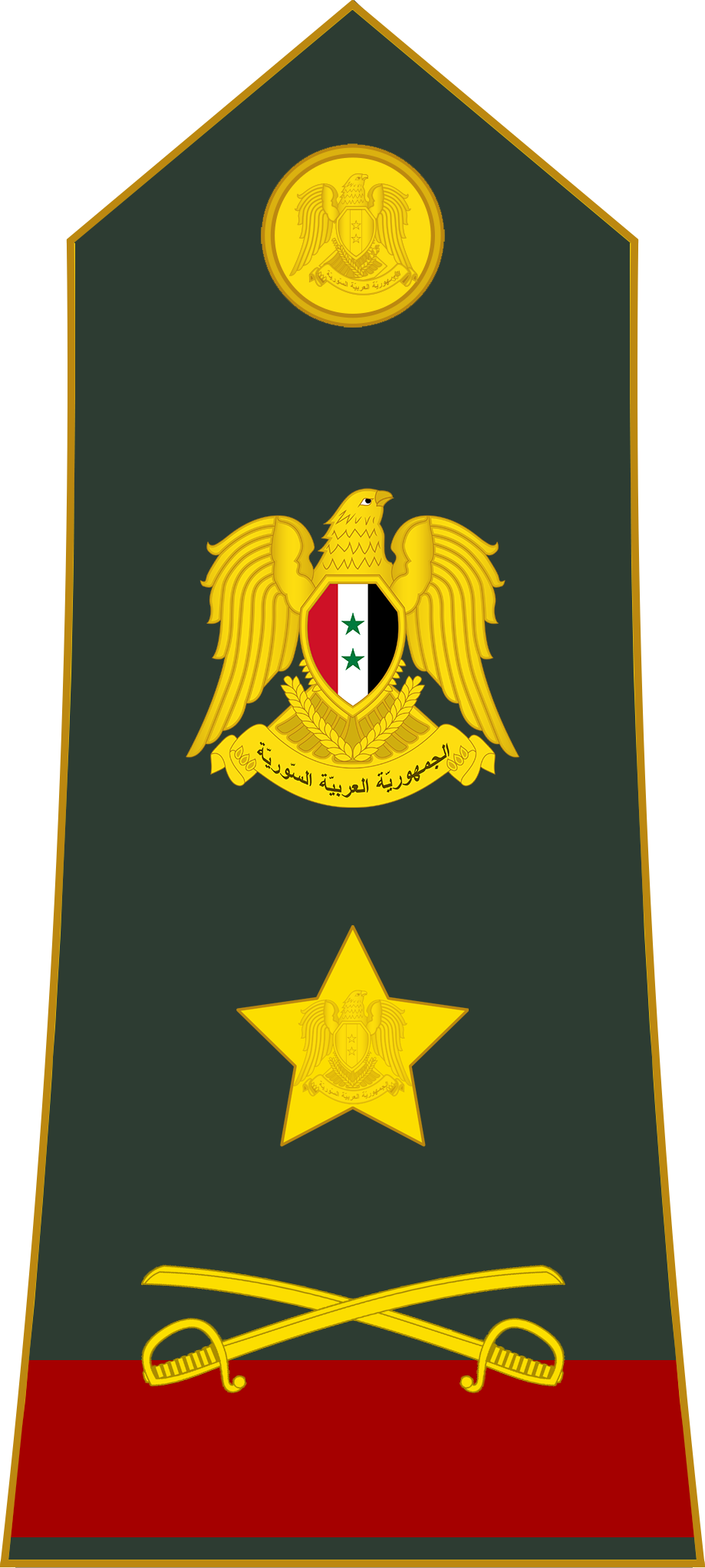
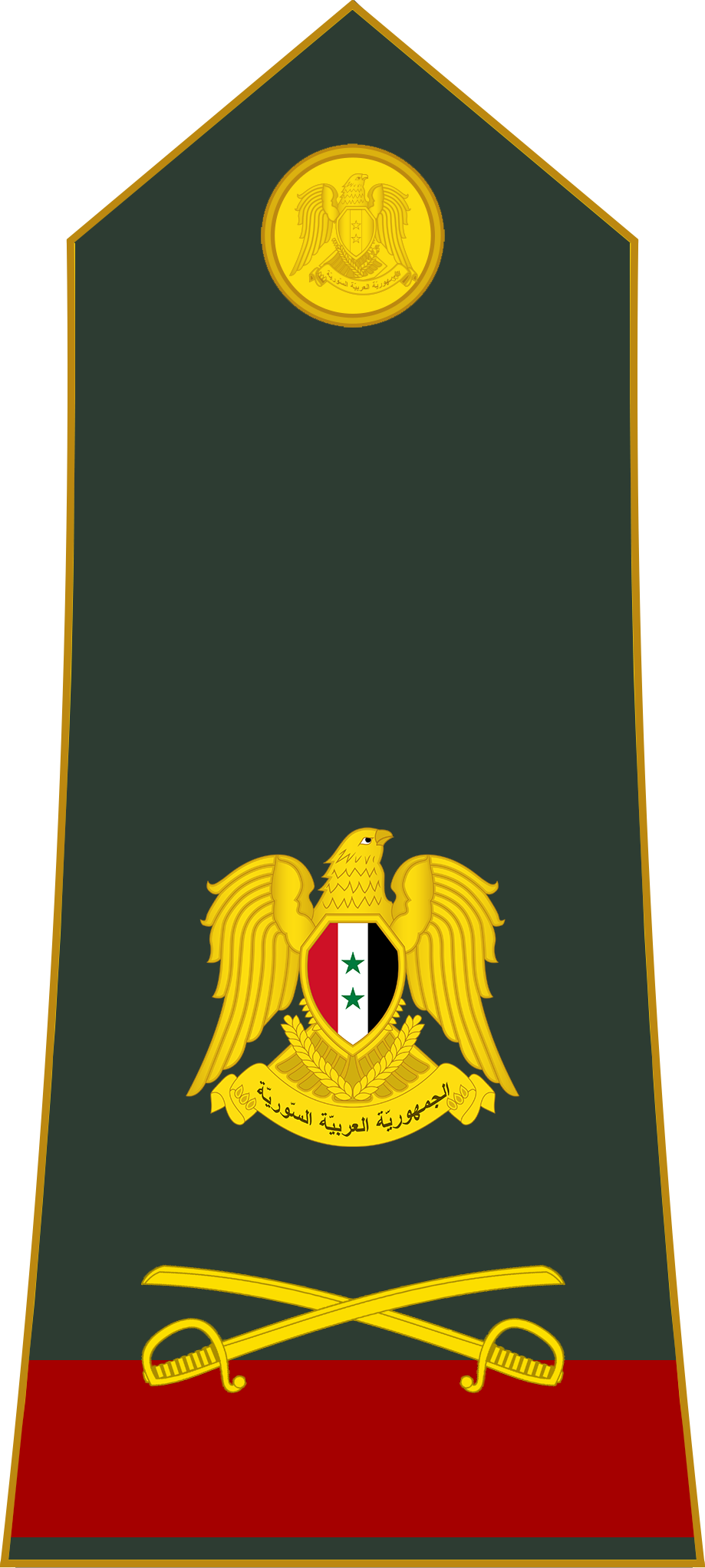
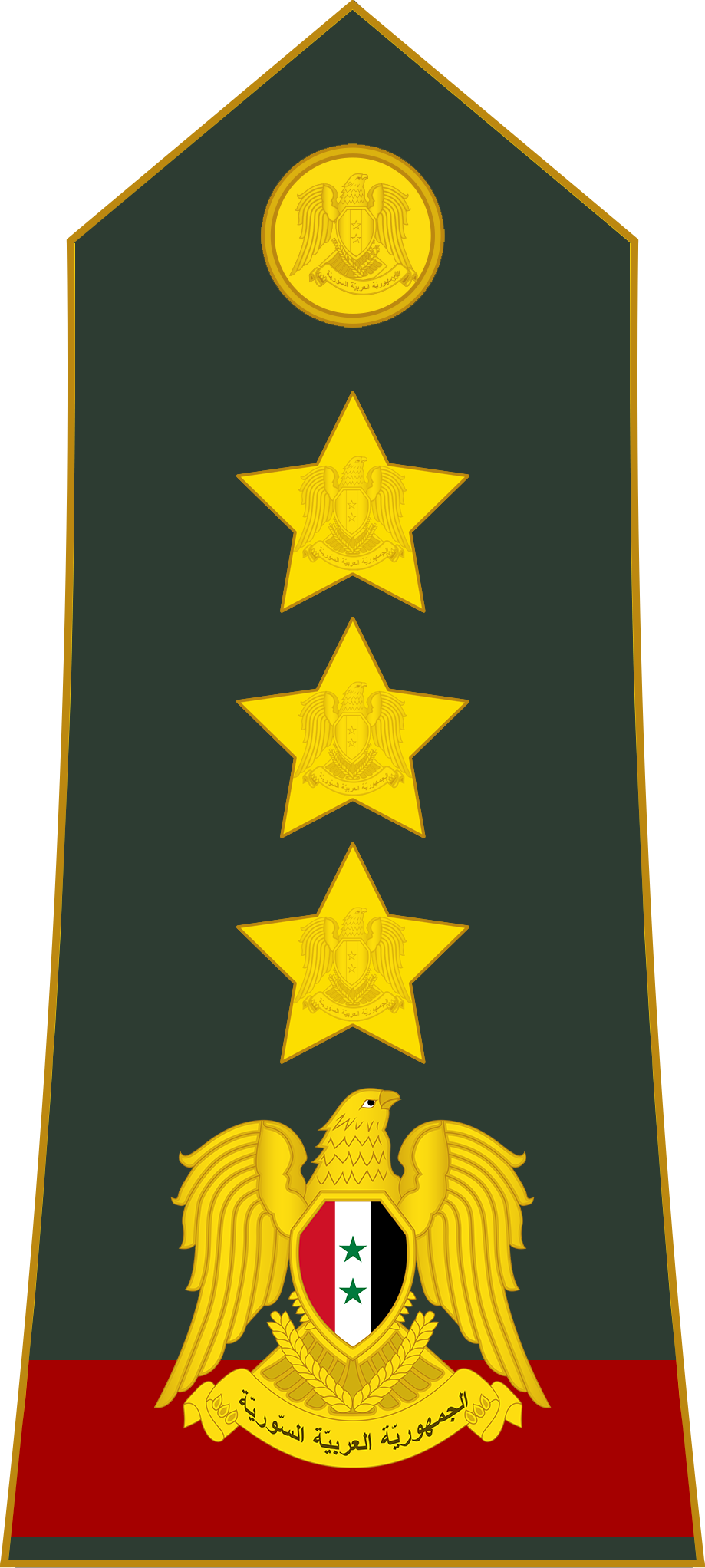
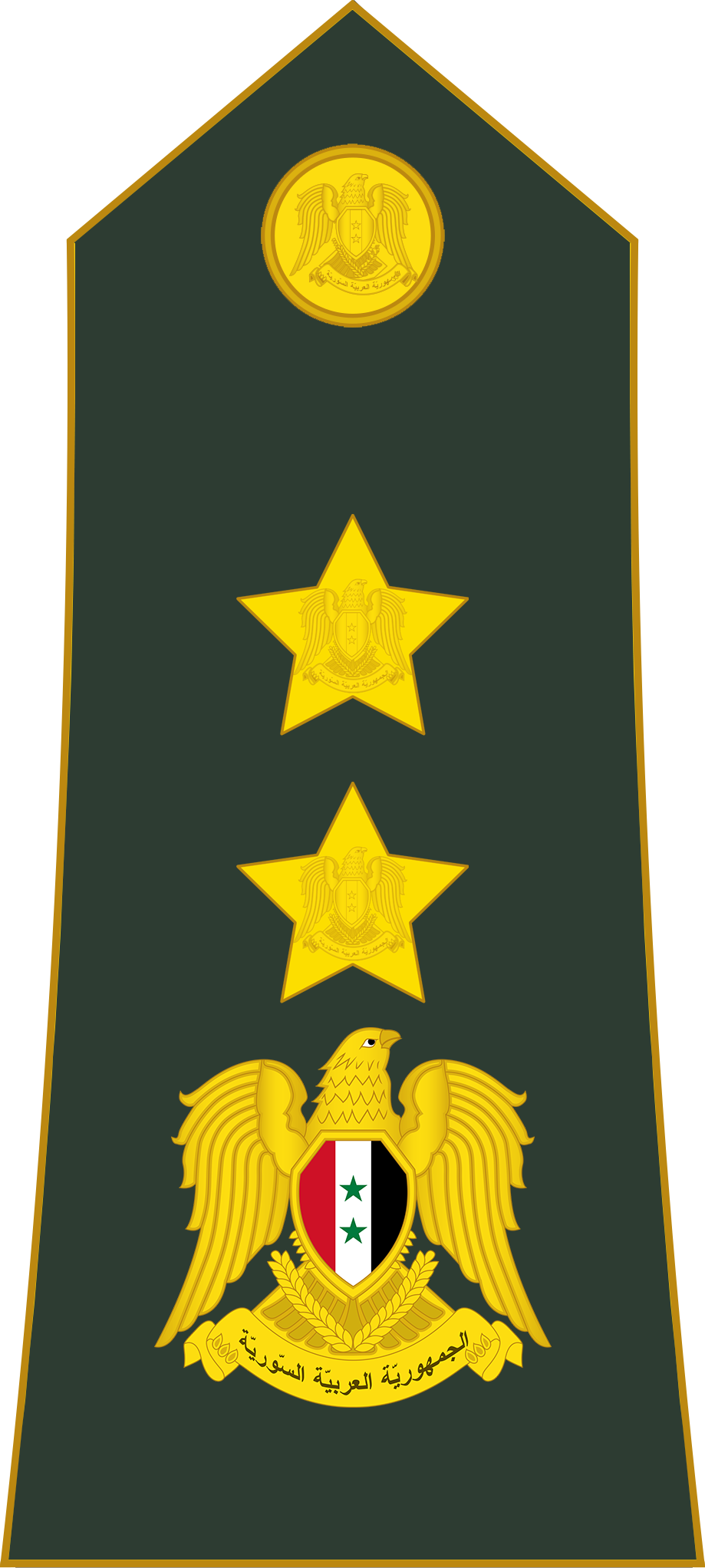
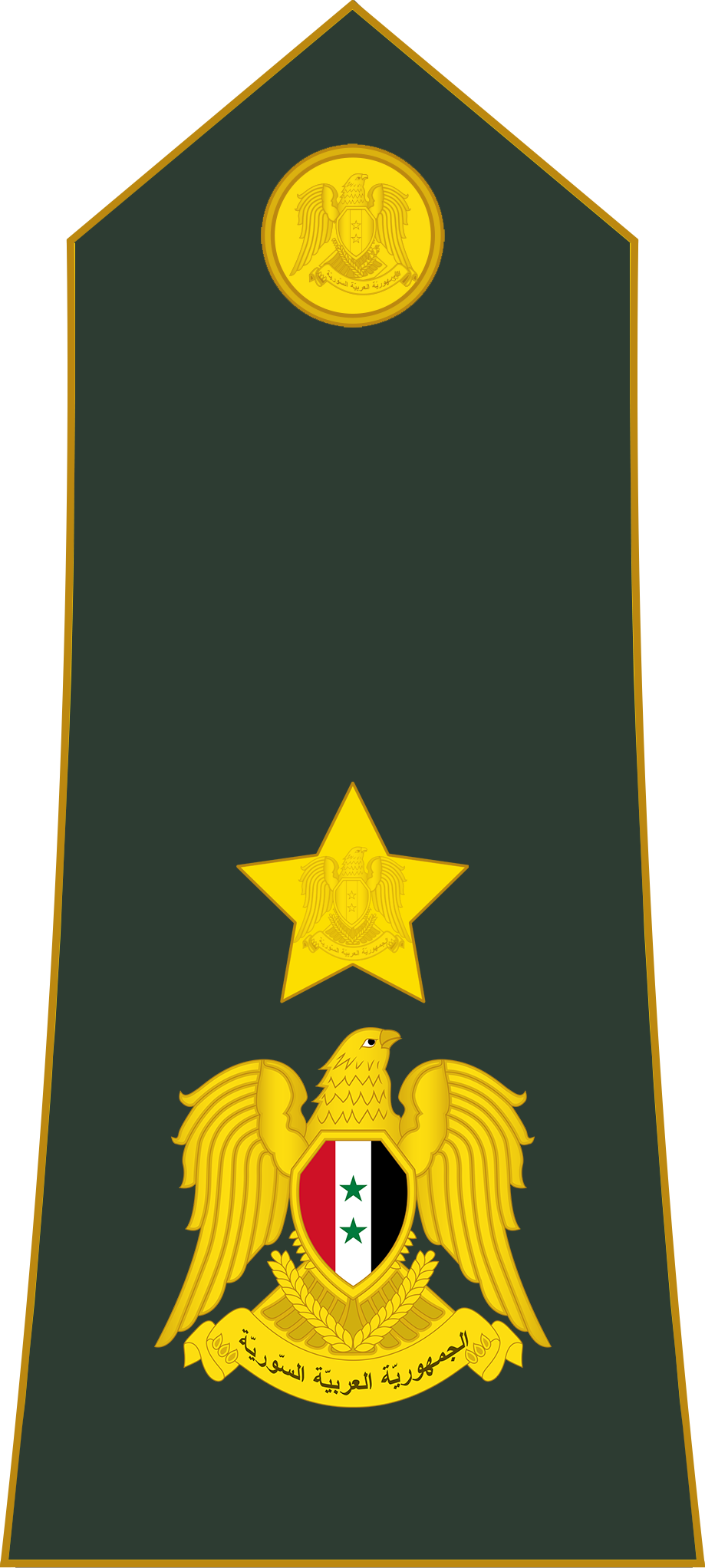
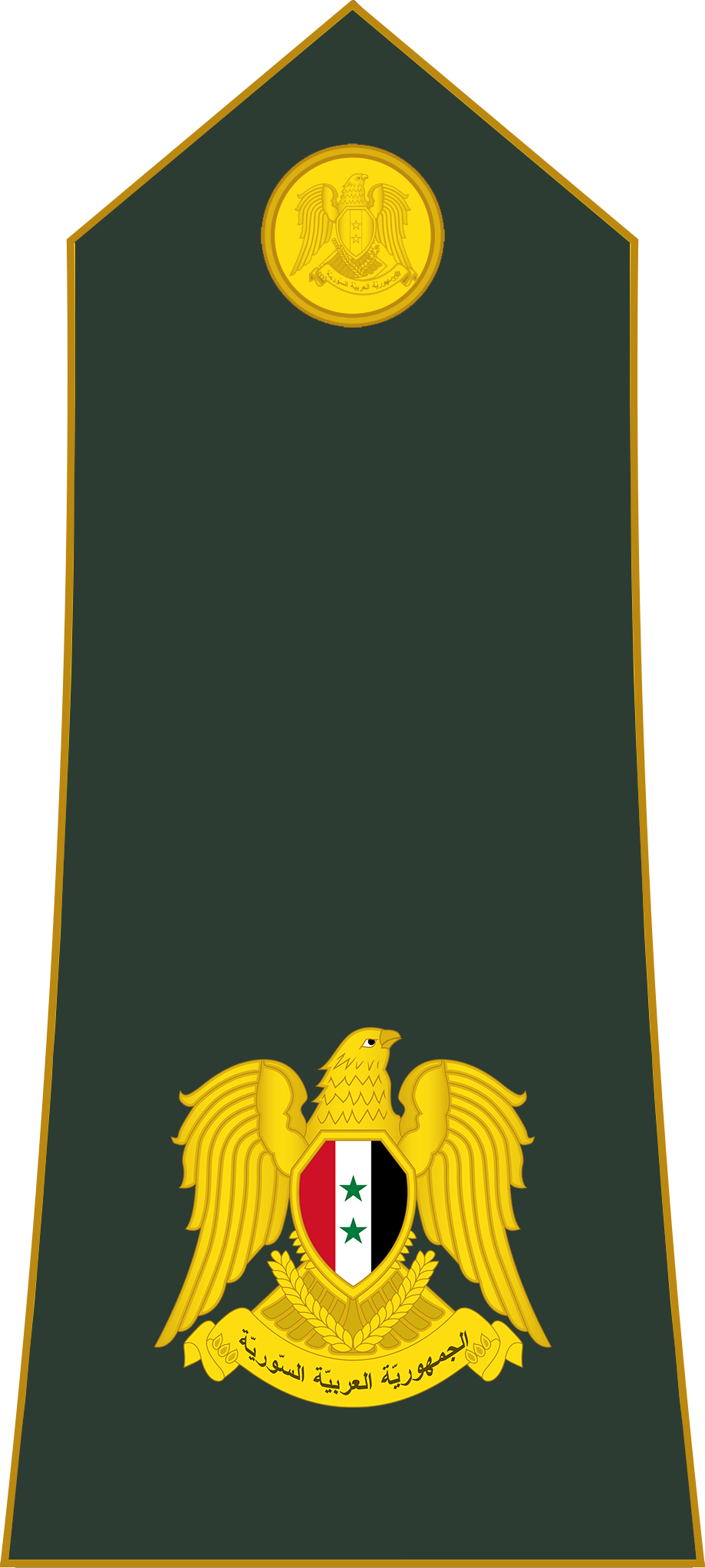
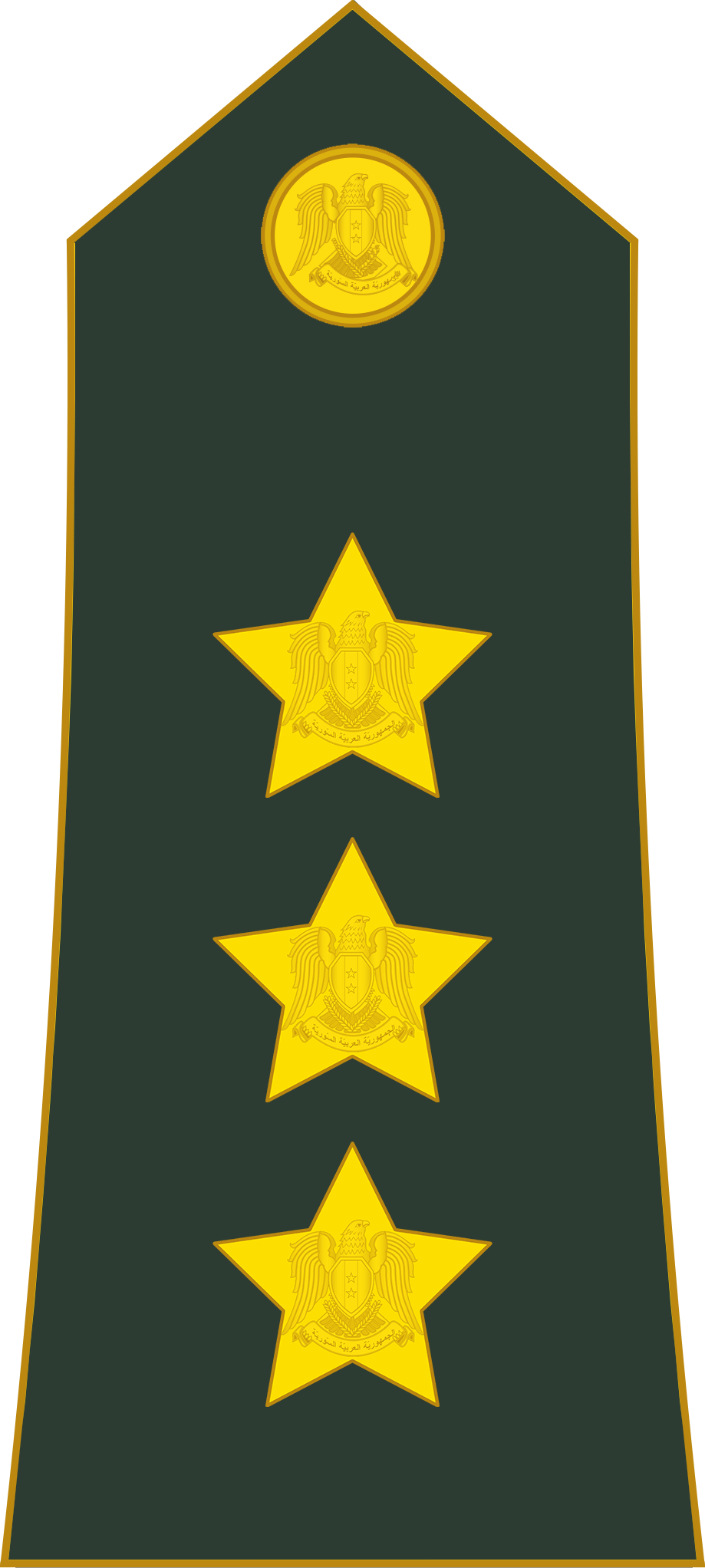
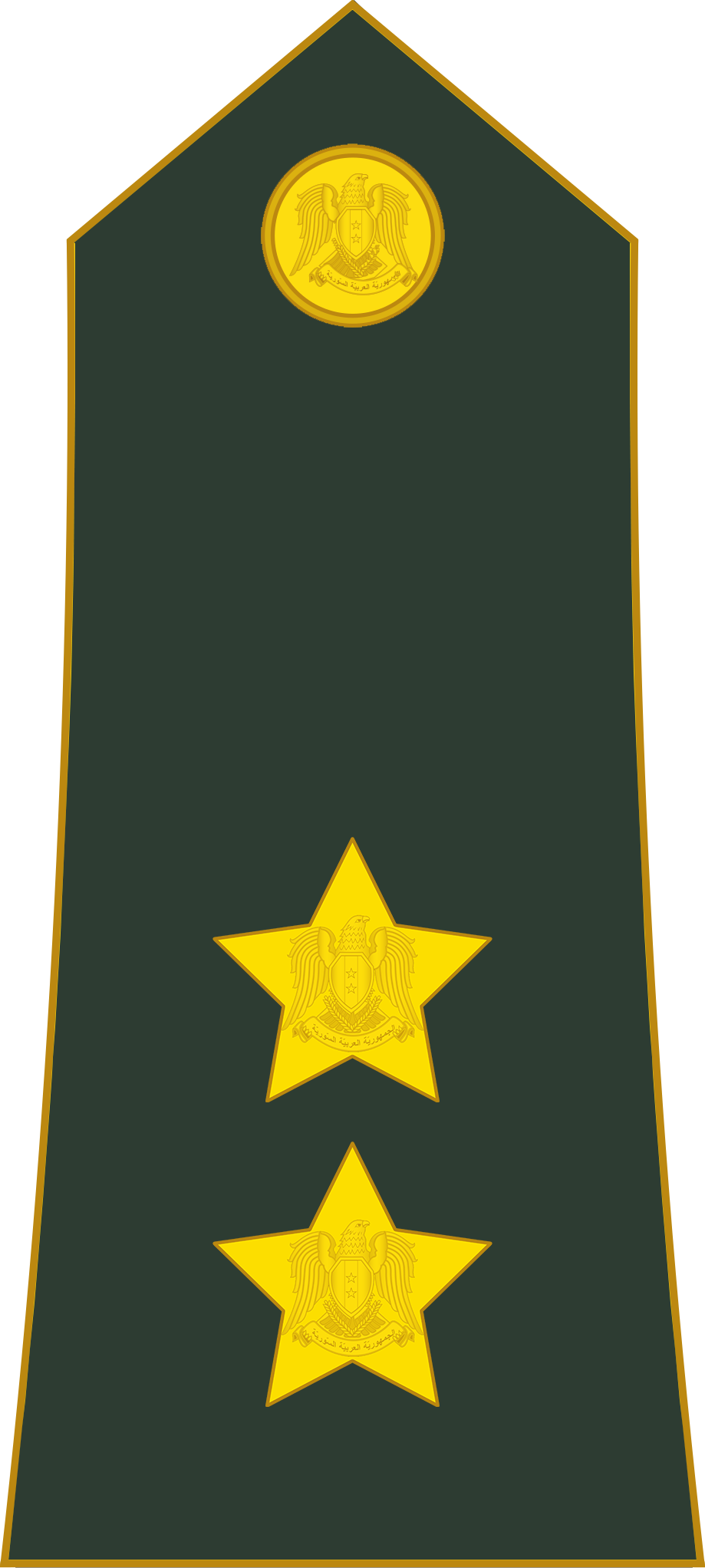
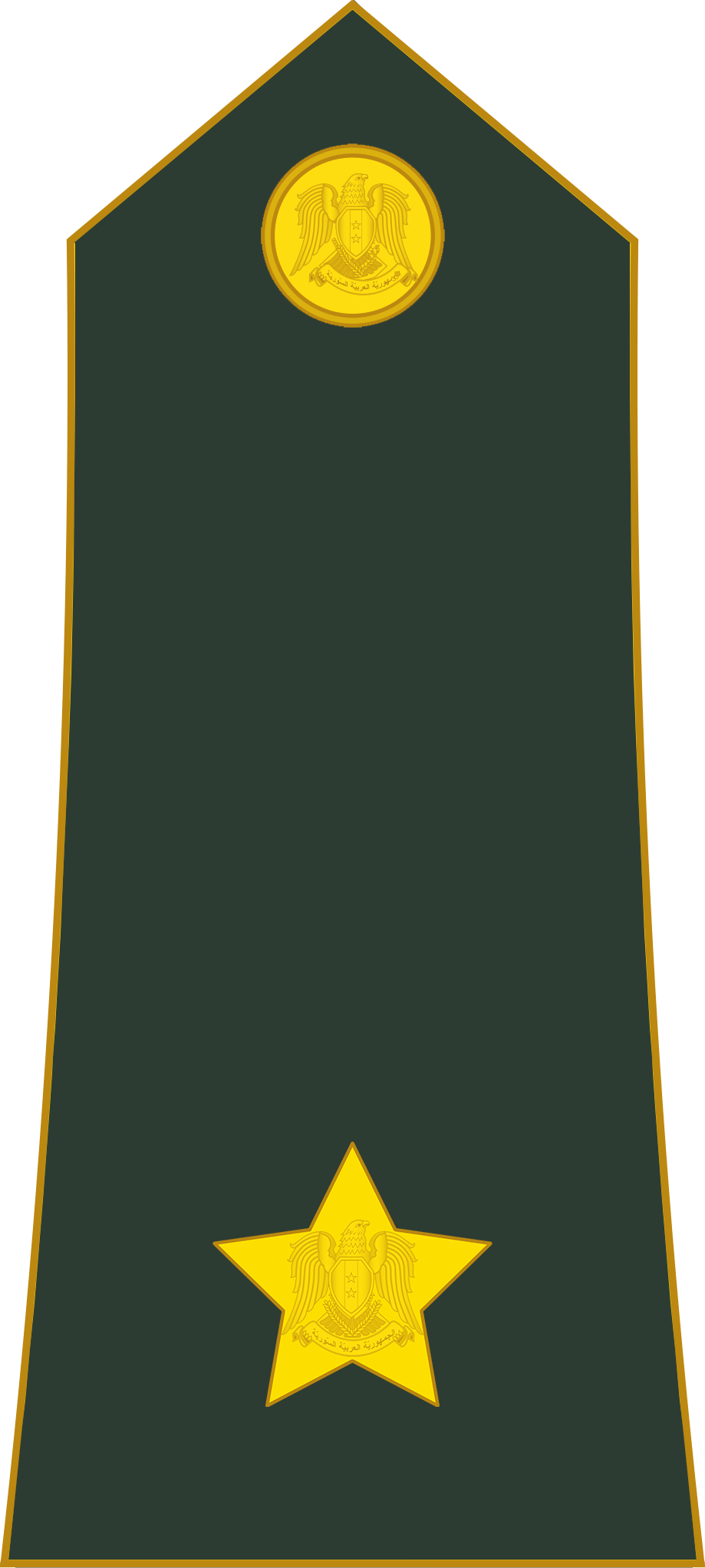
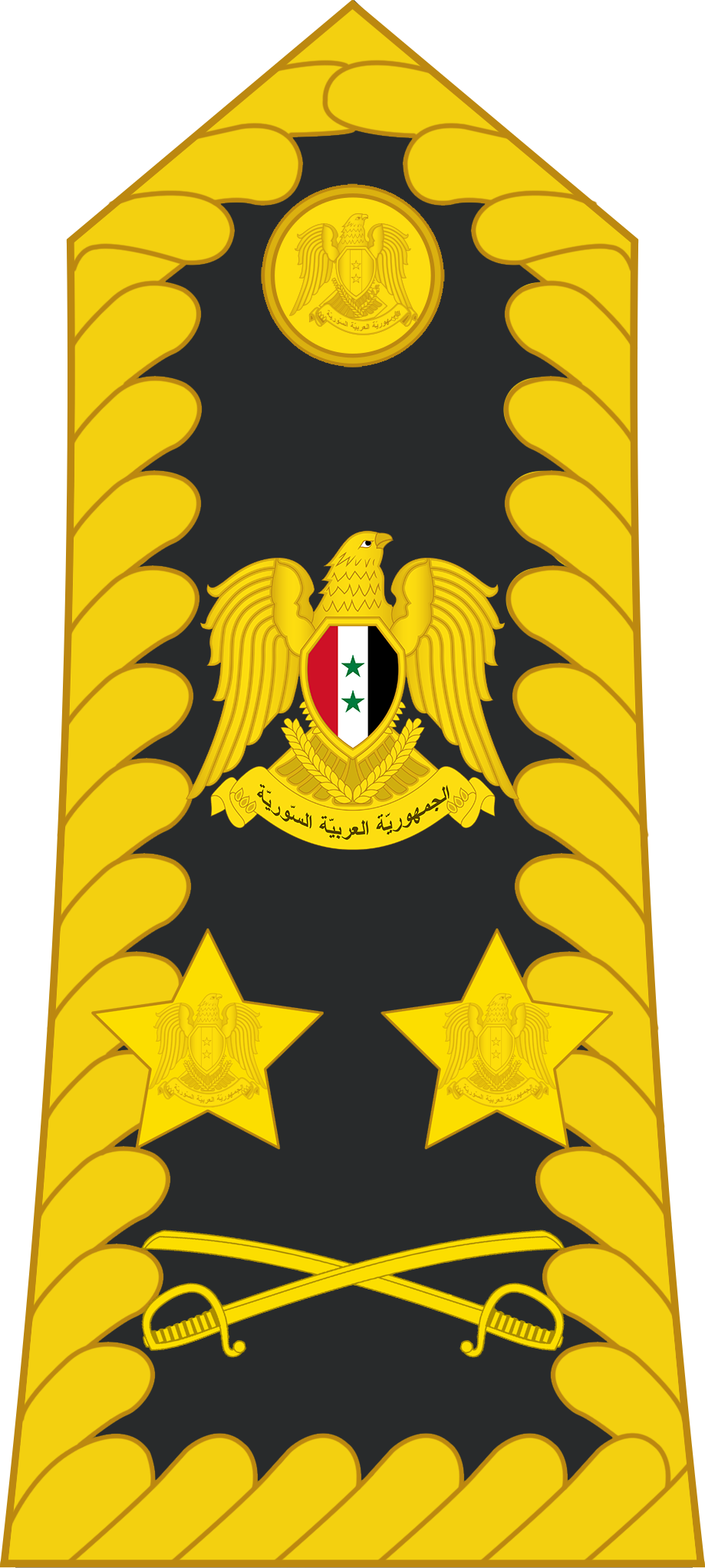
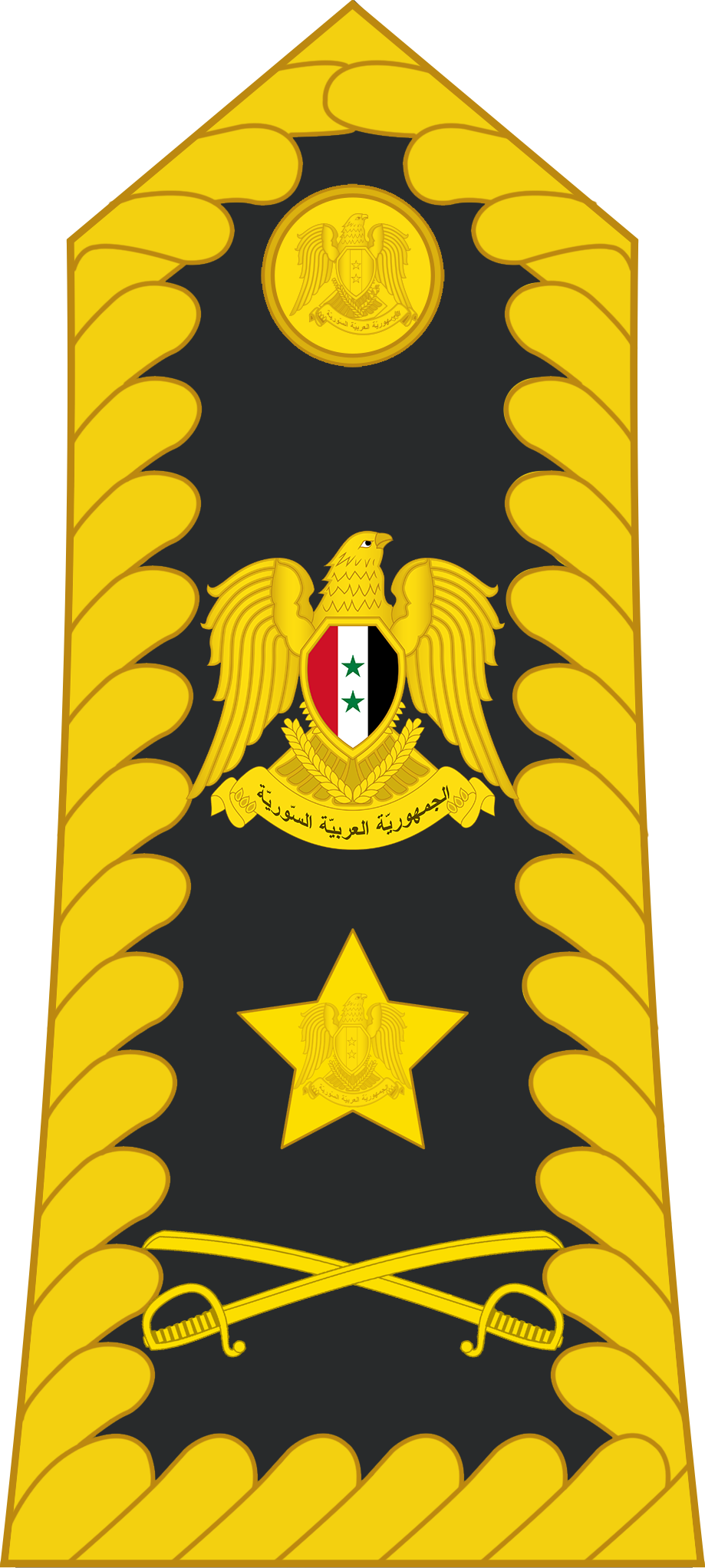
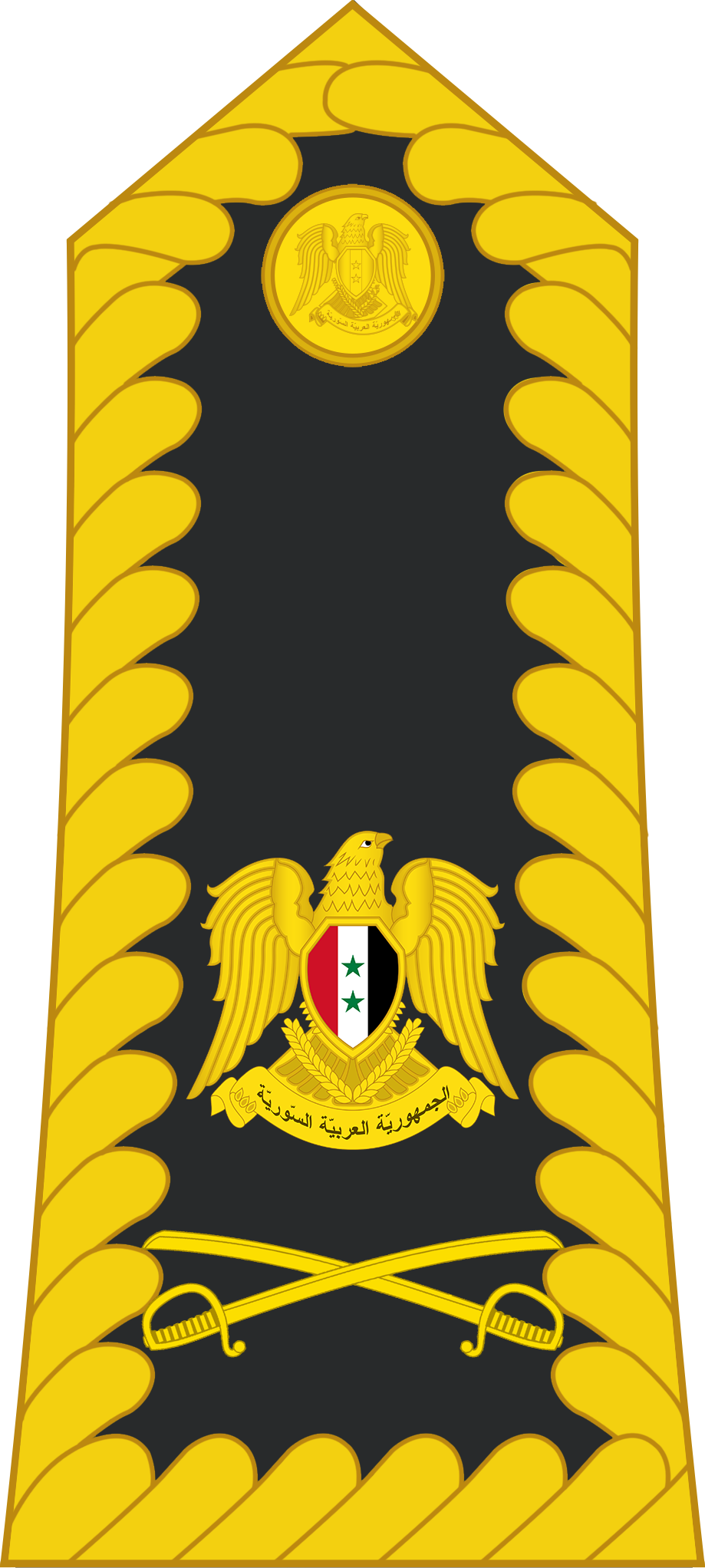
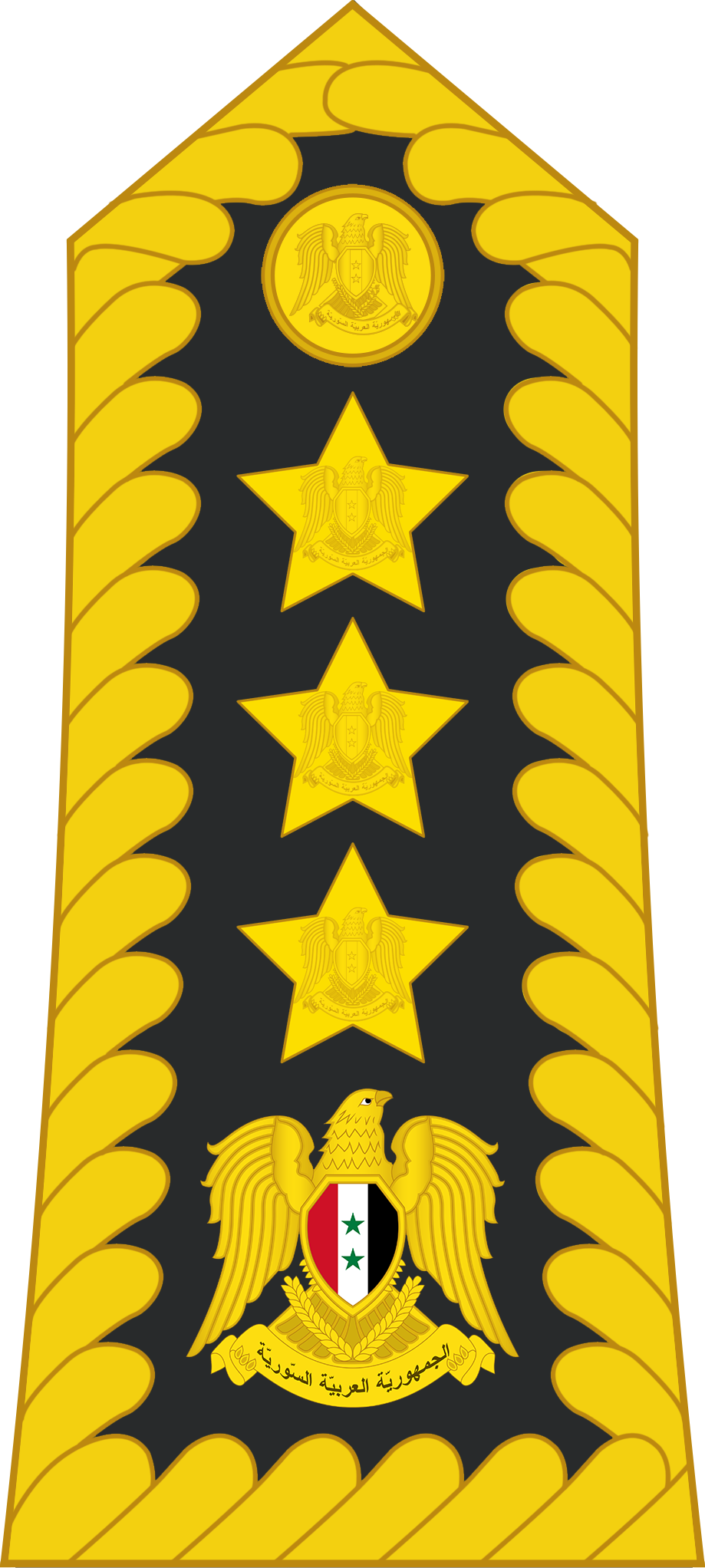
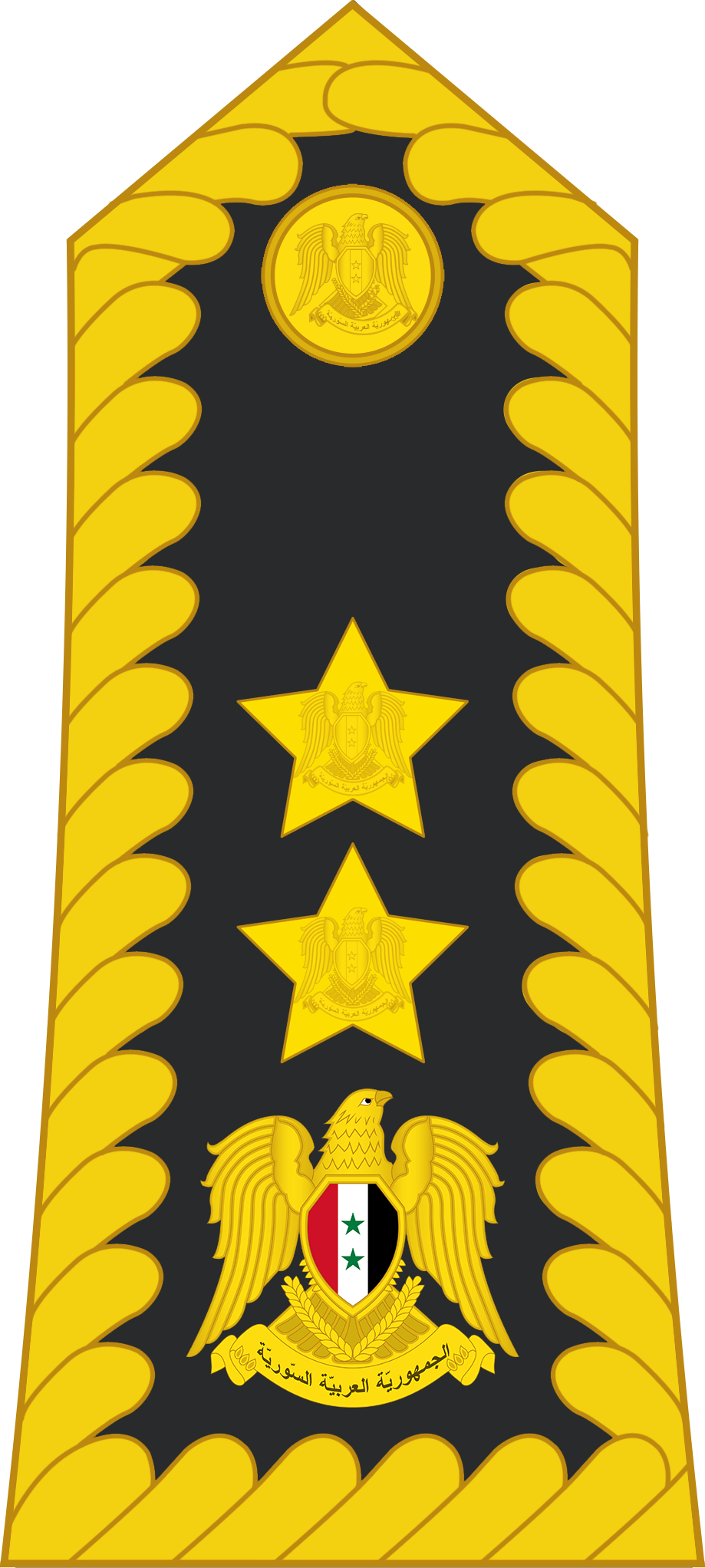
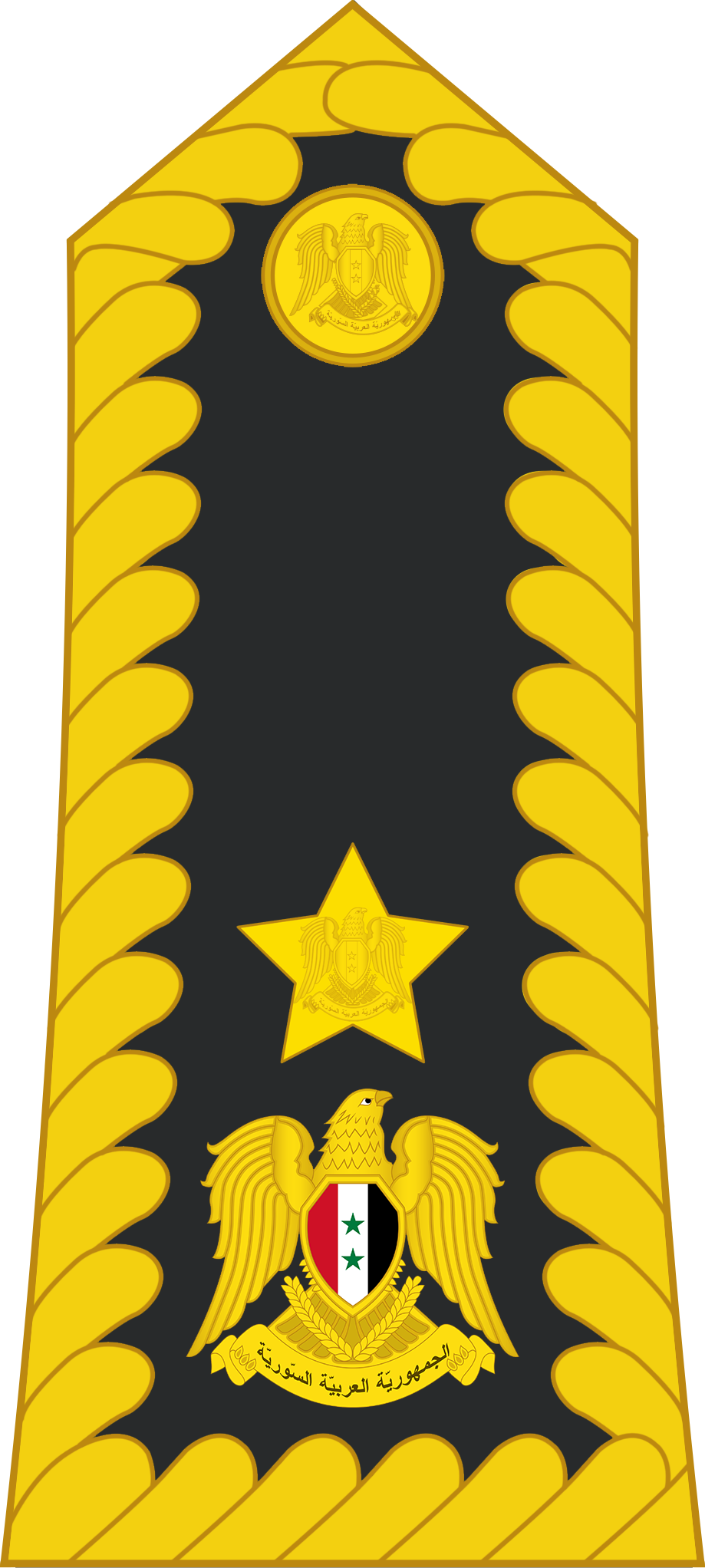
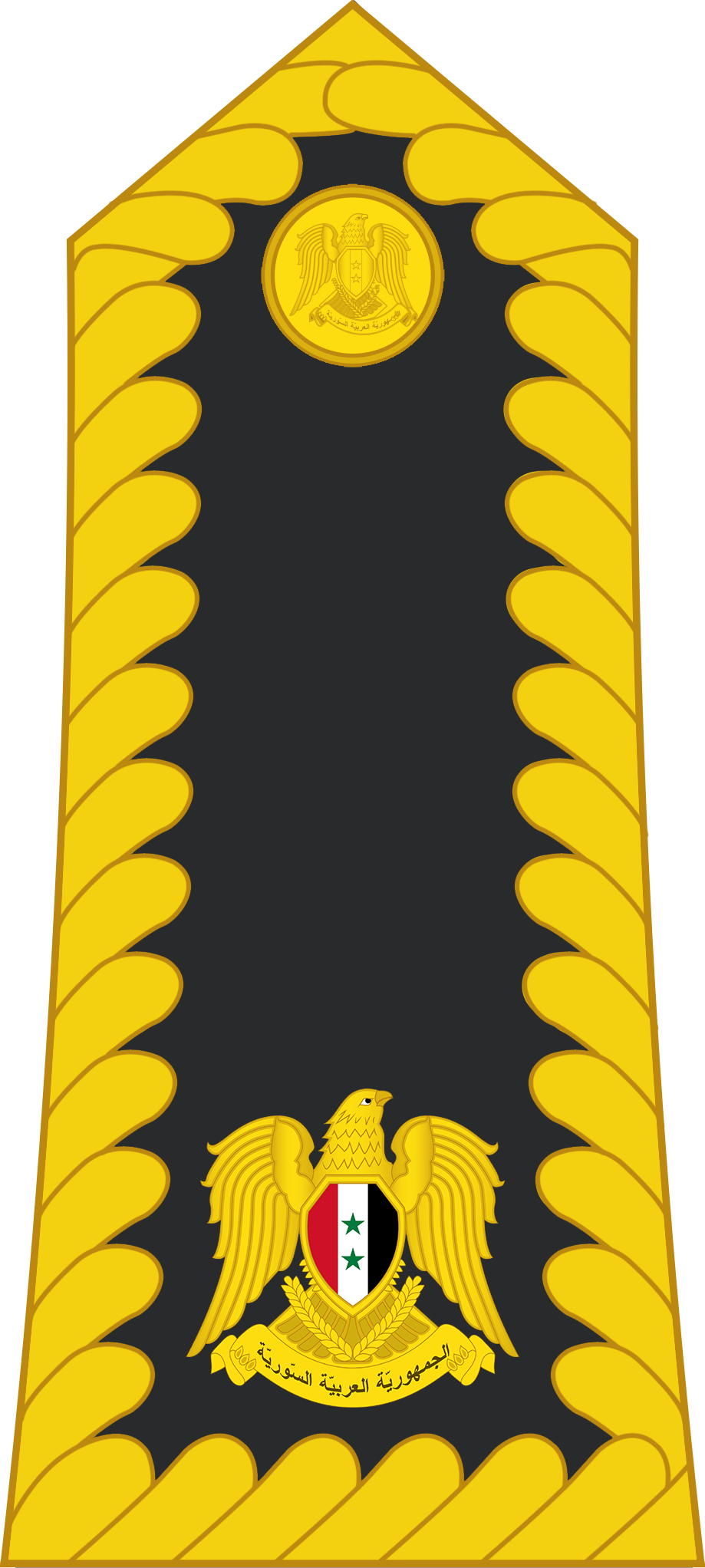
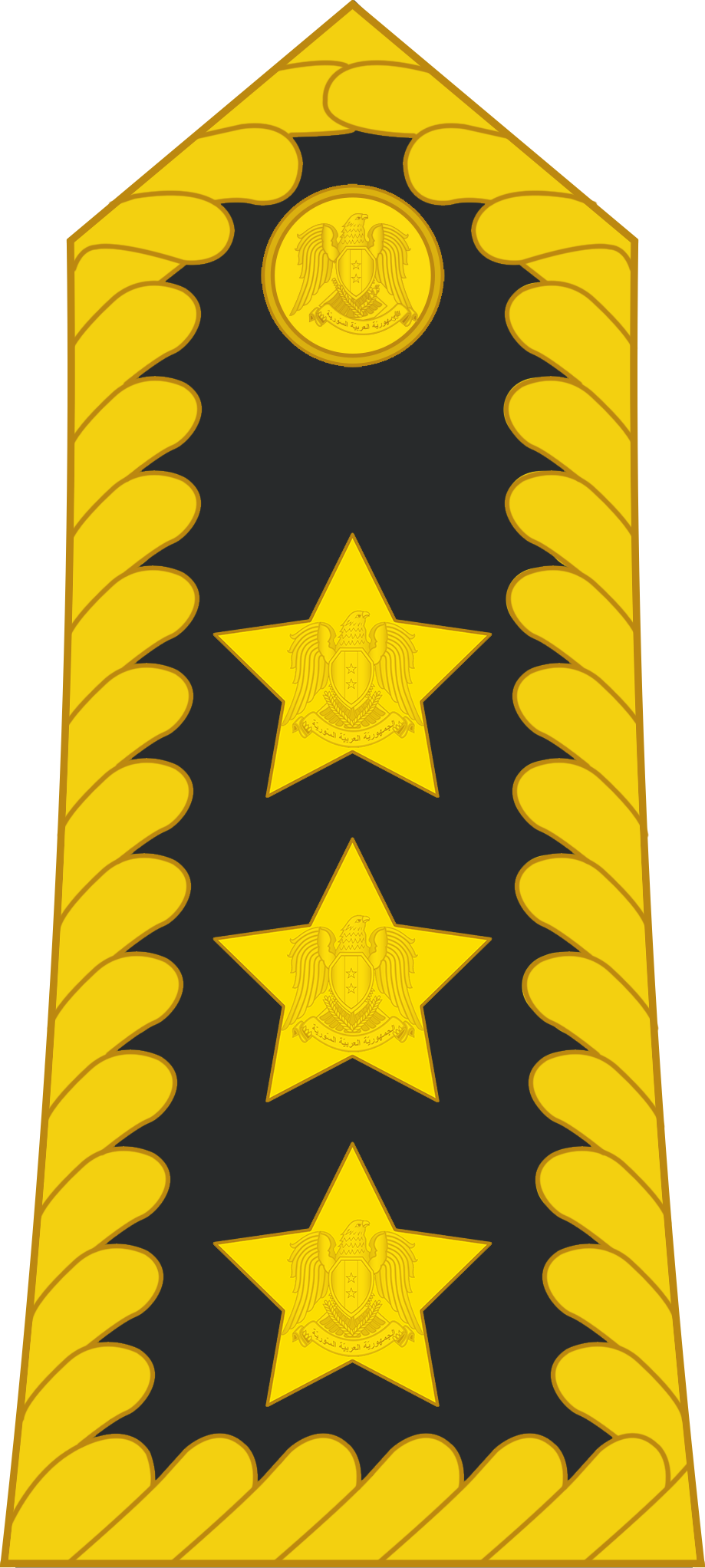
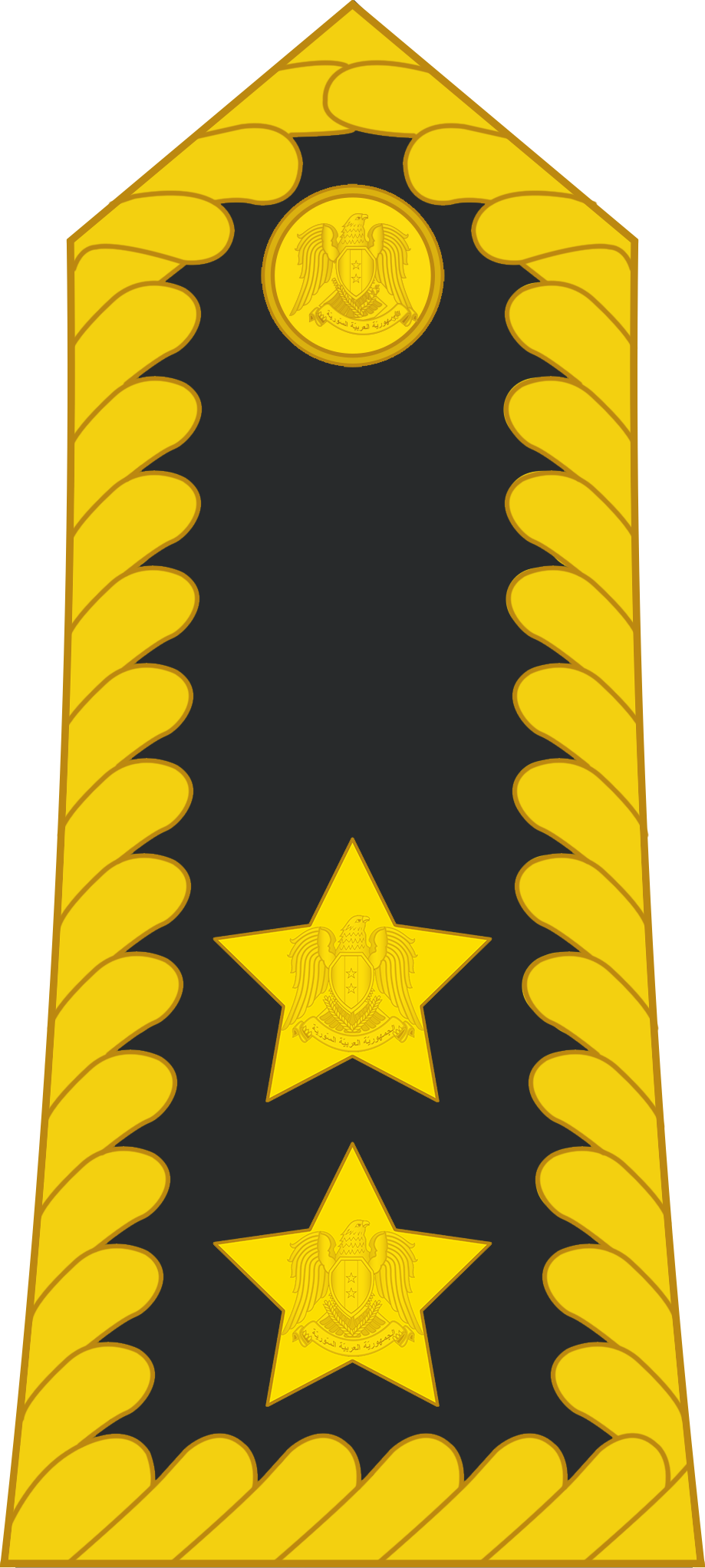
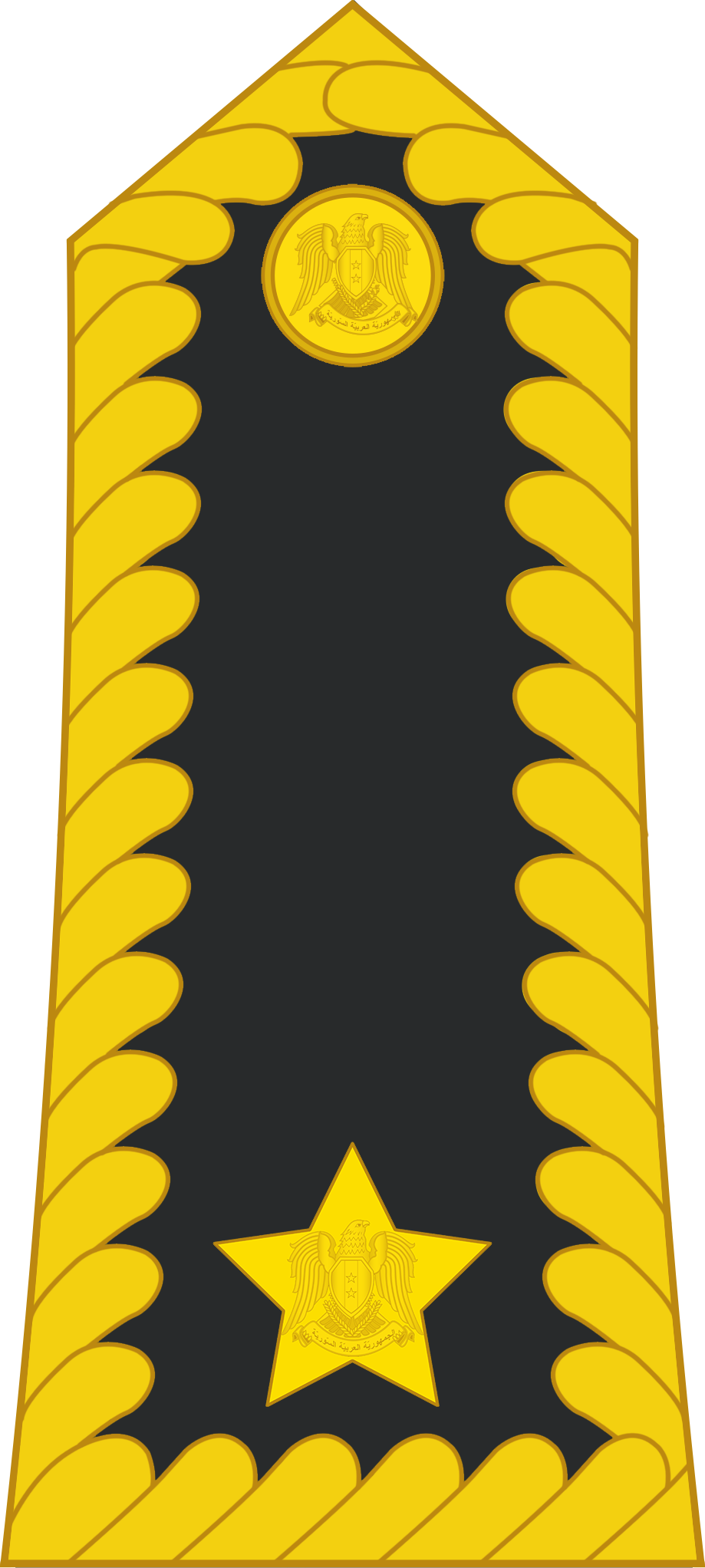
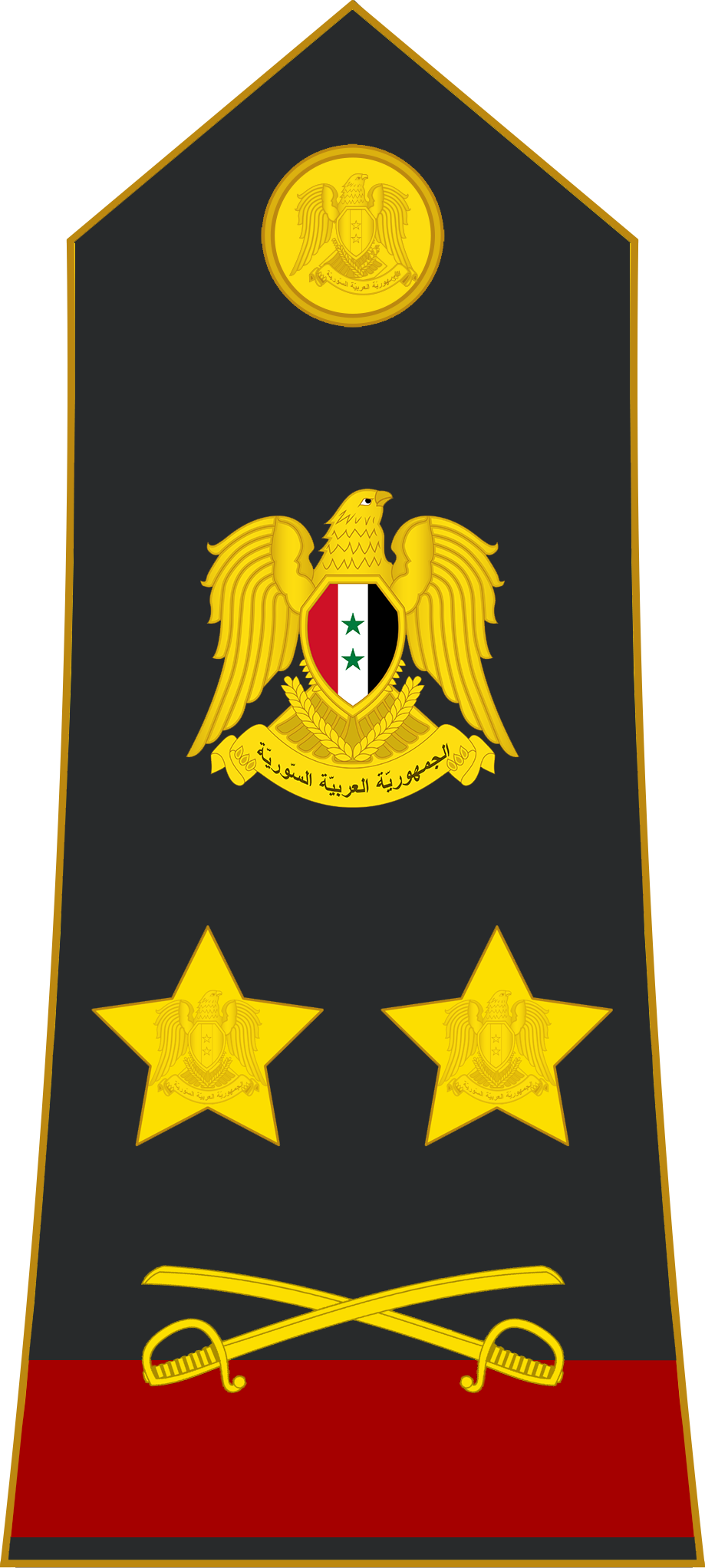
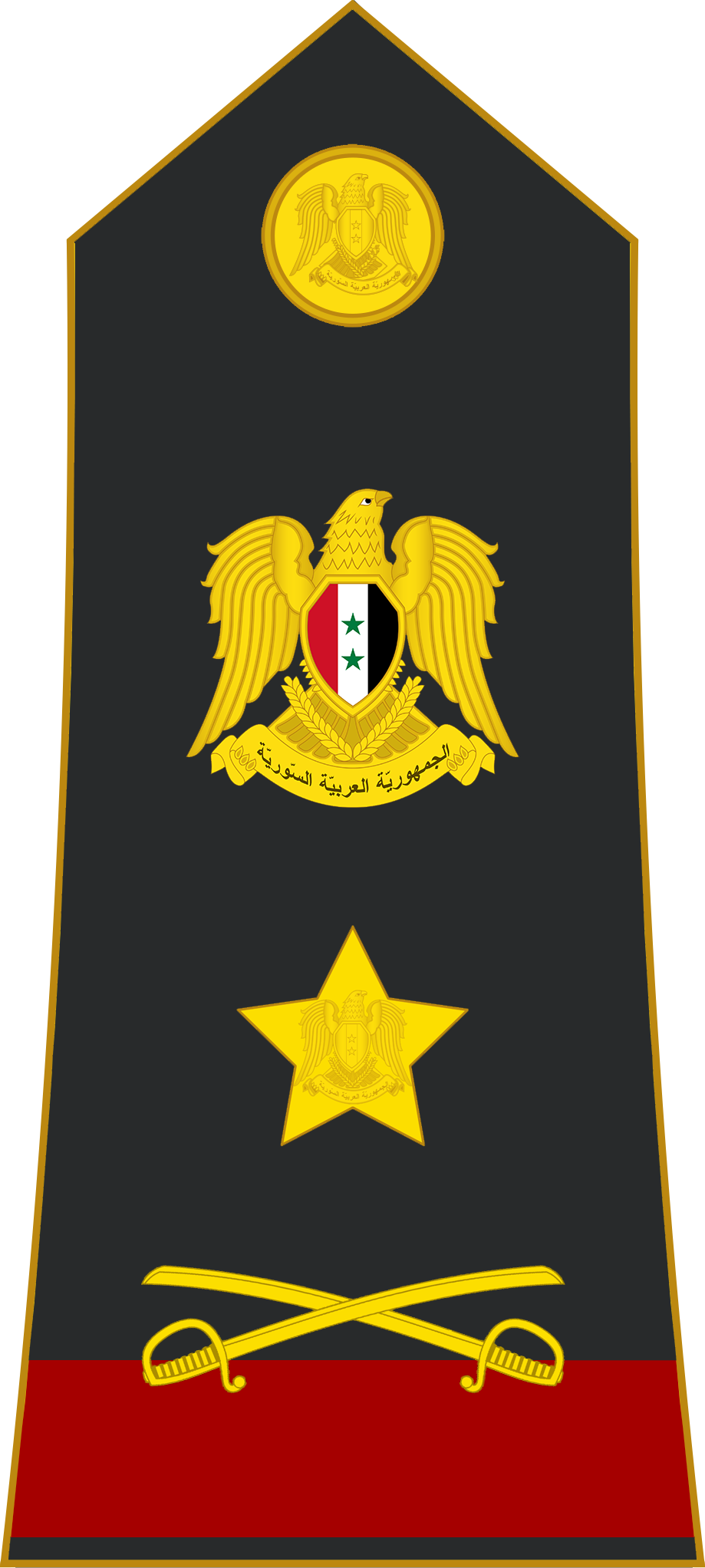
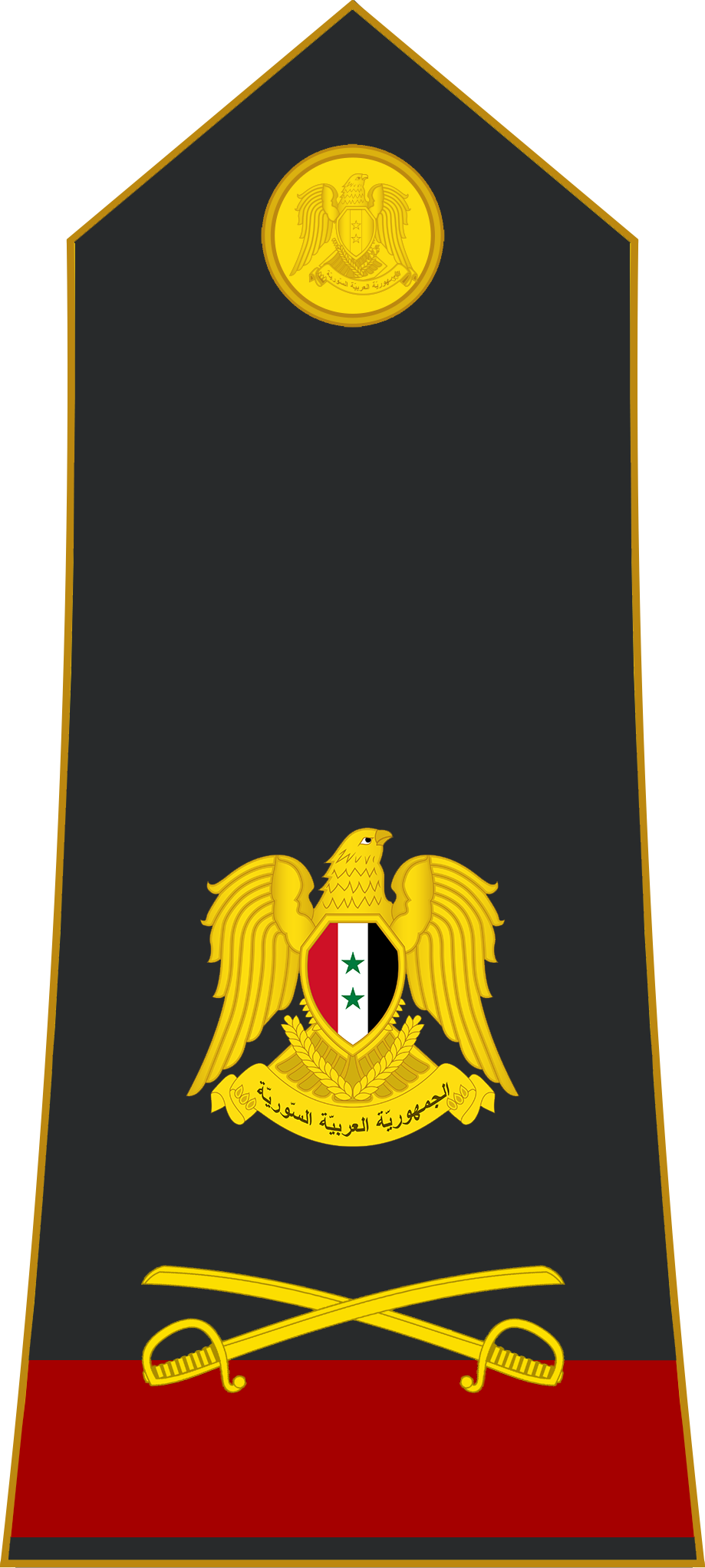
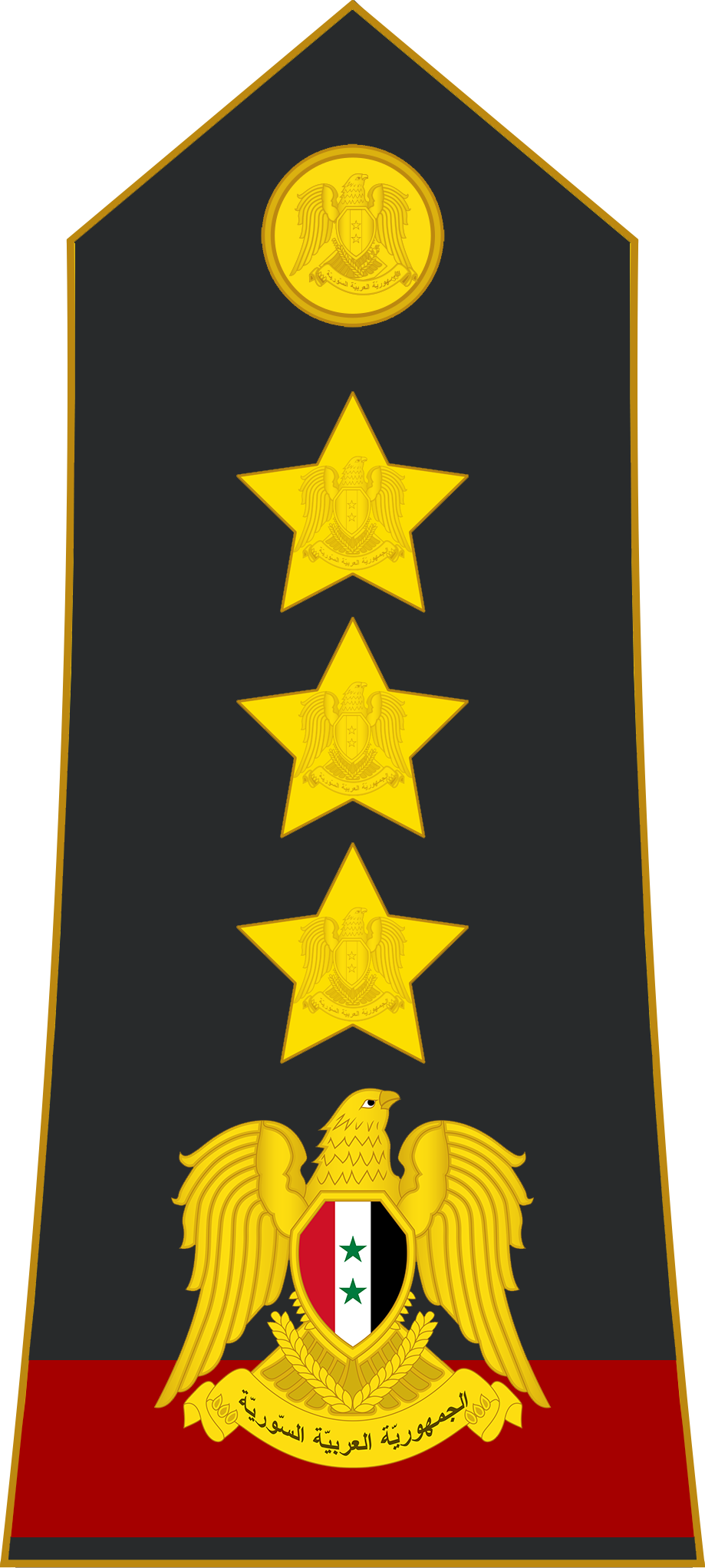
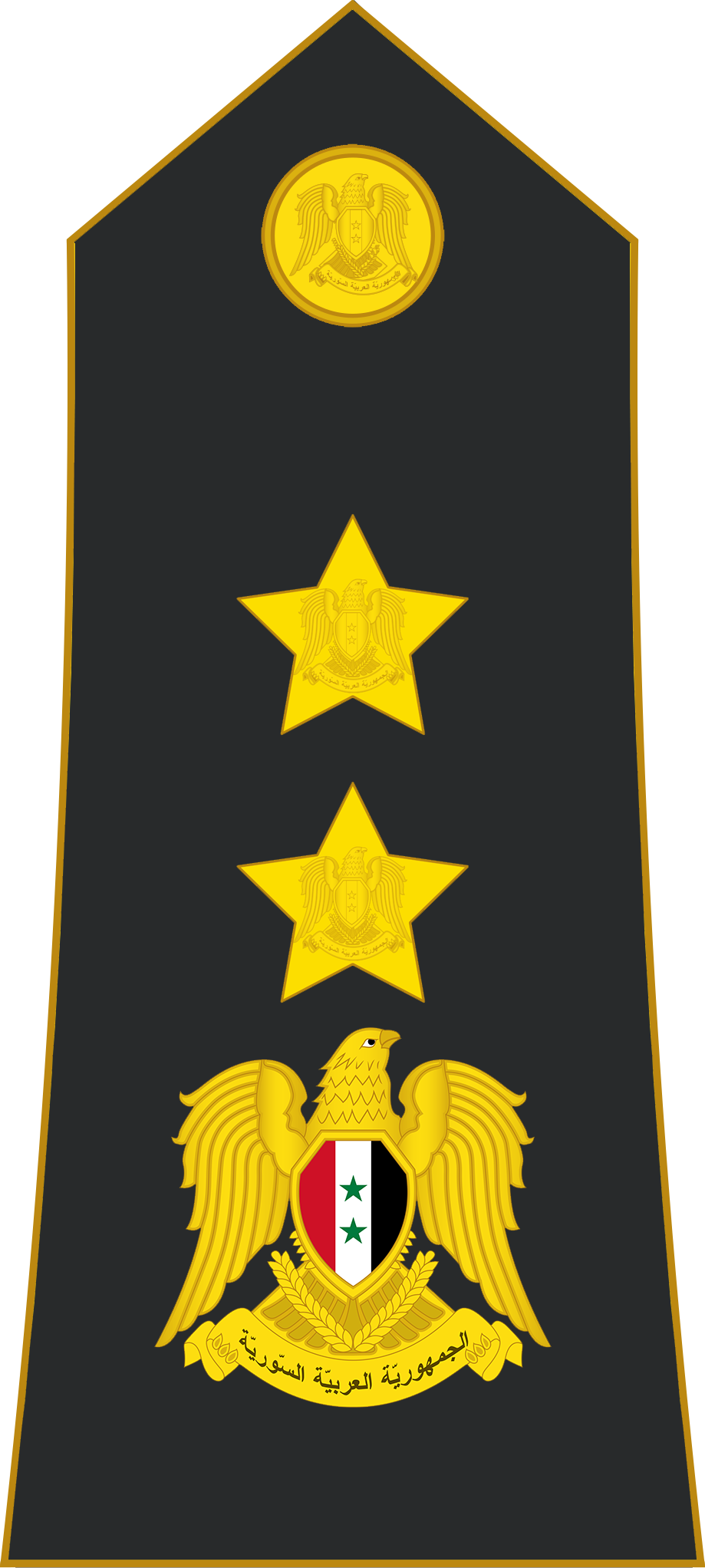
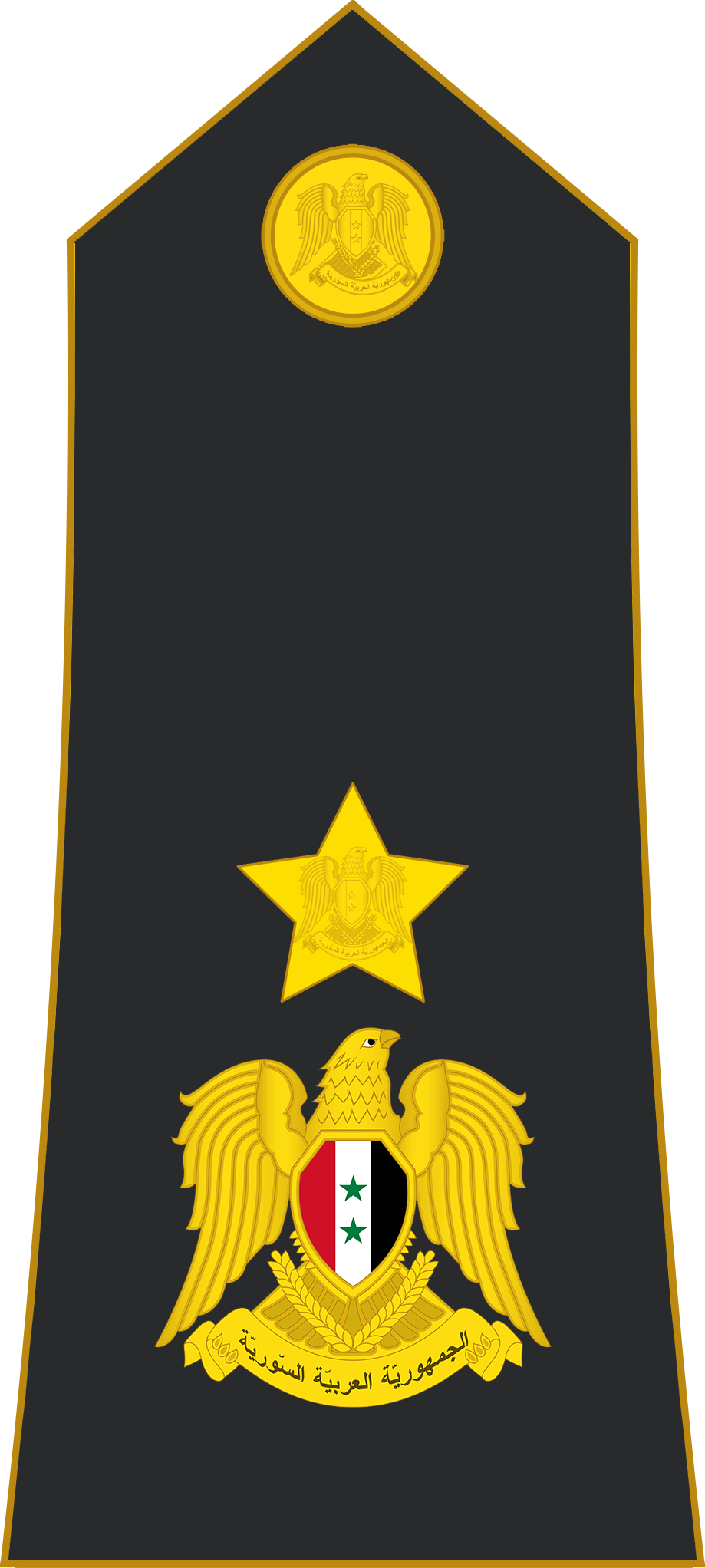
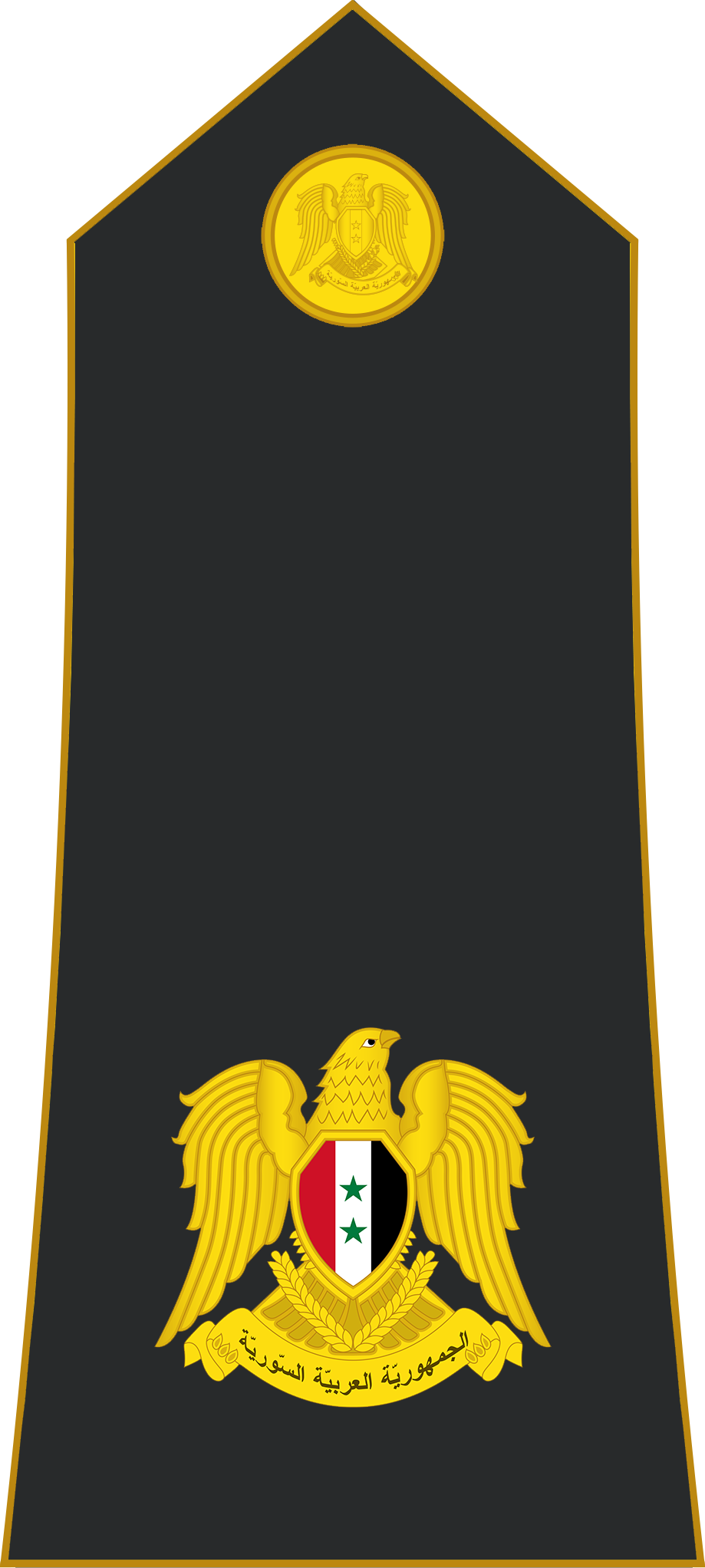
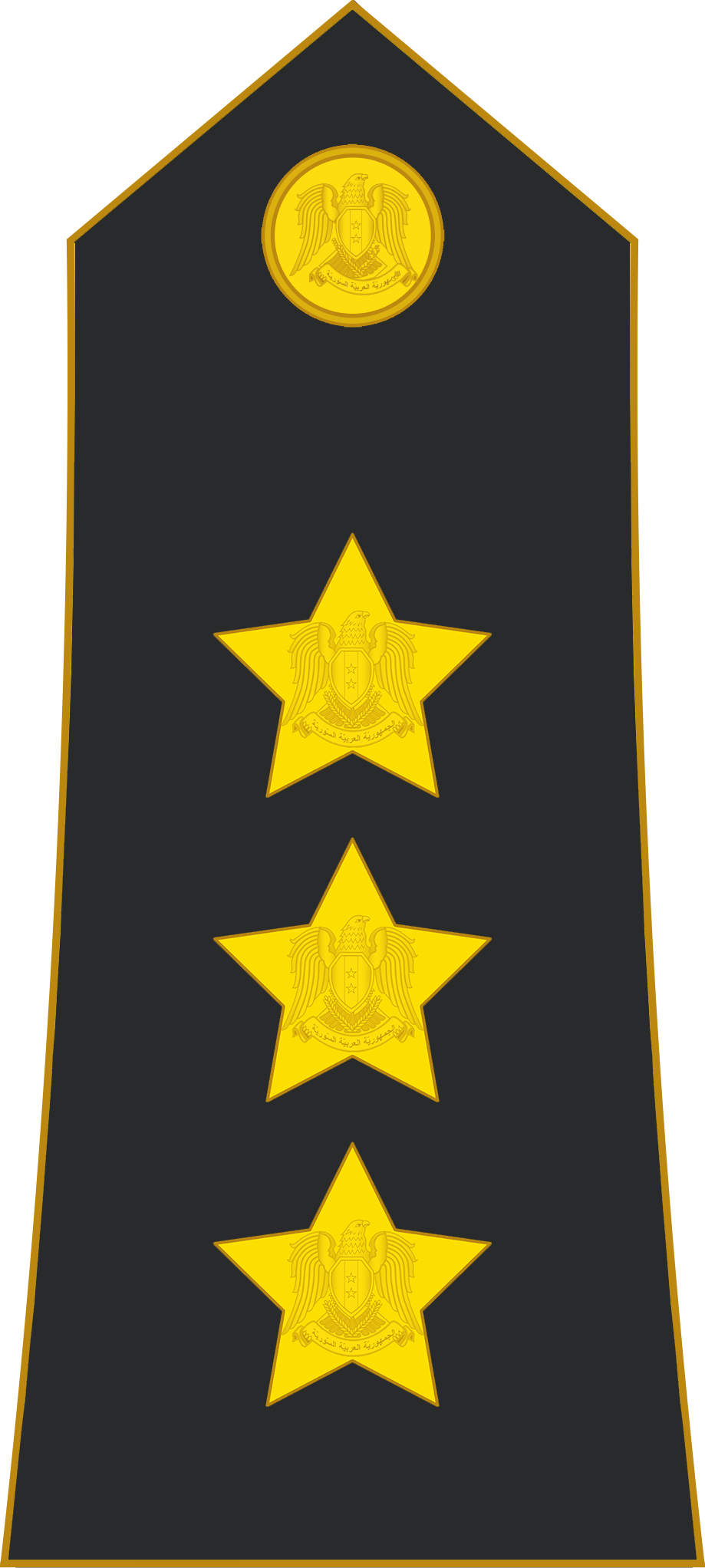
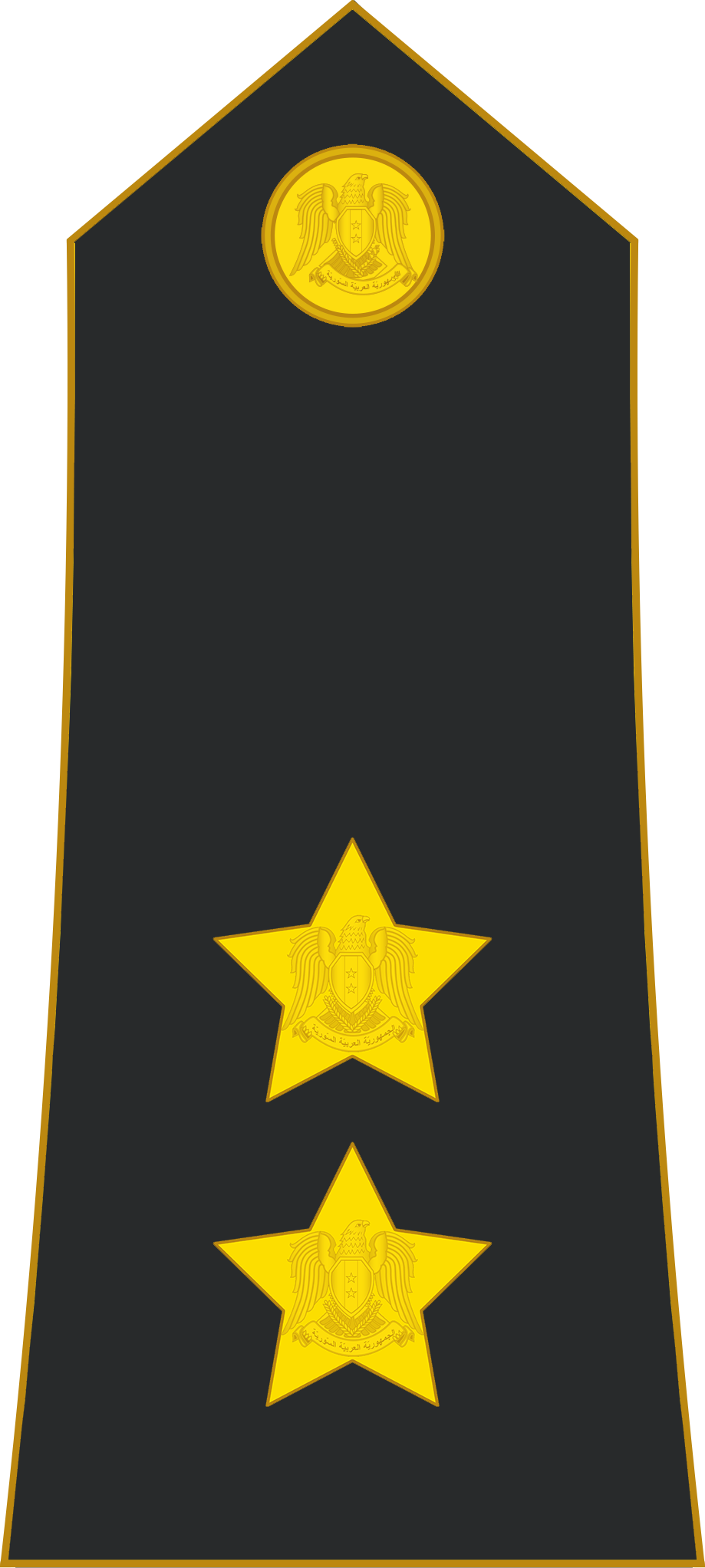
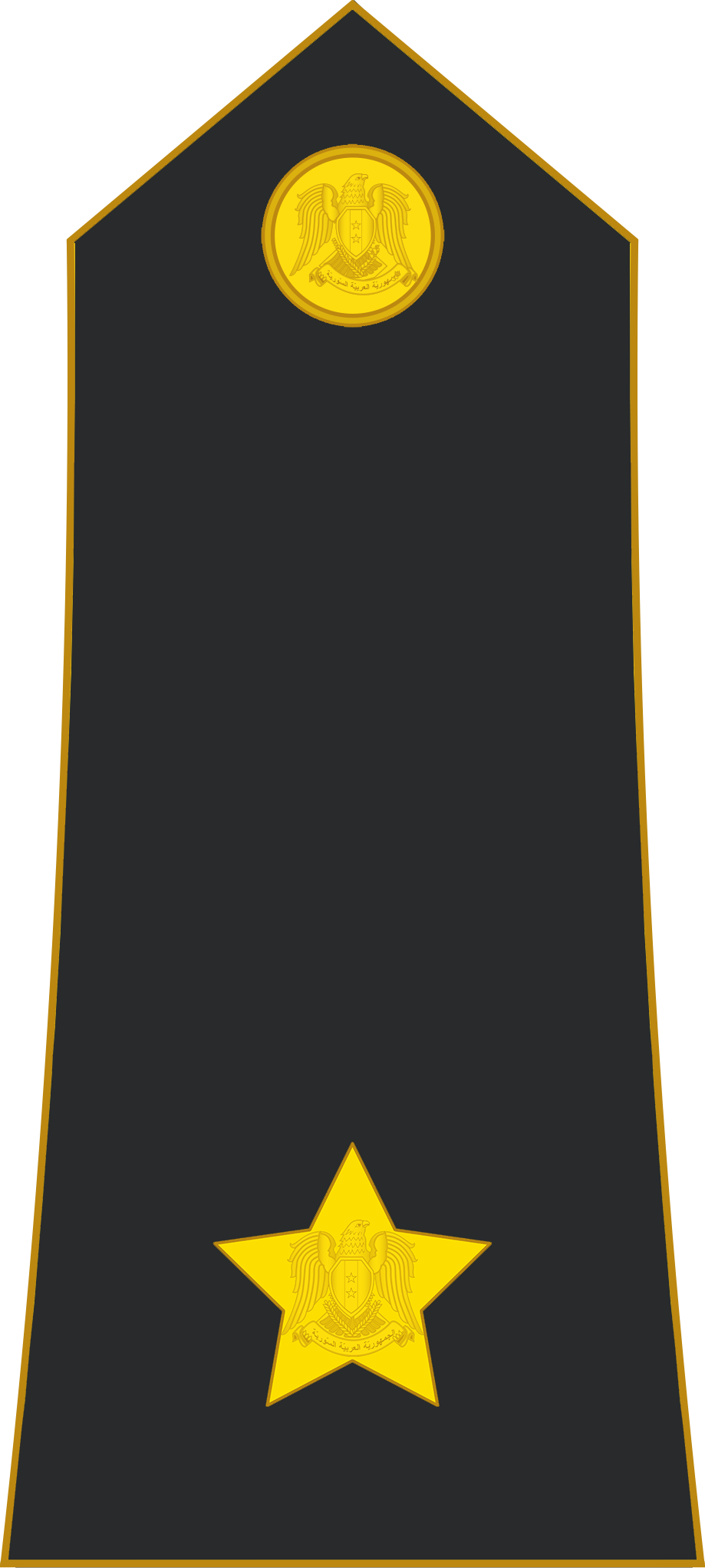
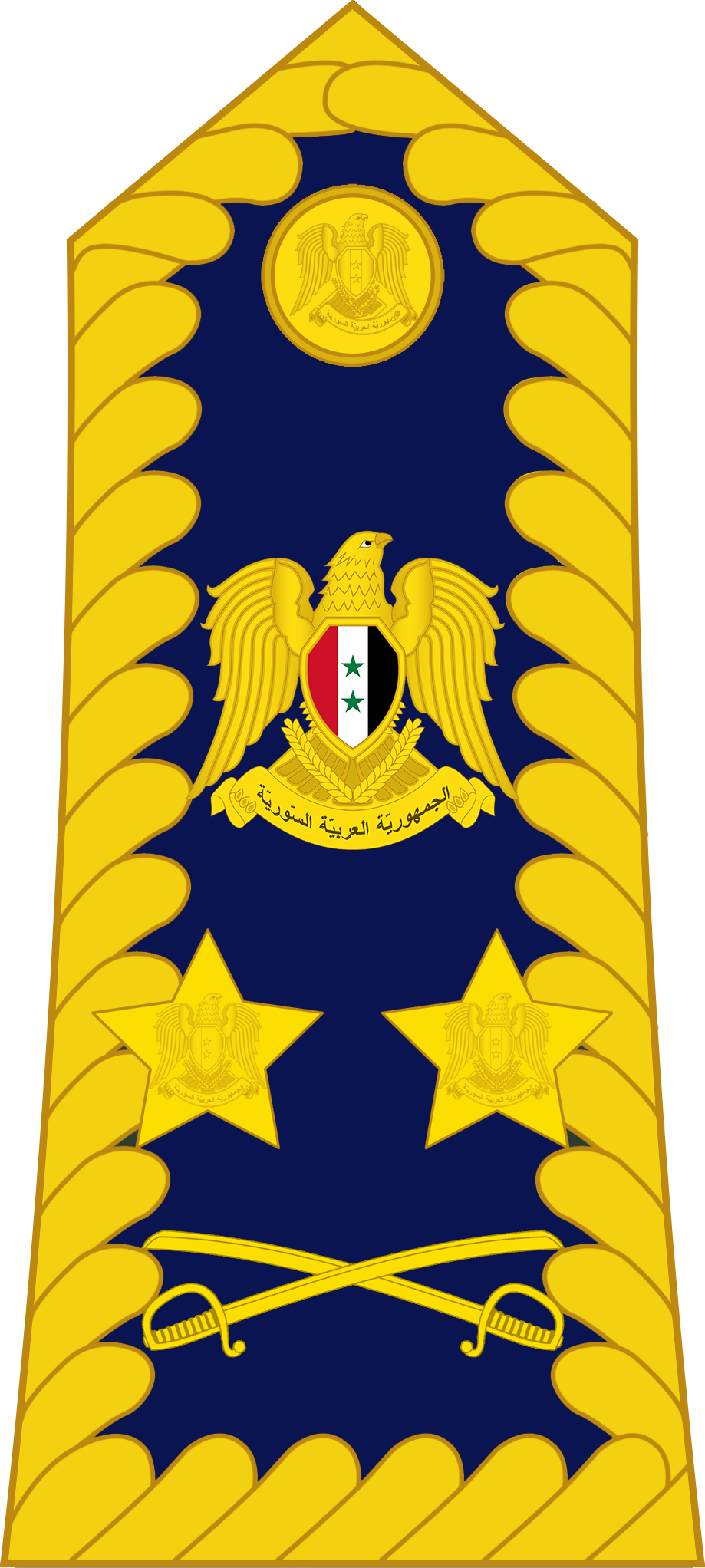
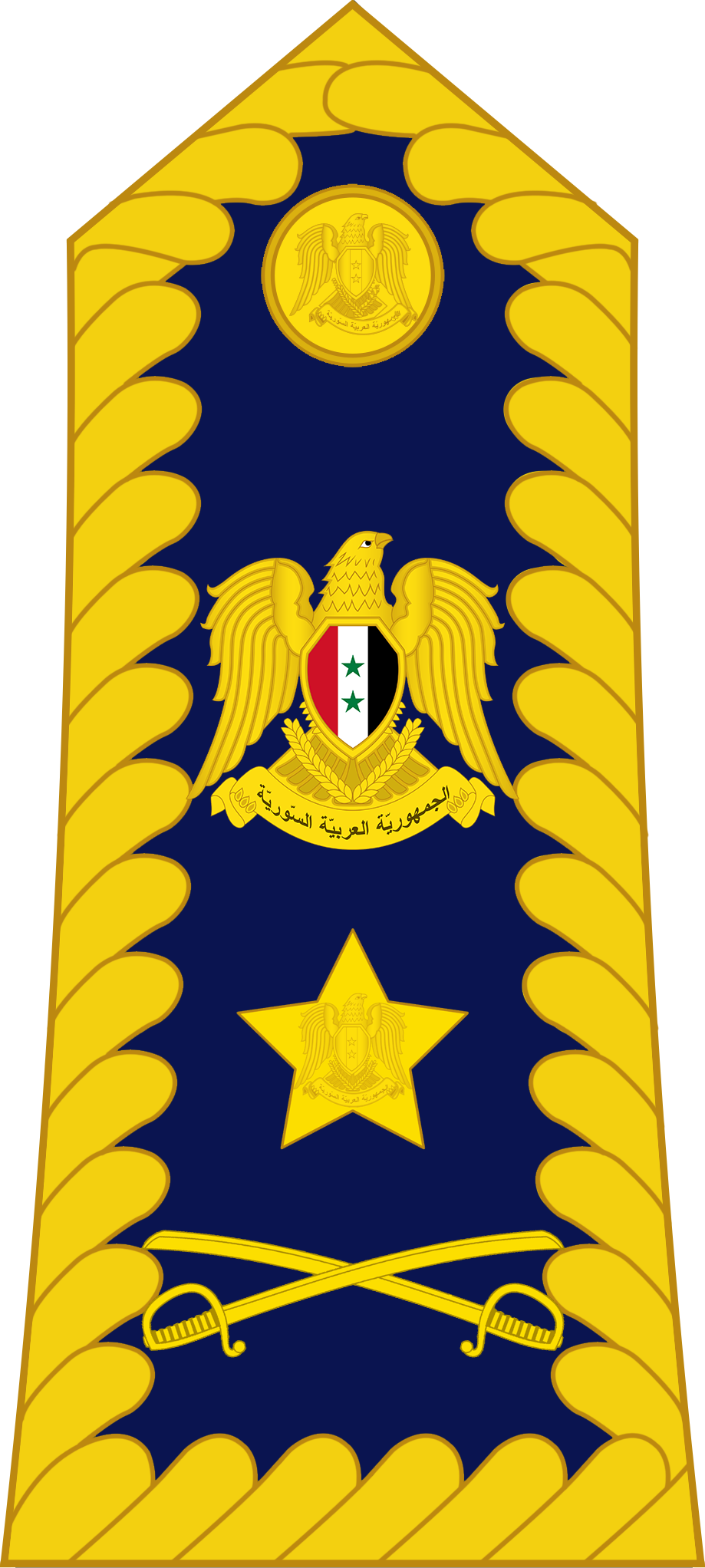
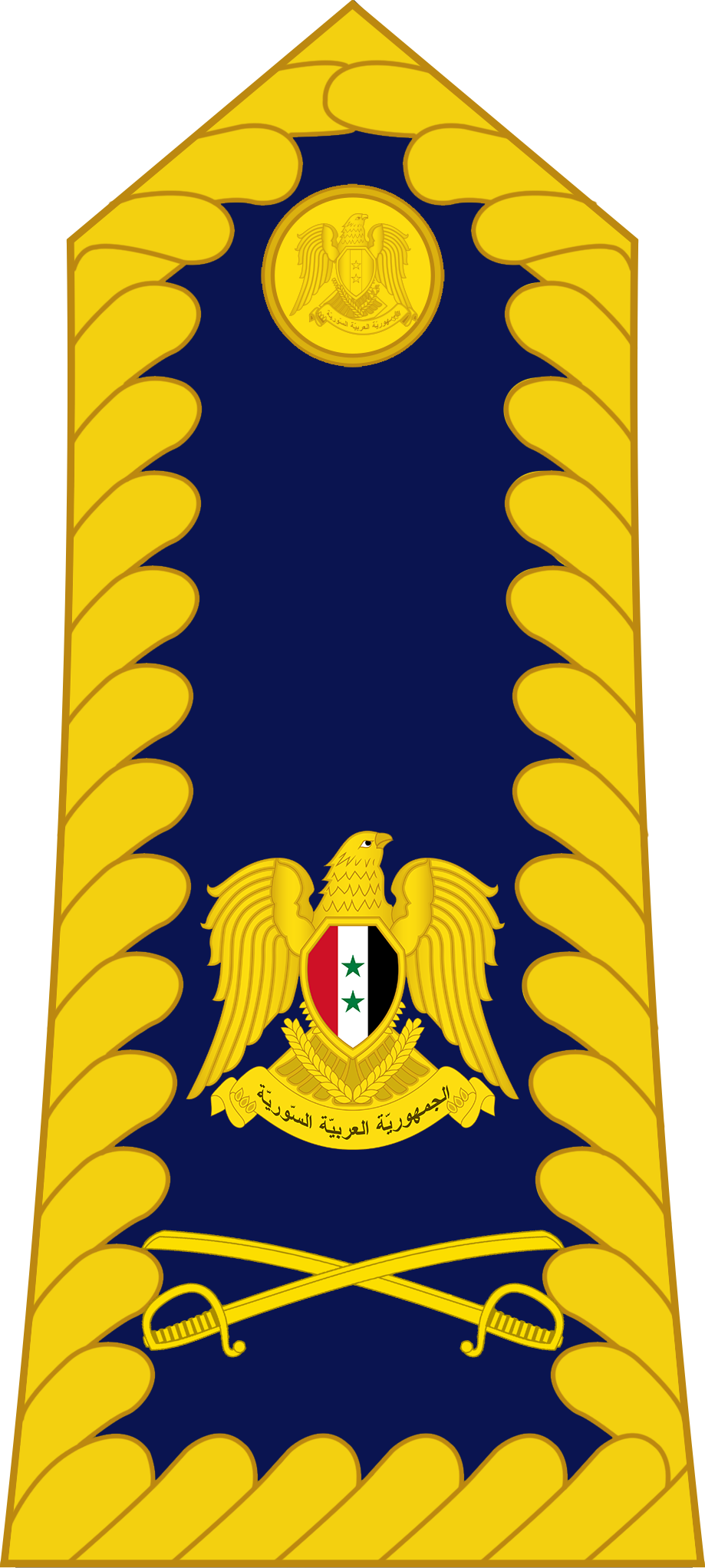
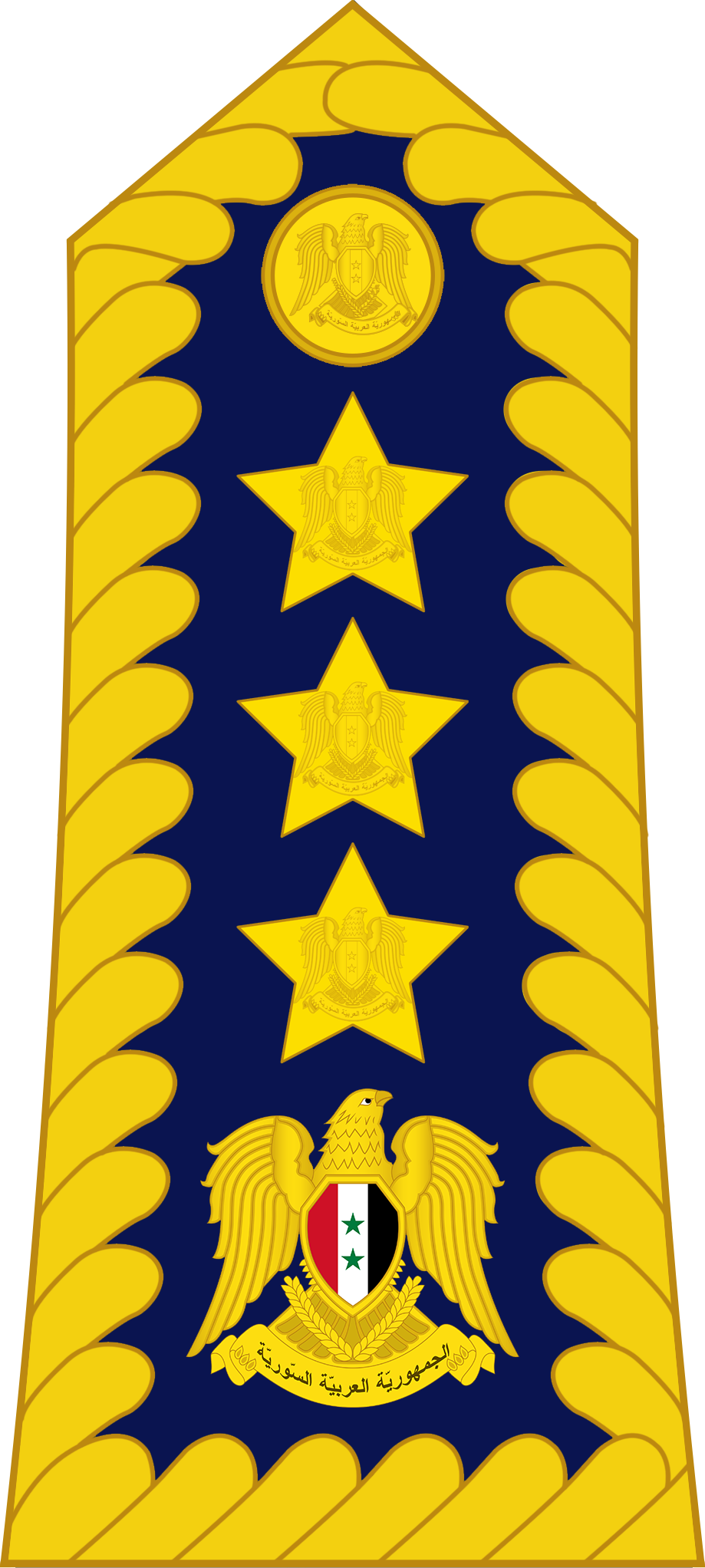
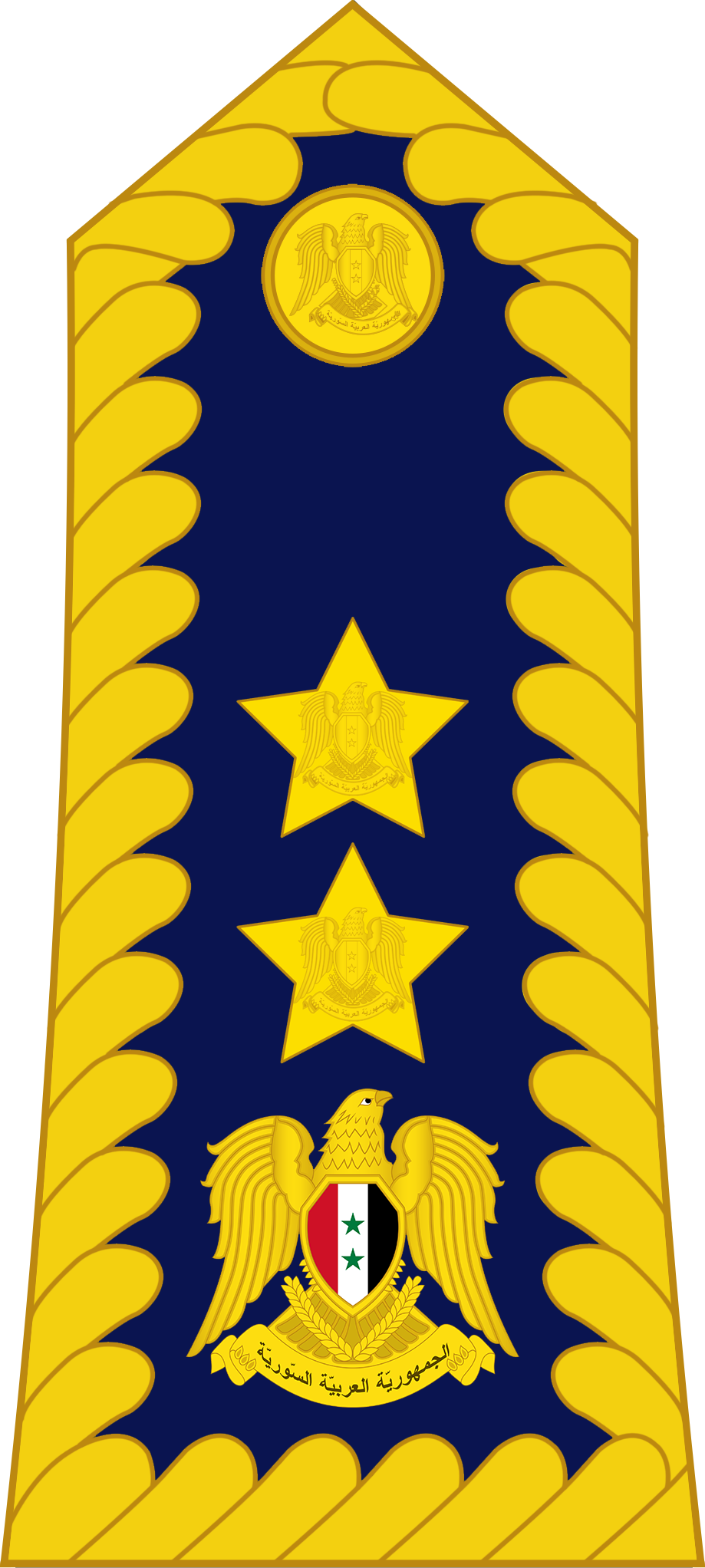
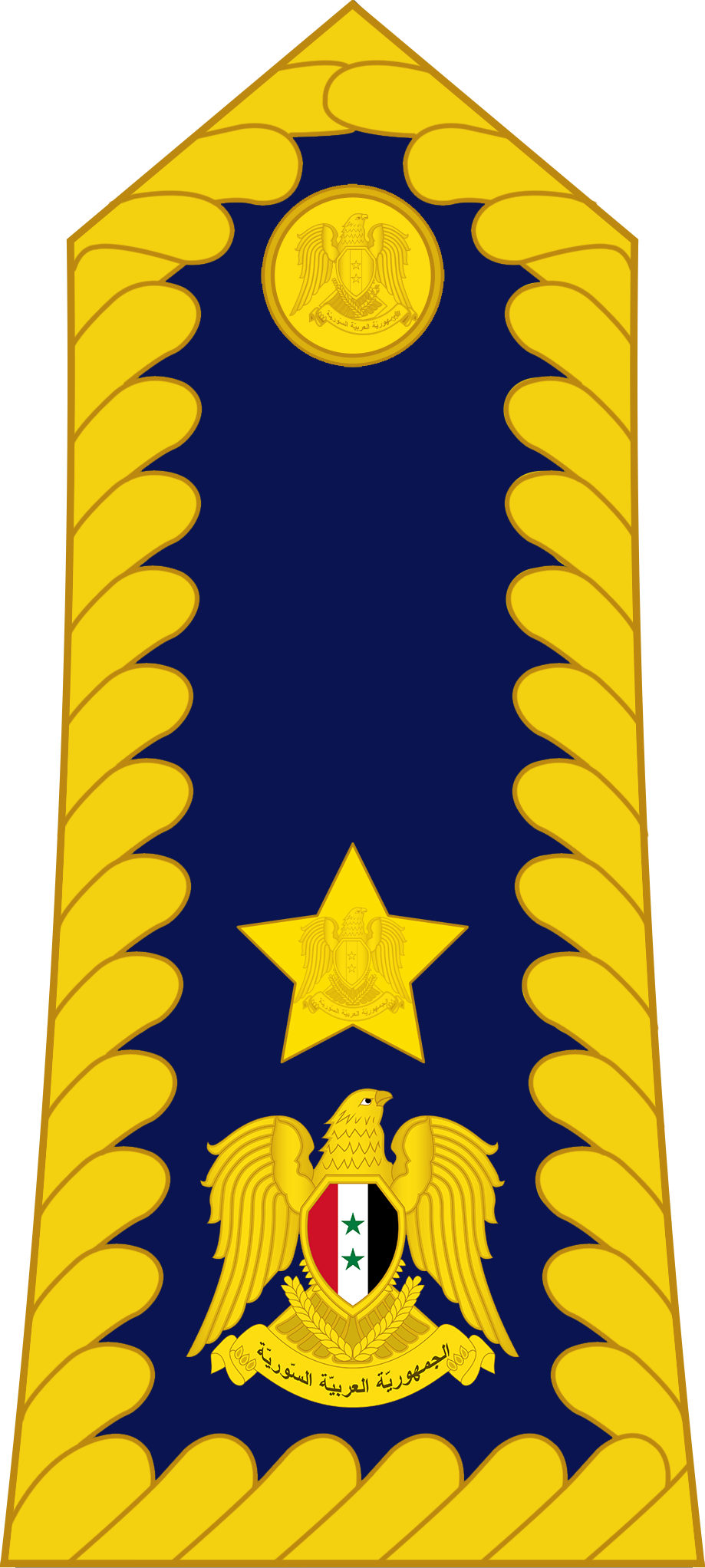
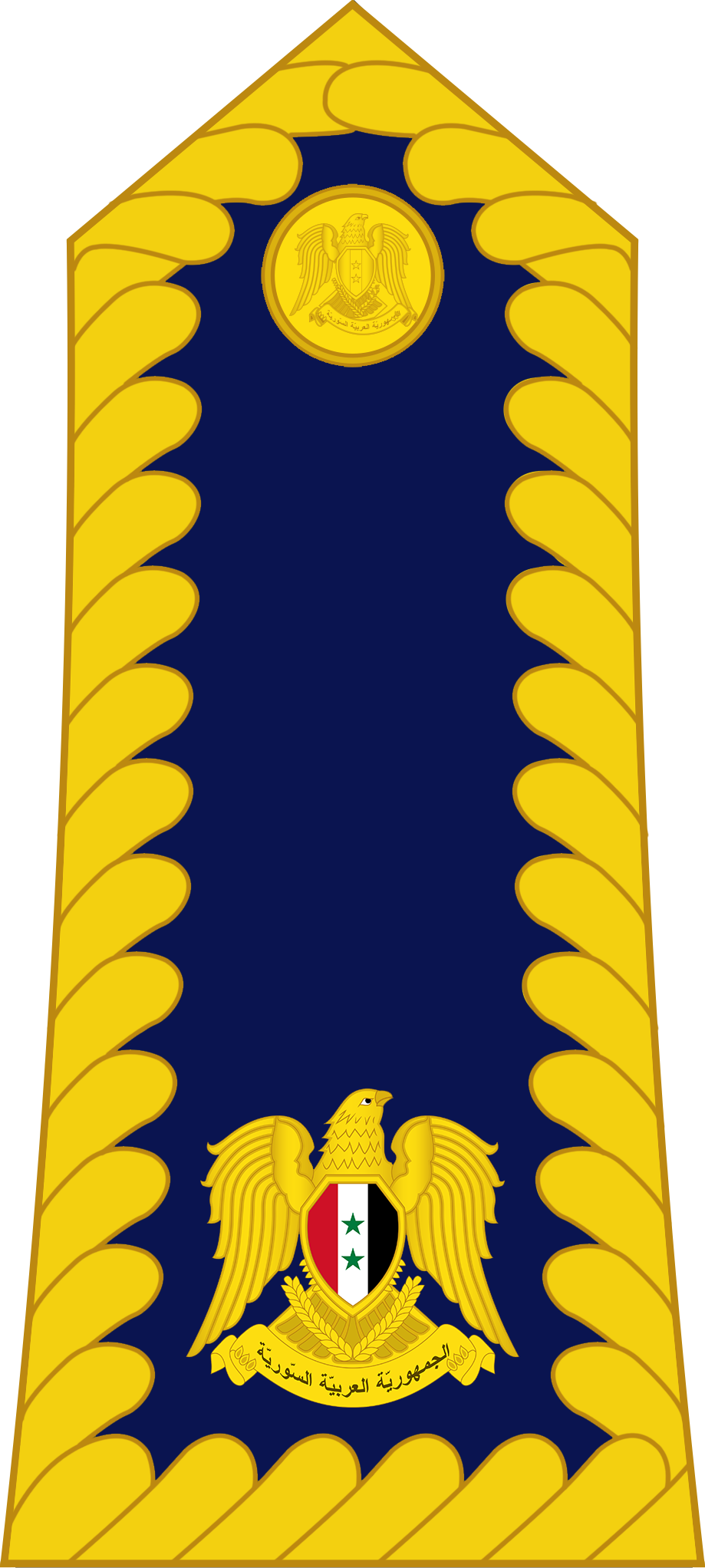
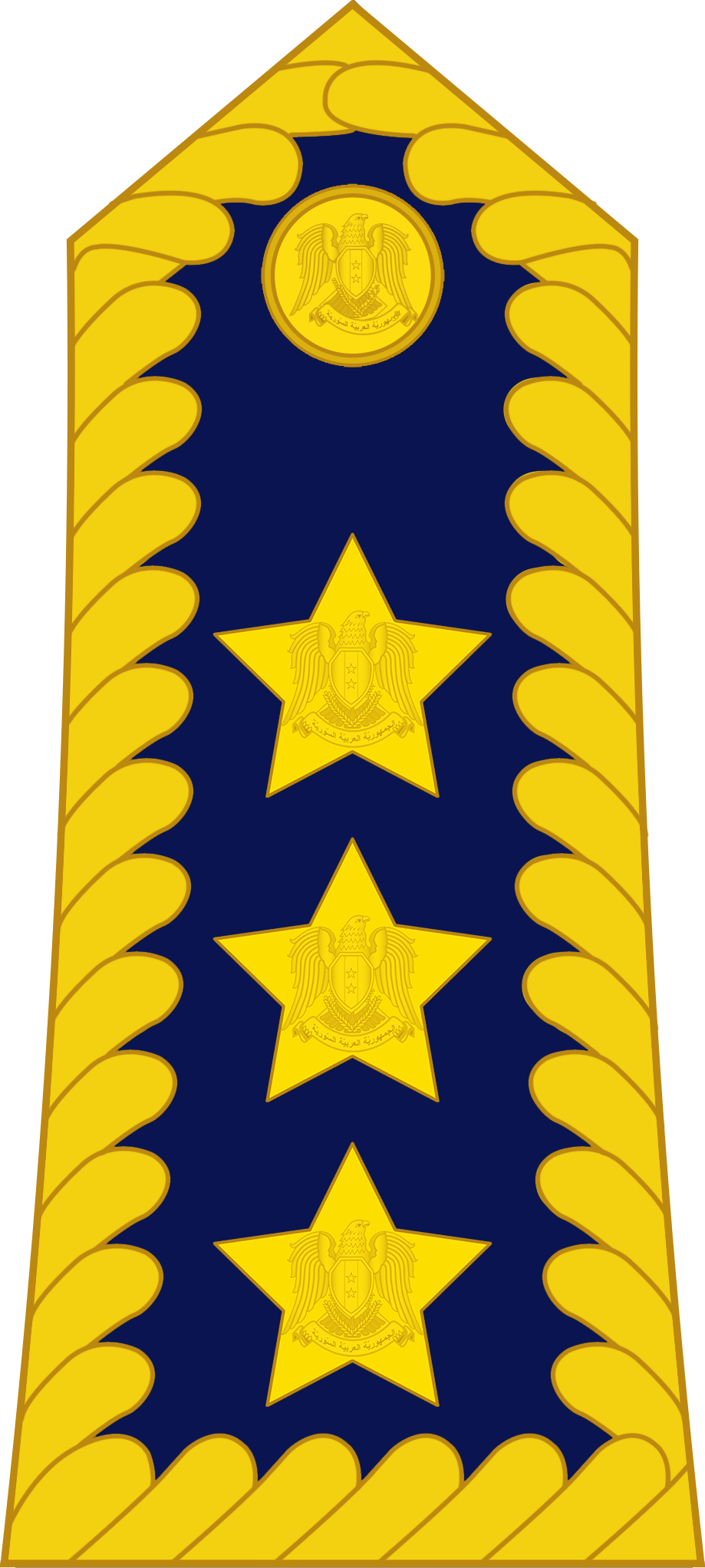
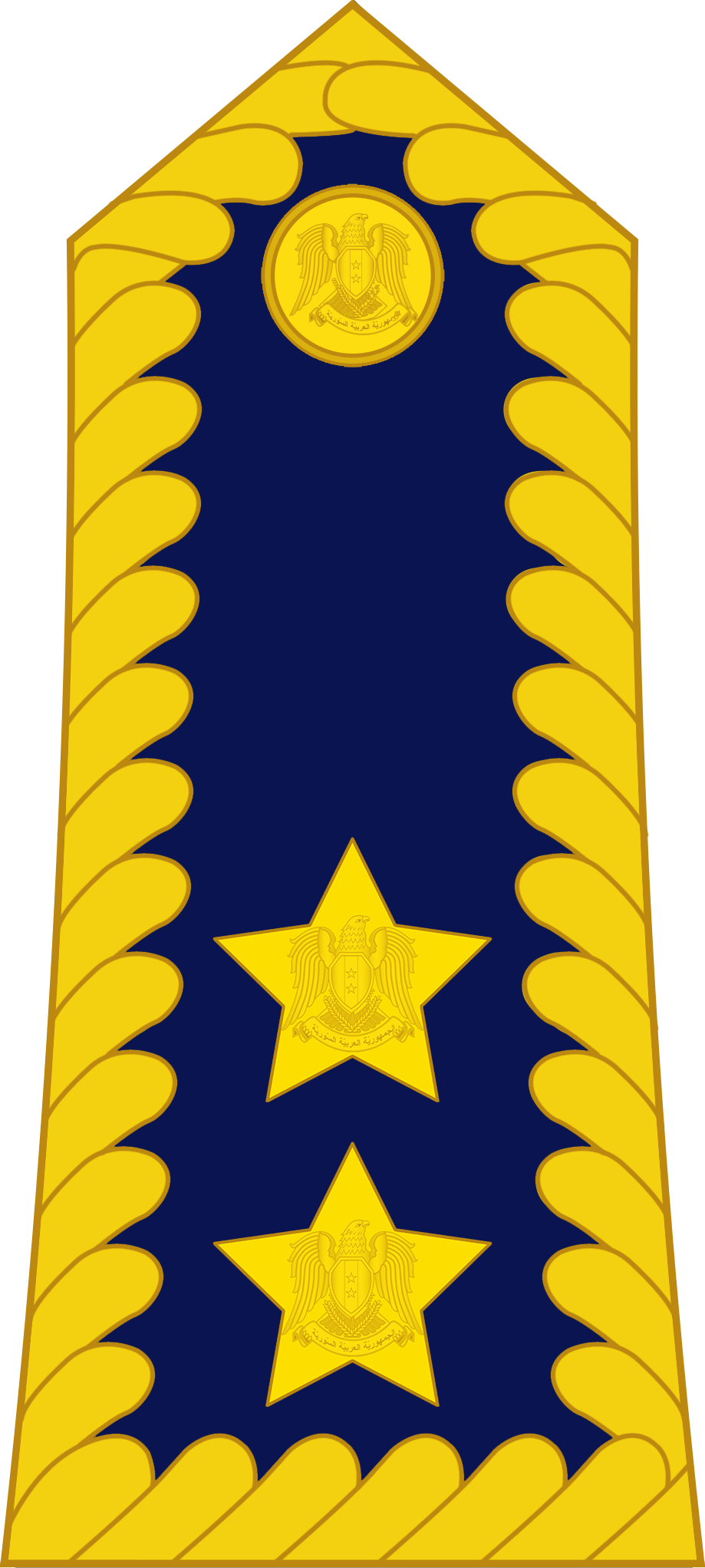
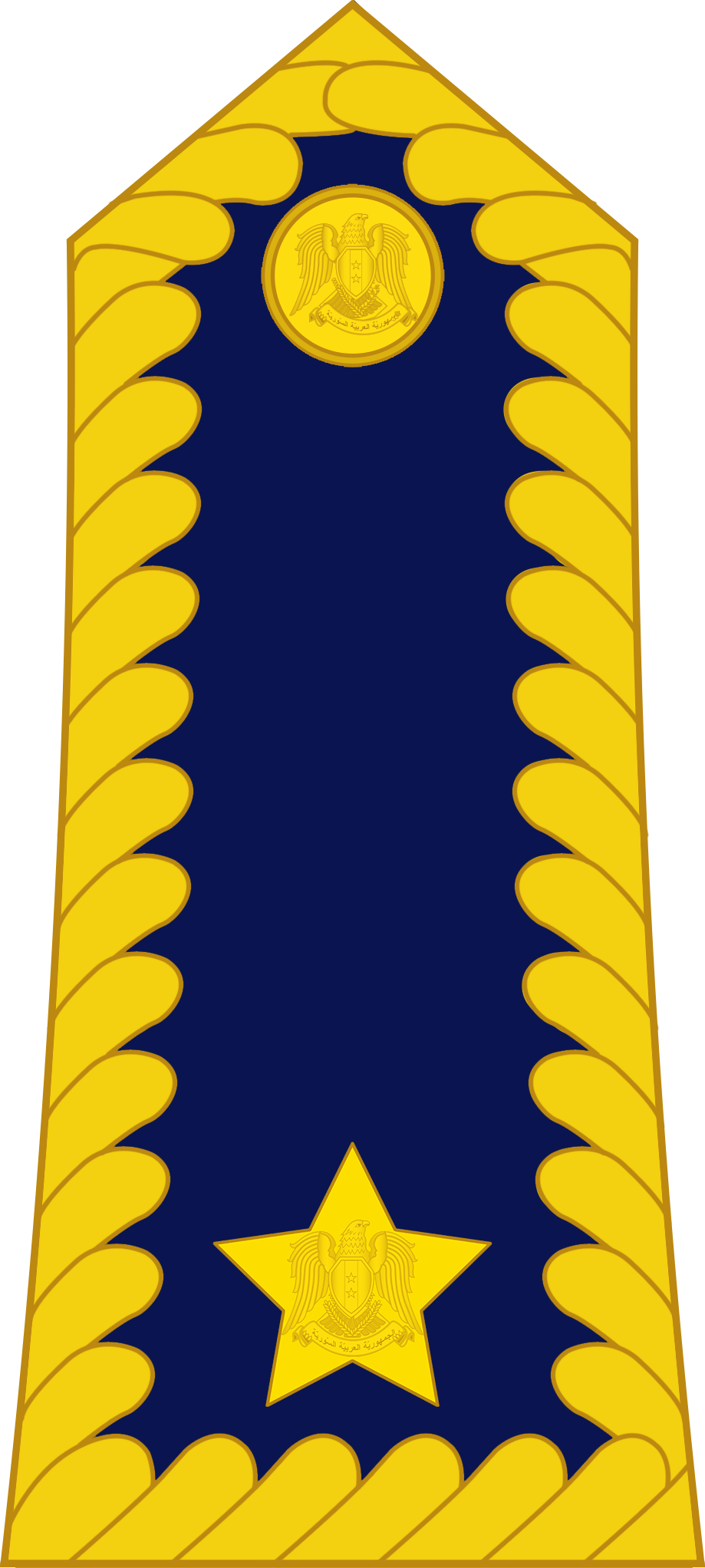
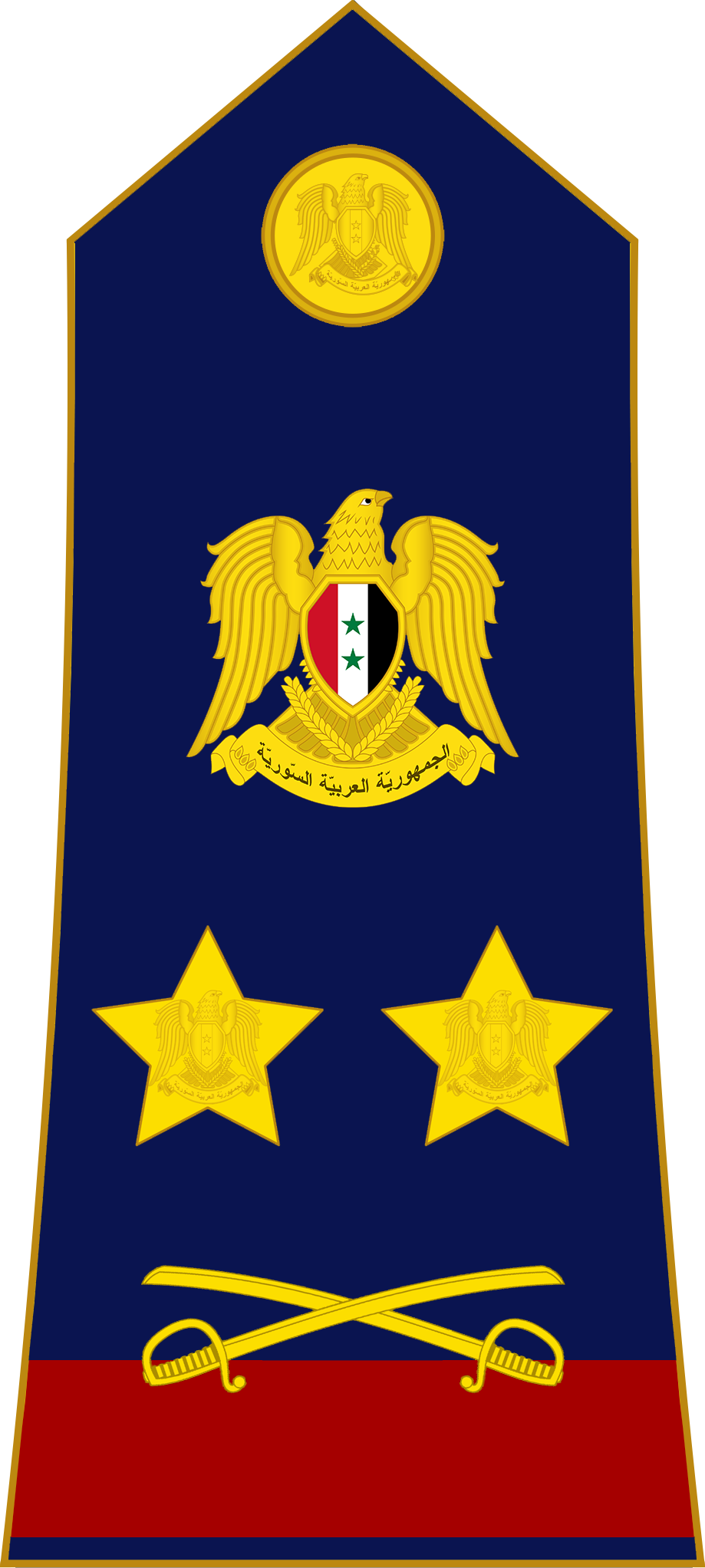
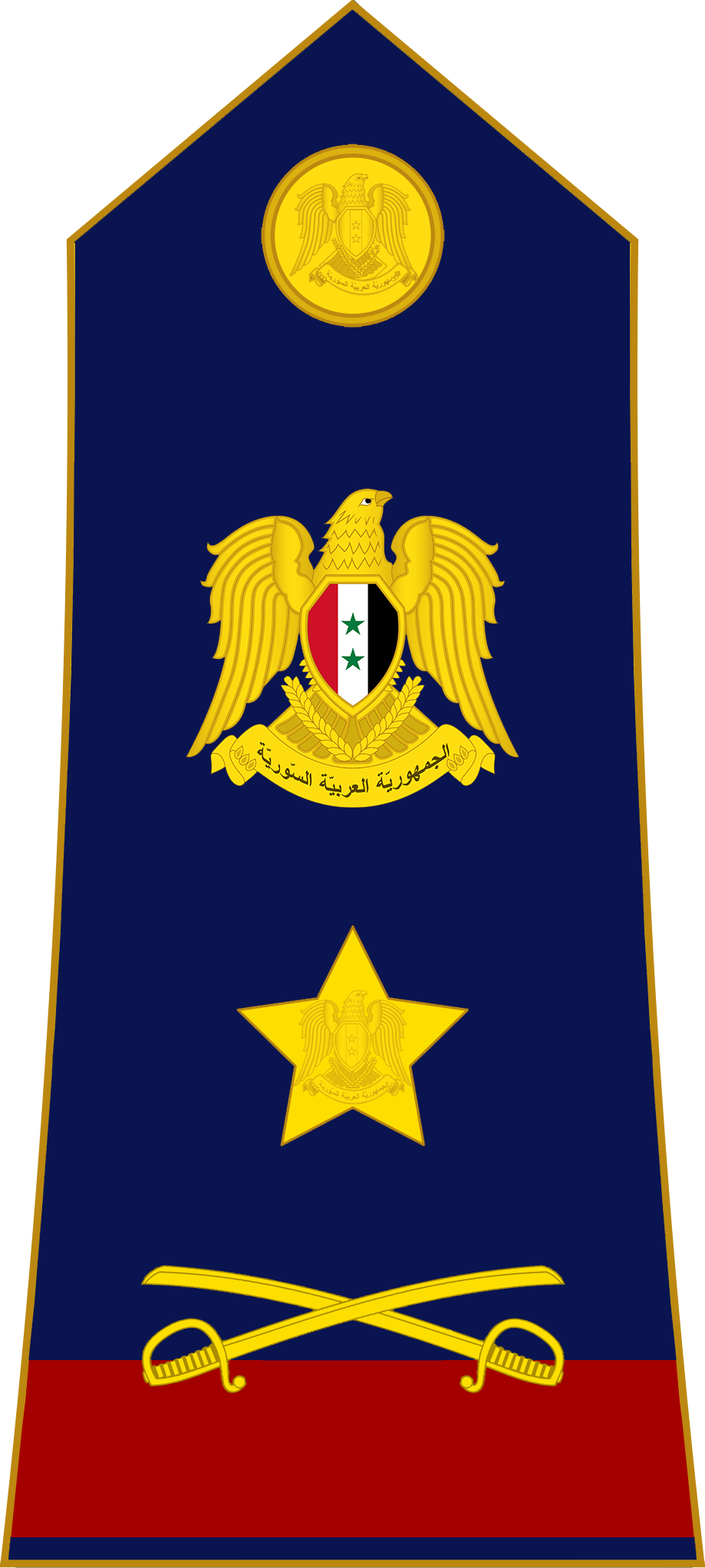
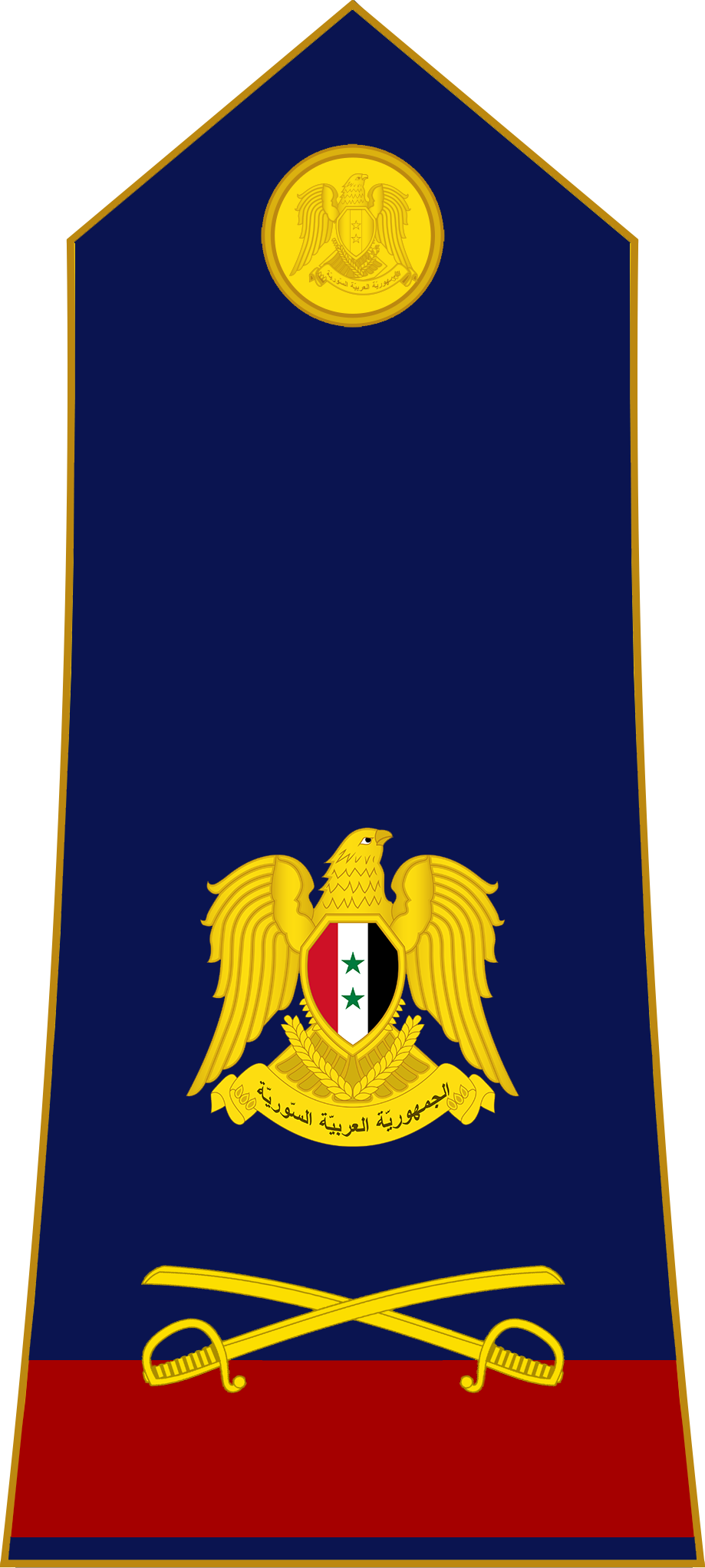
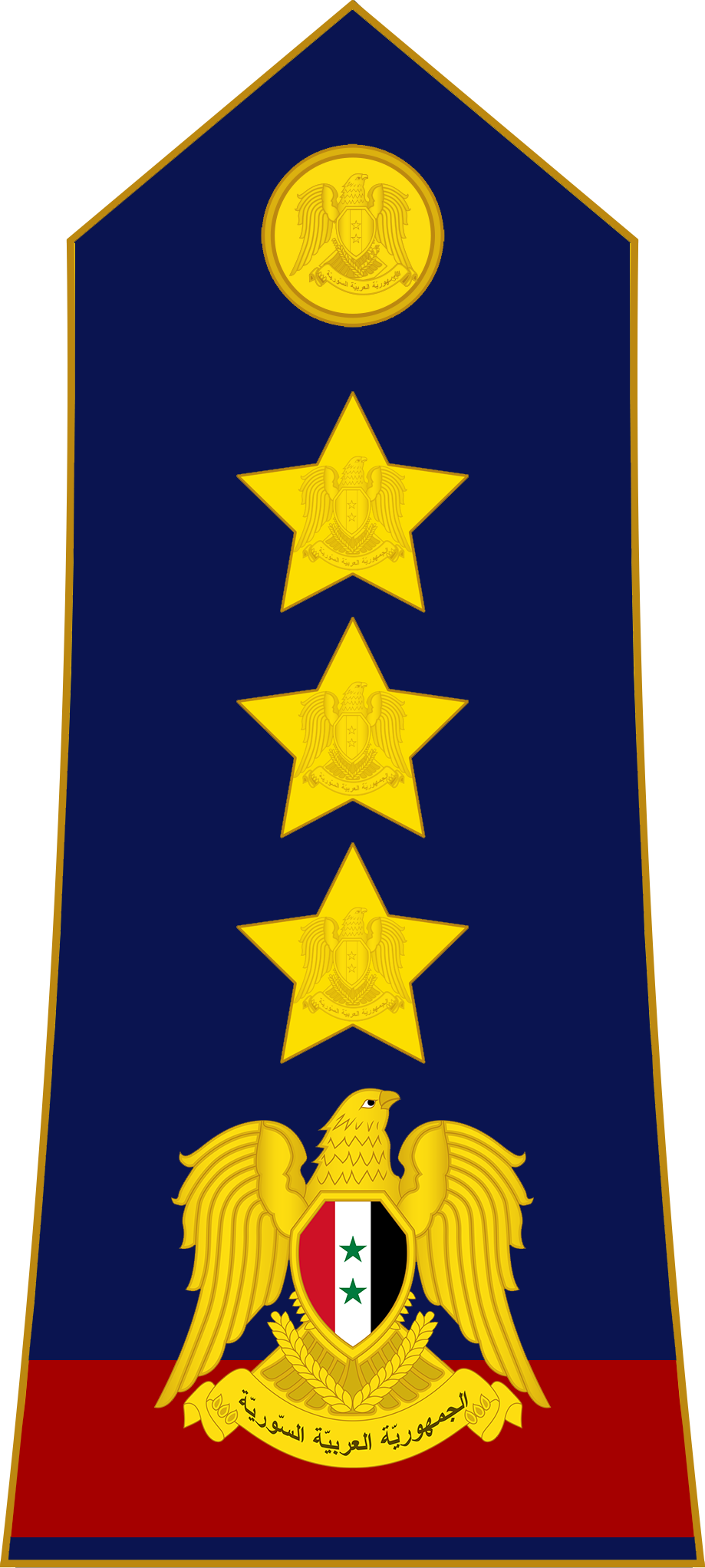
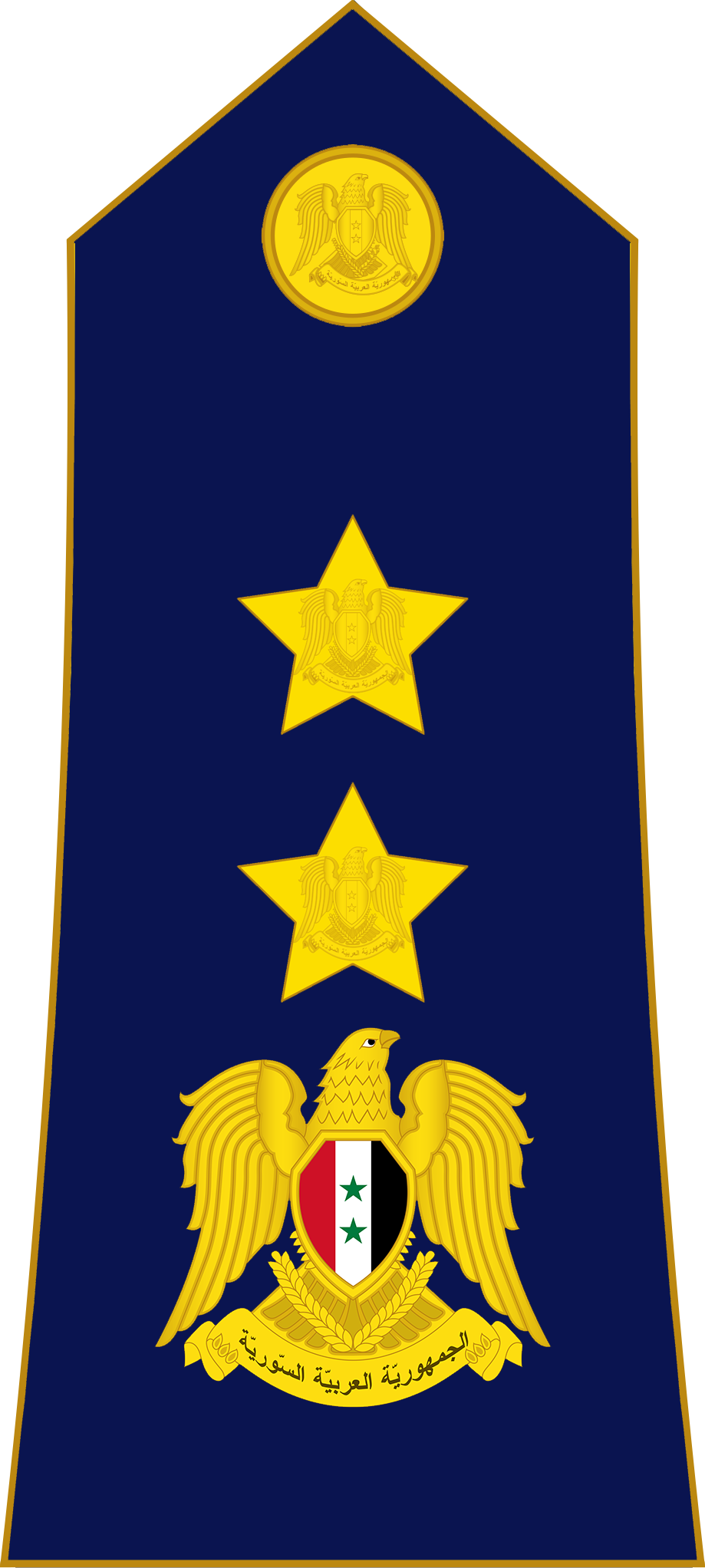
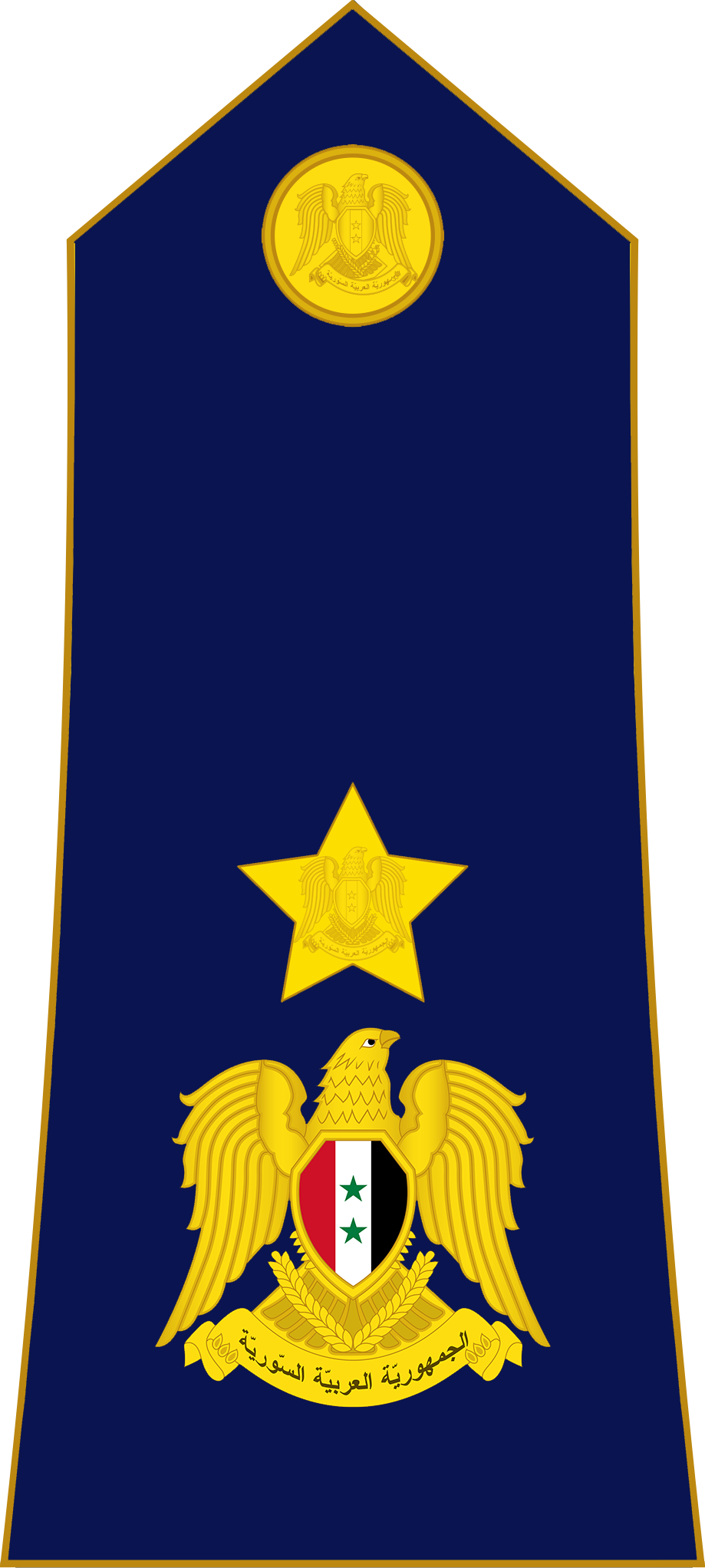
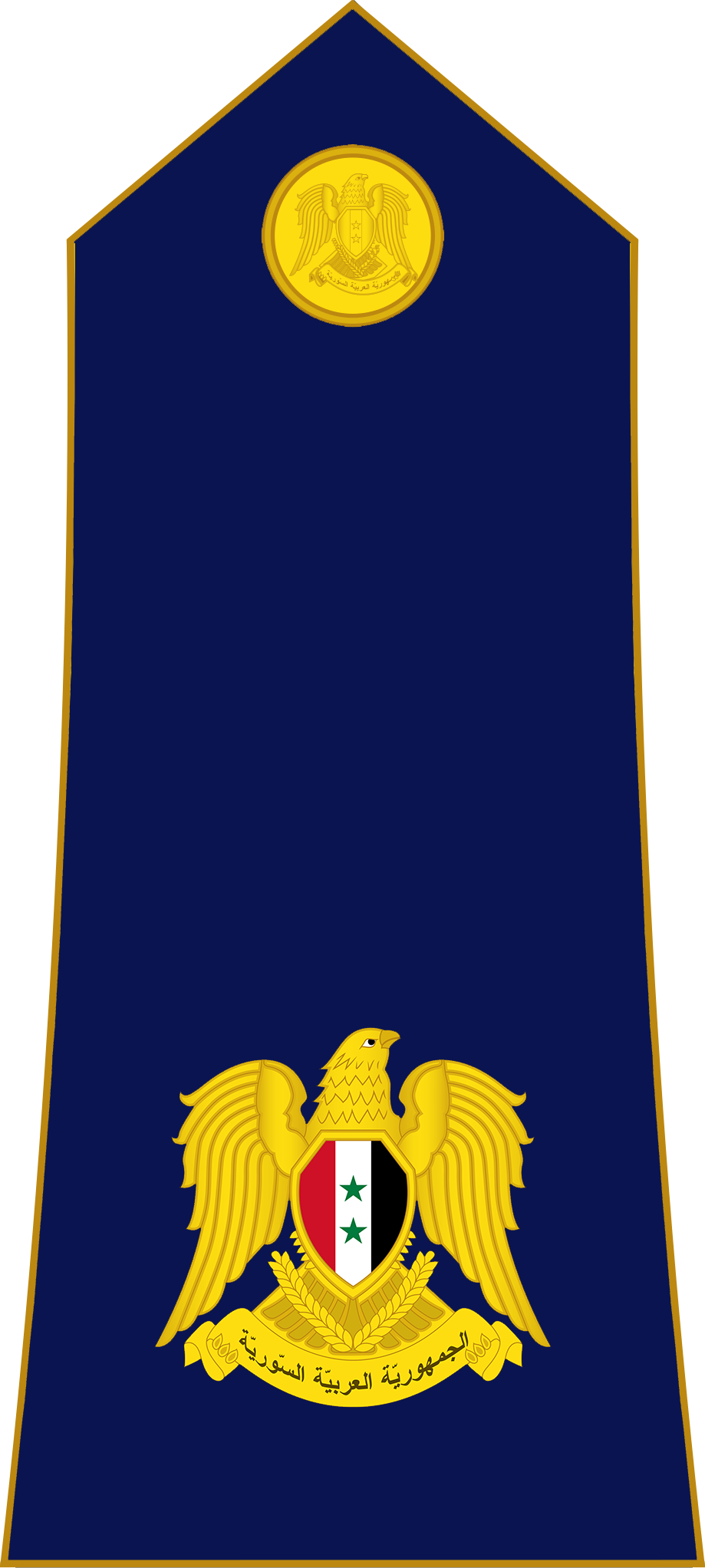
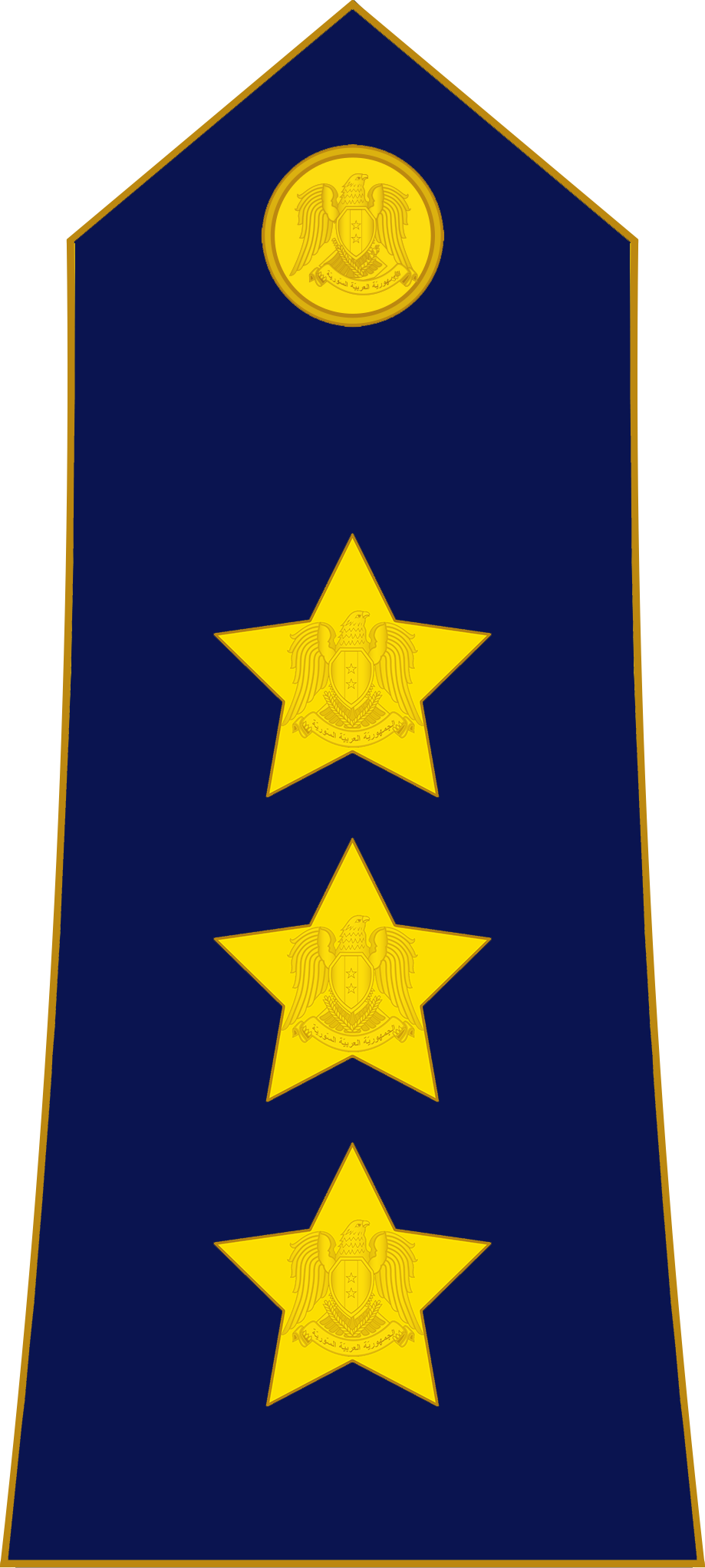
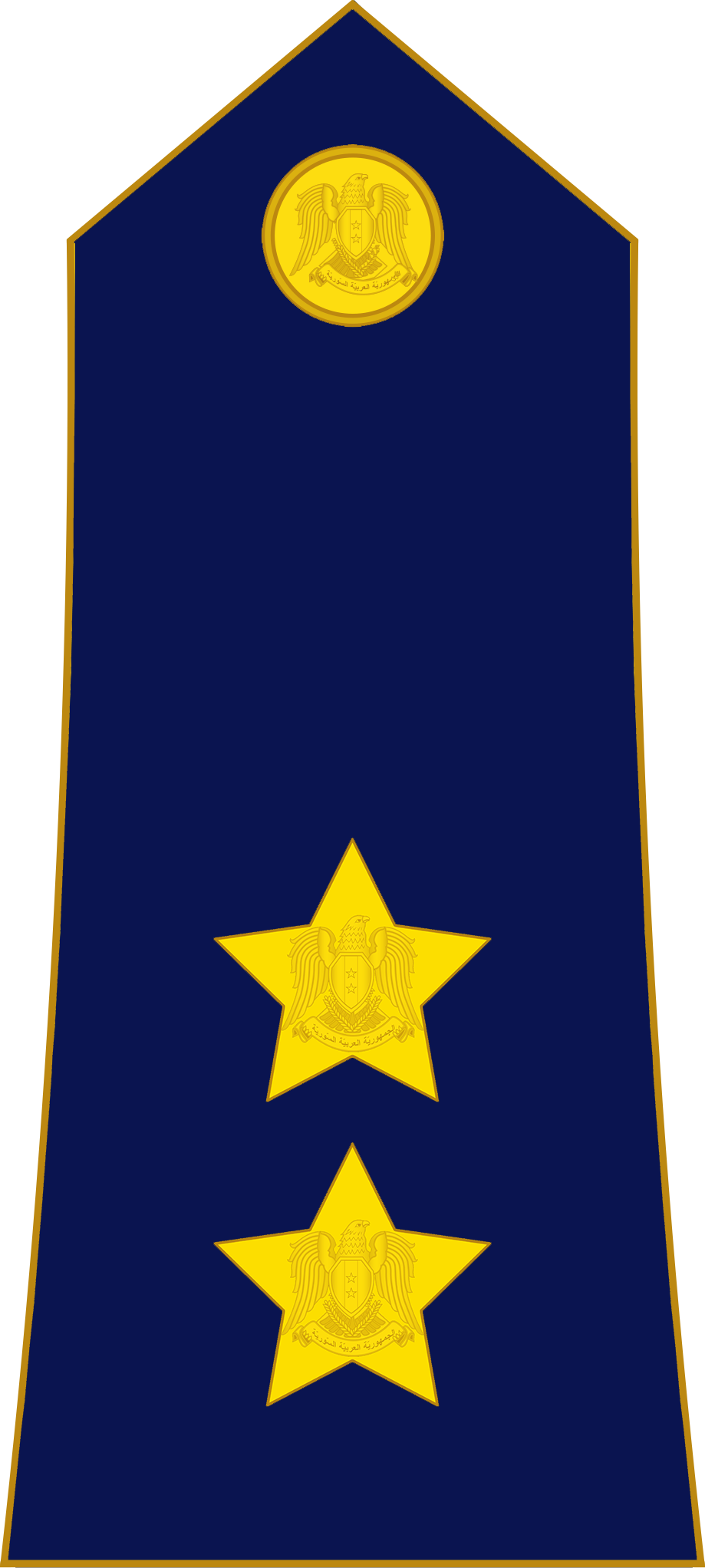
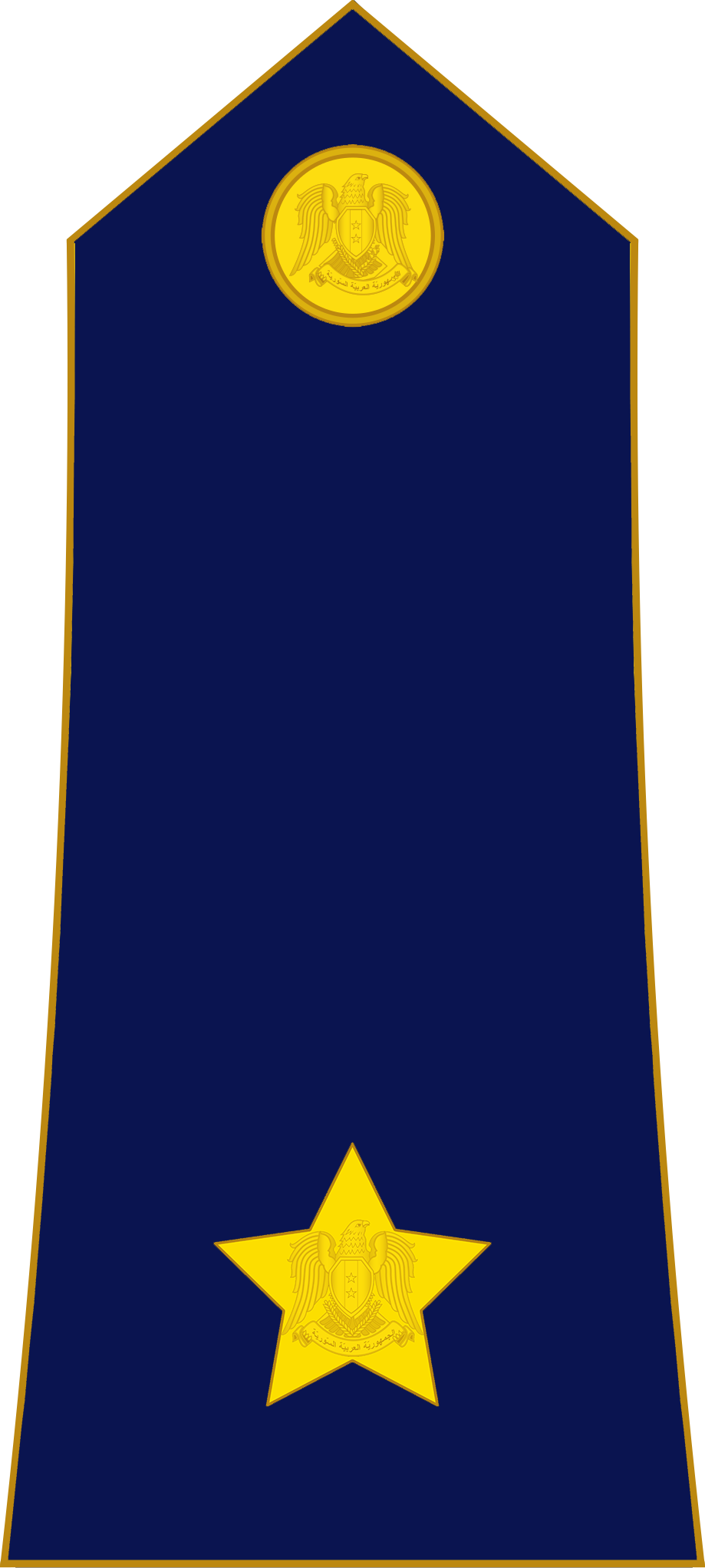
Rank group	General / flag officers					Senior officers			Junior officers
Rank	فريق	عماد أول	عماد	لواء	عميد	عقيد	مقدم	رائد	نقيب	ملازم أول	ملازم
Romanization	Fariq	Eimad 'awal	Eimad	Alliwa'	Amid	Aqid	Muqaddam	Ra'id	Naqib	Mulazim awwal	Mulazim
Joint combat uniform (c. 1981–2024)
Army full dress uniform (1963–2024)
Army service dress uniform (1963–2024)
Navy full dress uniform (1963–2024)
Navy service dress uniform (1963–2024)
Air force full dress uniform (1963–2024)
Air force service dress uniform (1963–2024)

=== Other ranks ===
The rank insignia of non-commissioned officers and enlisted personnel.

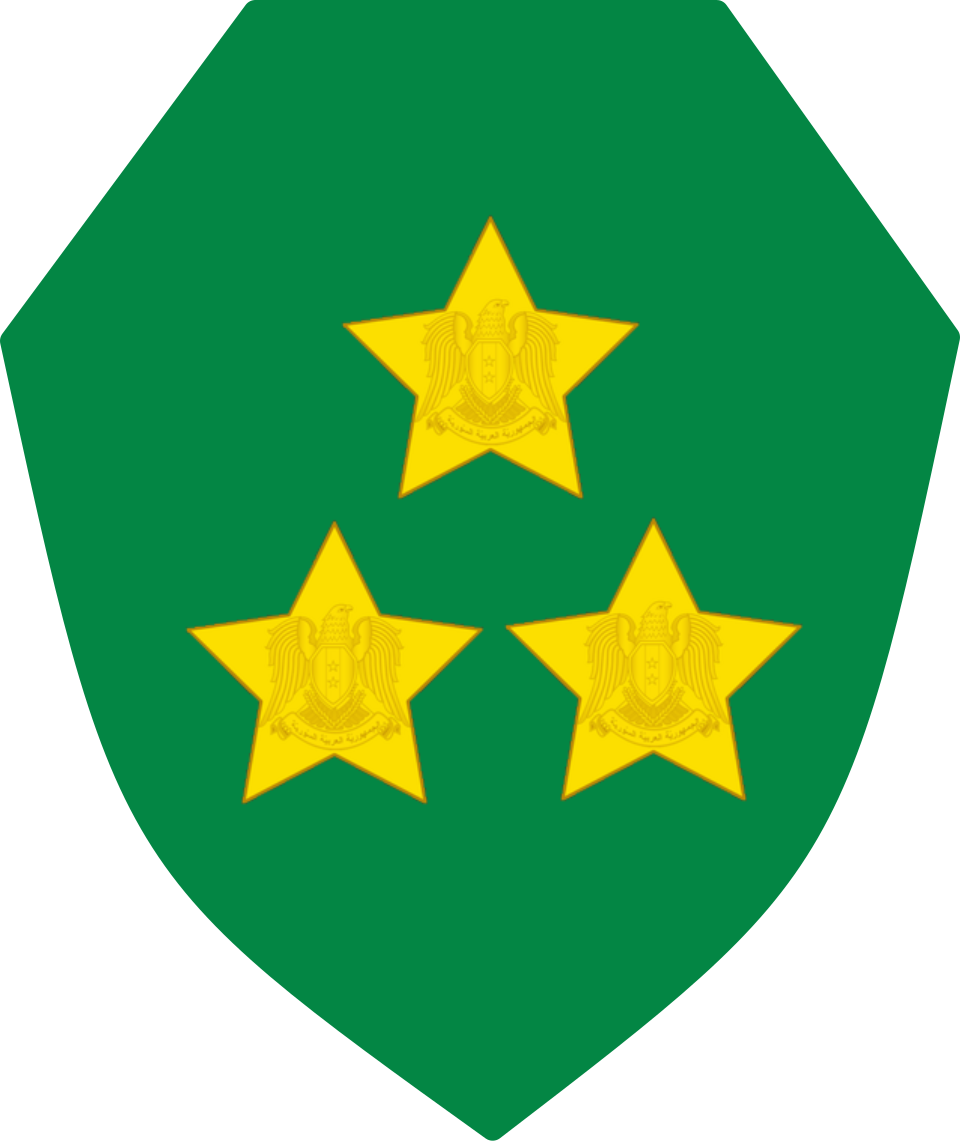
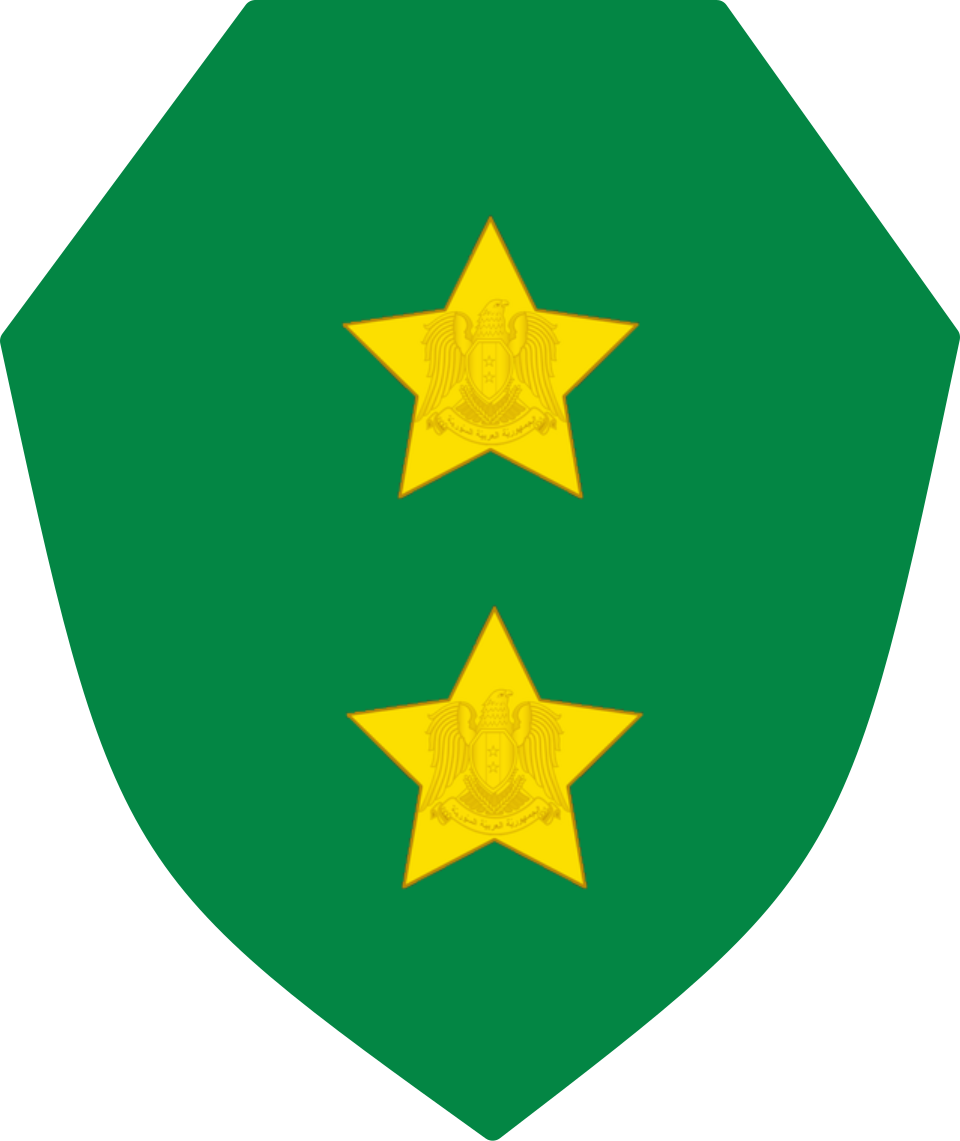
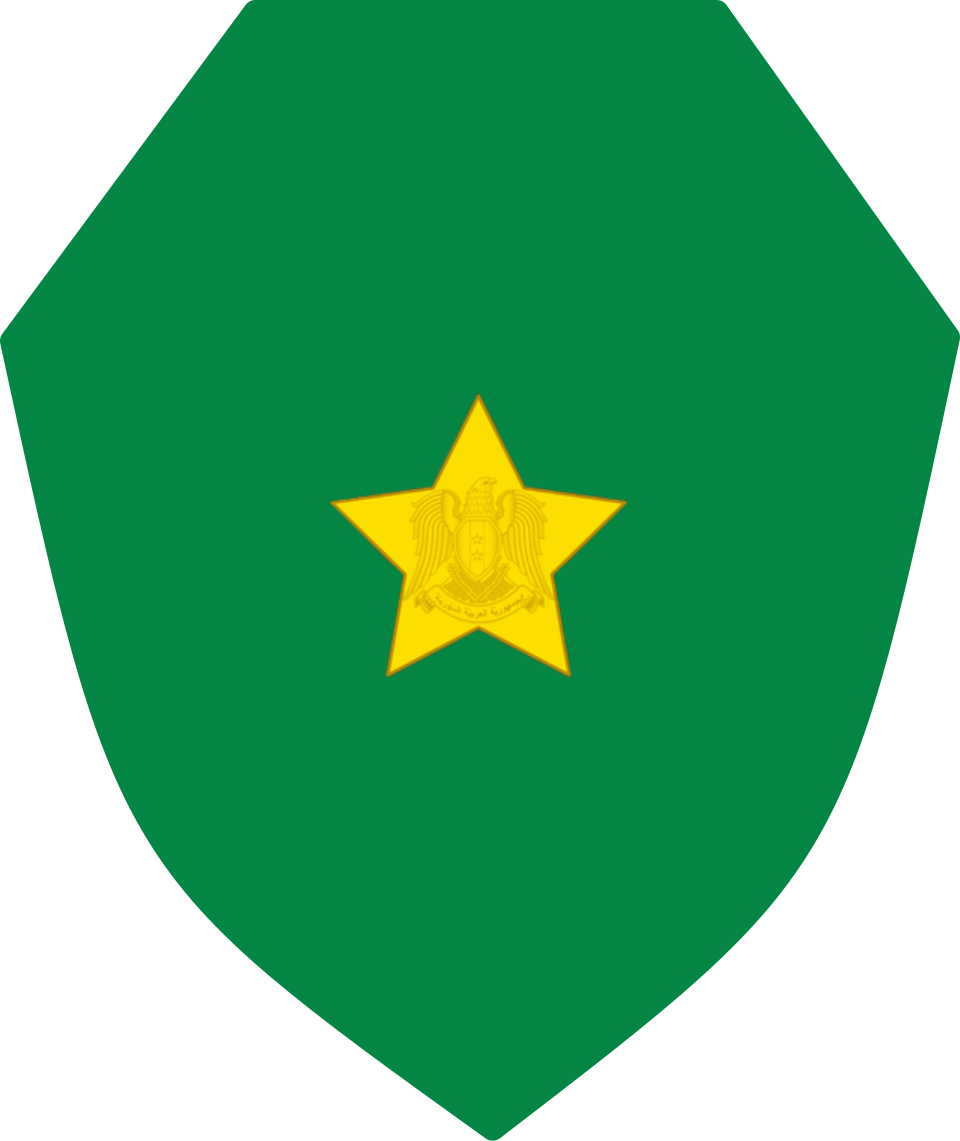
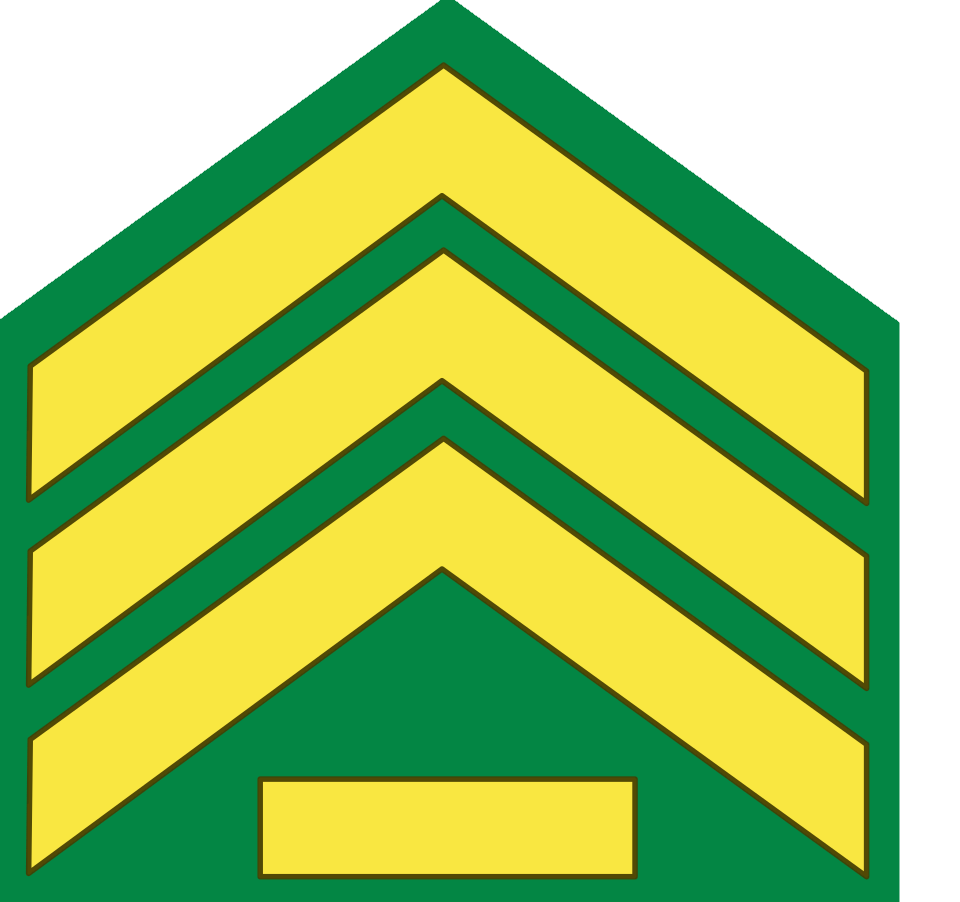
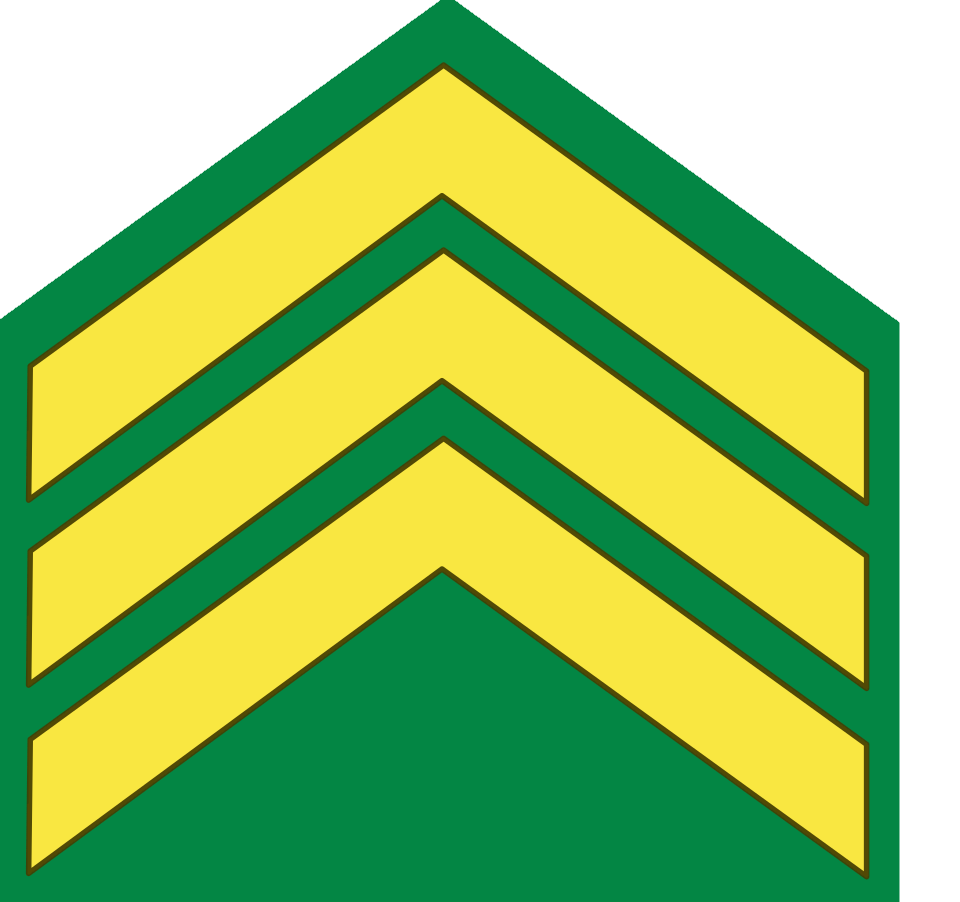
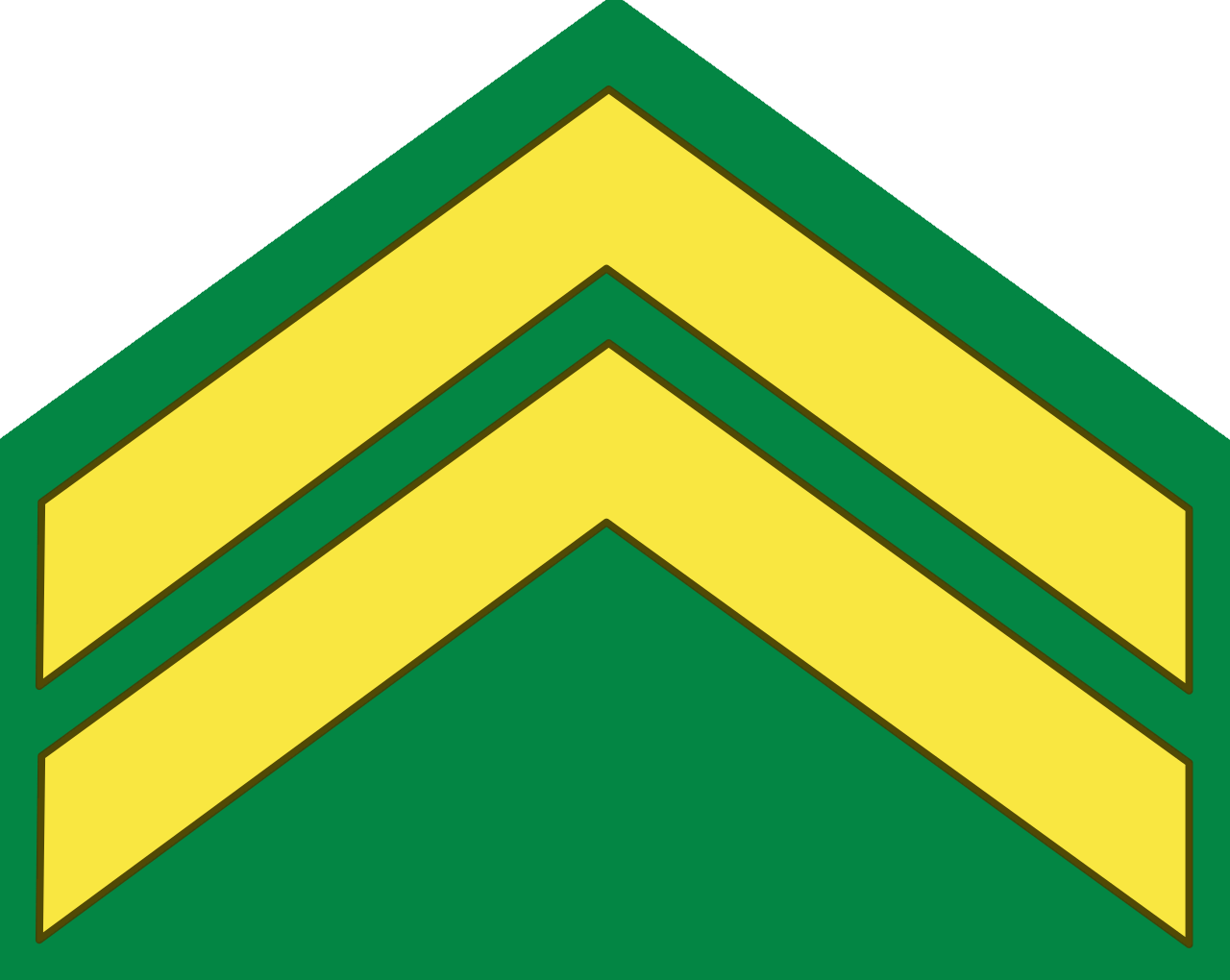
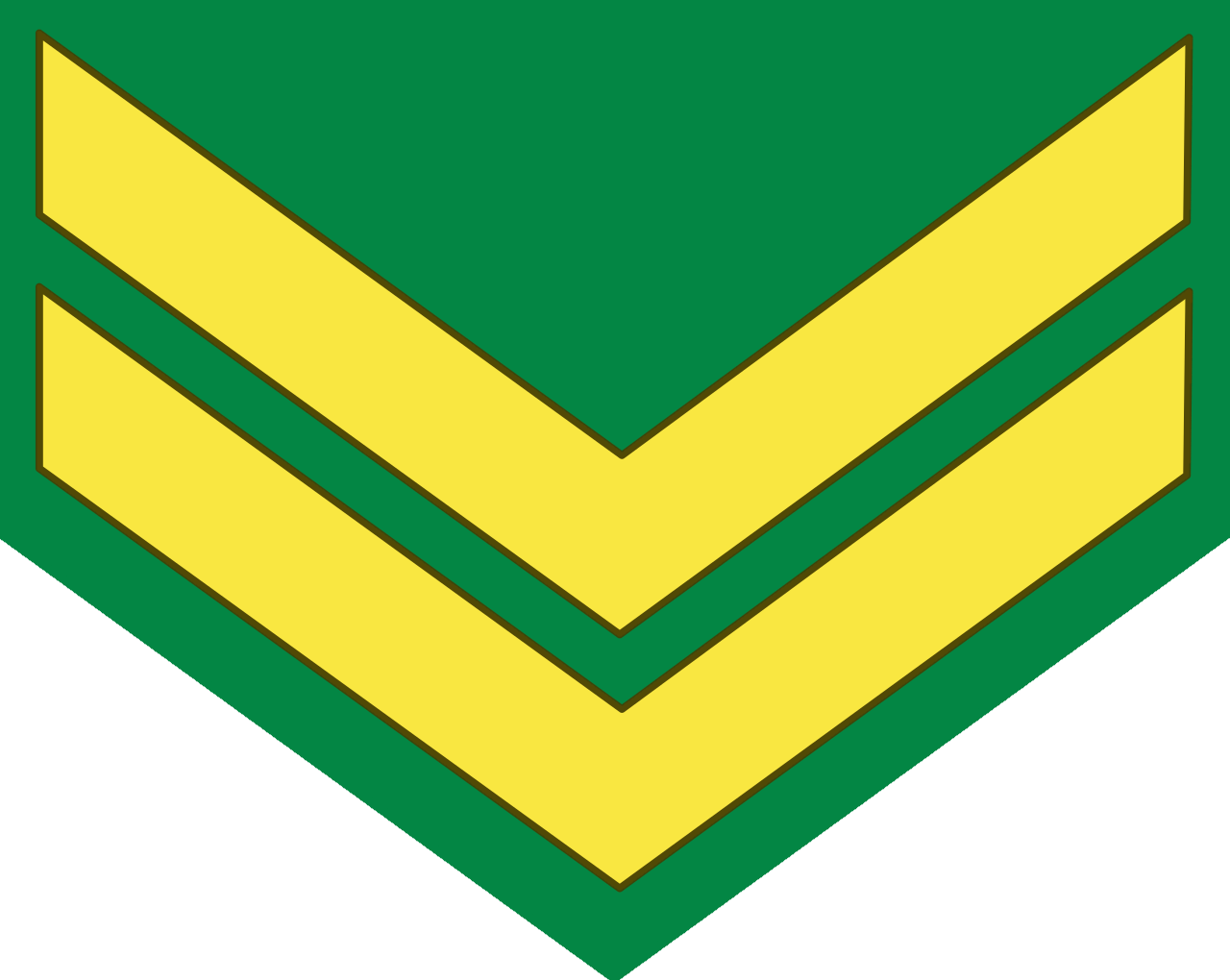
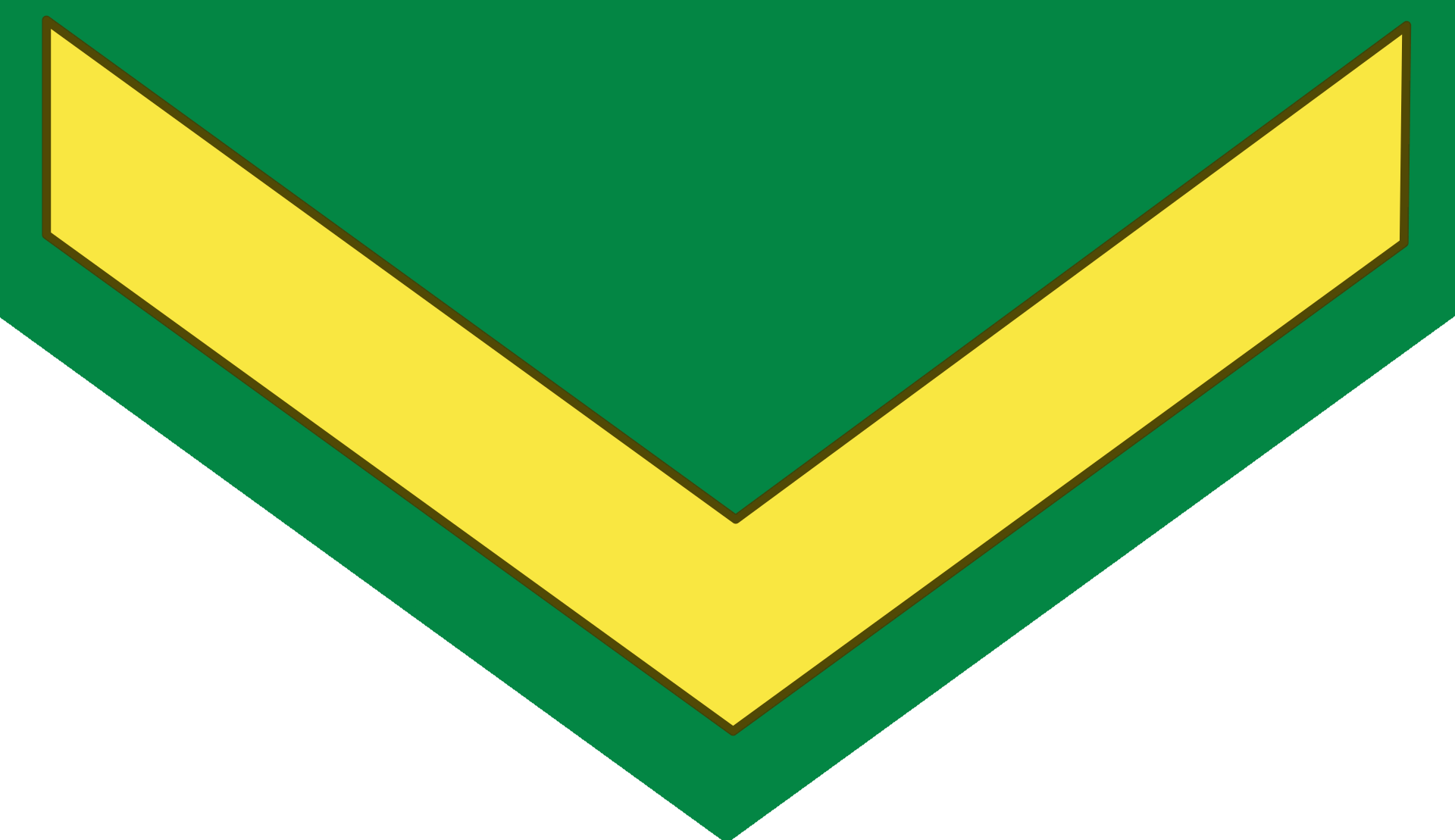
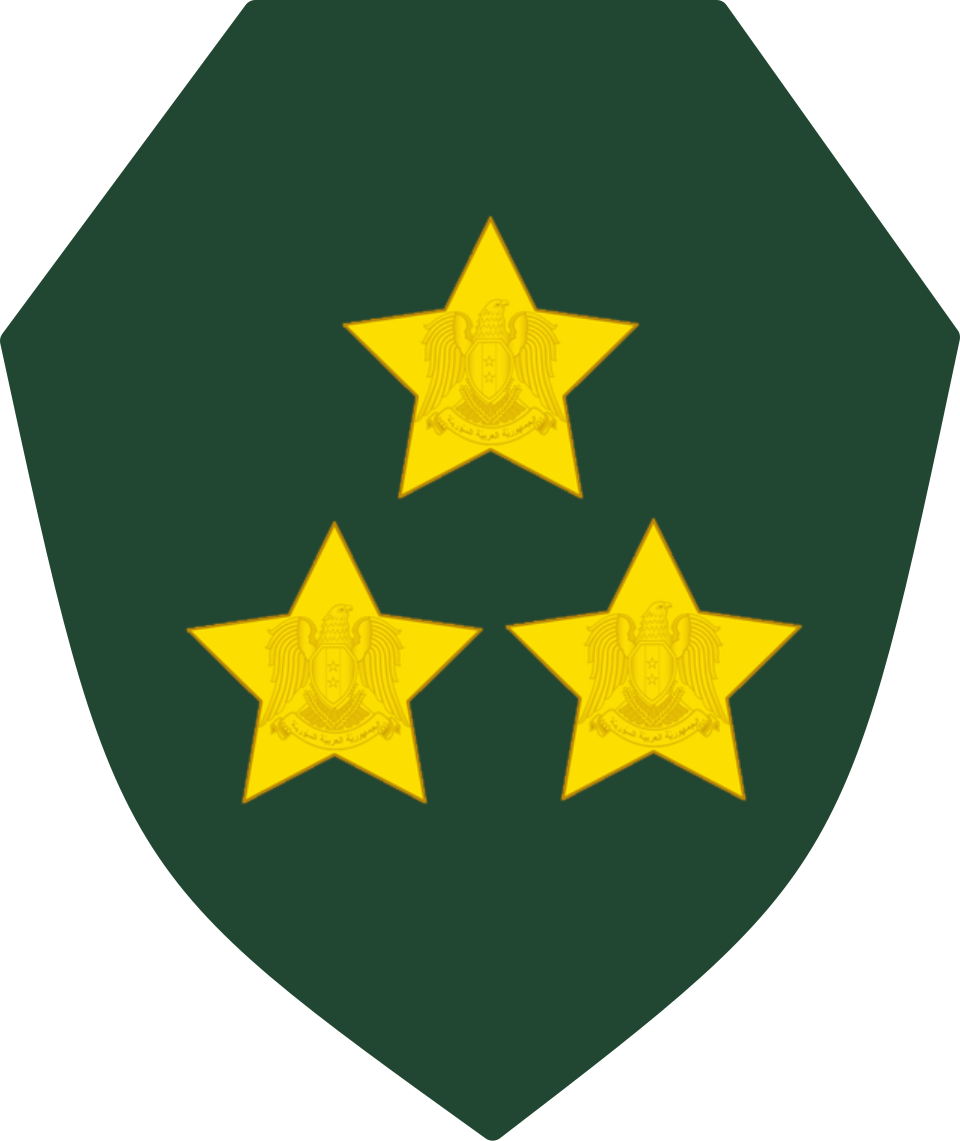
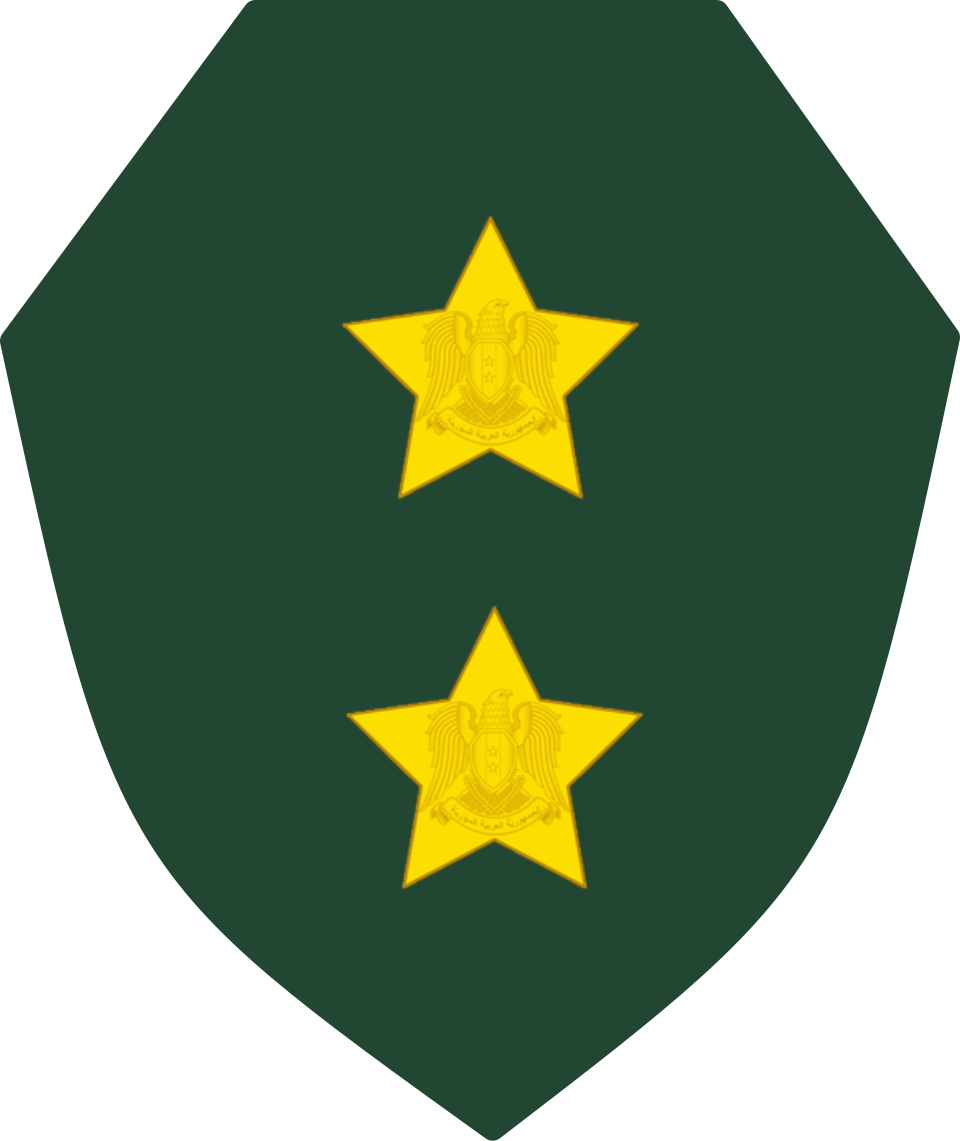
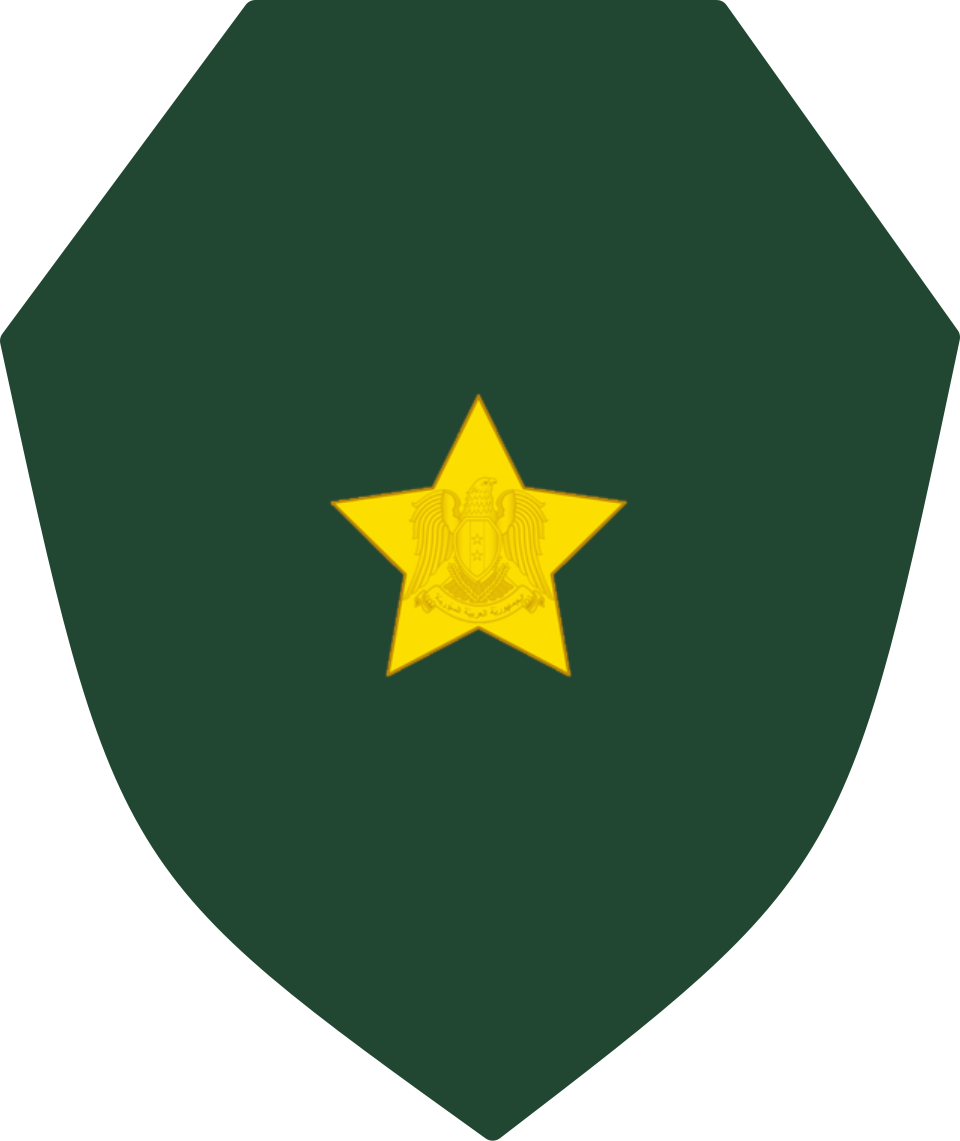
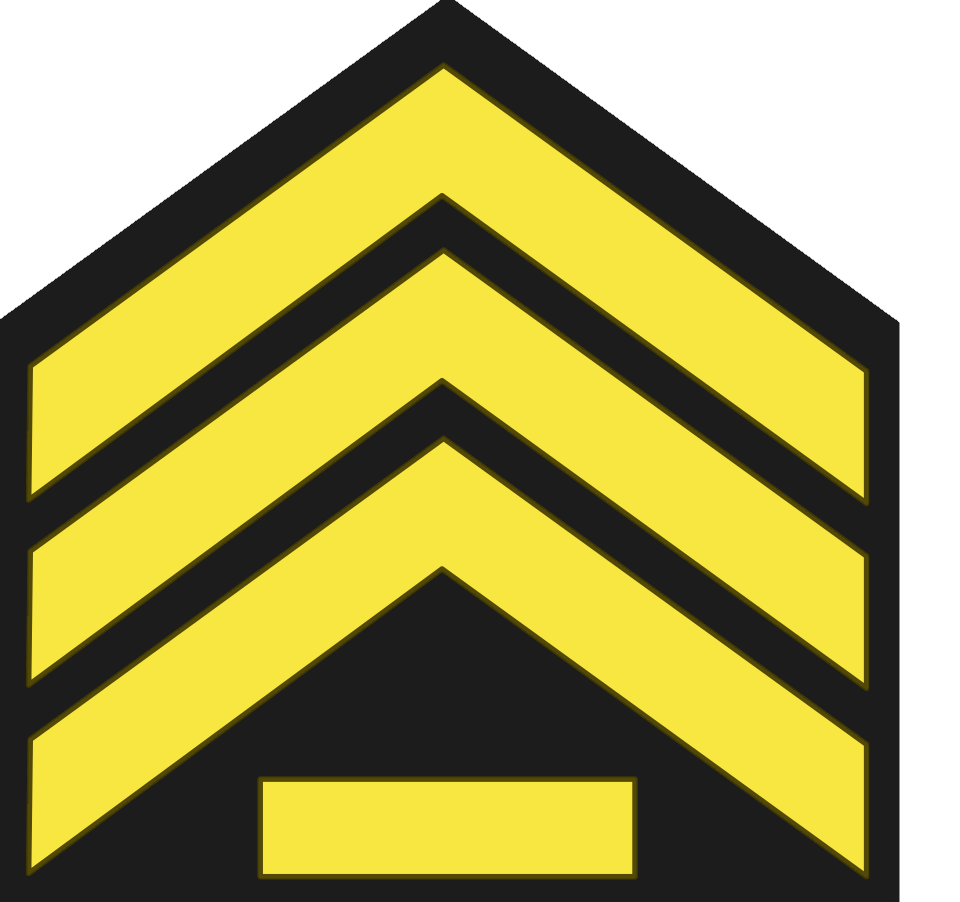
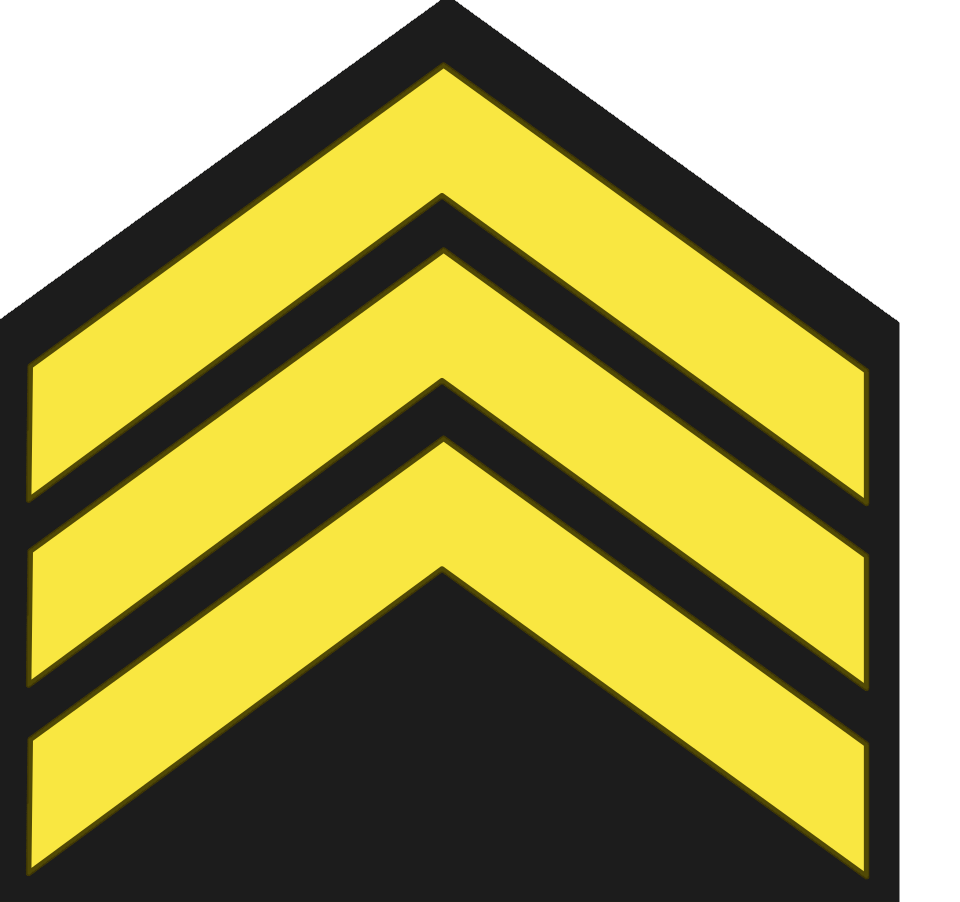
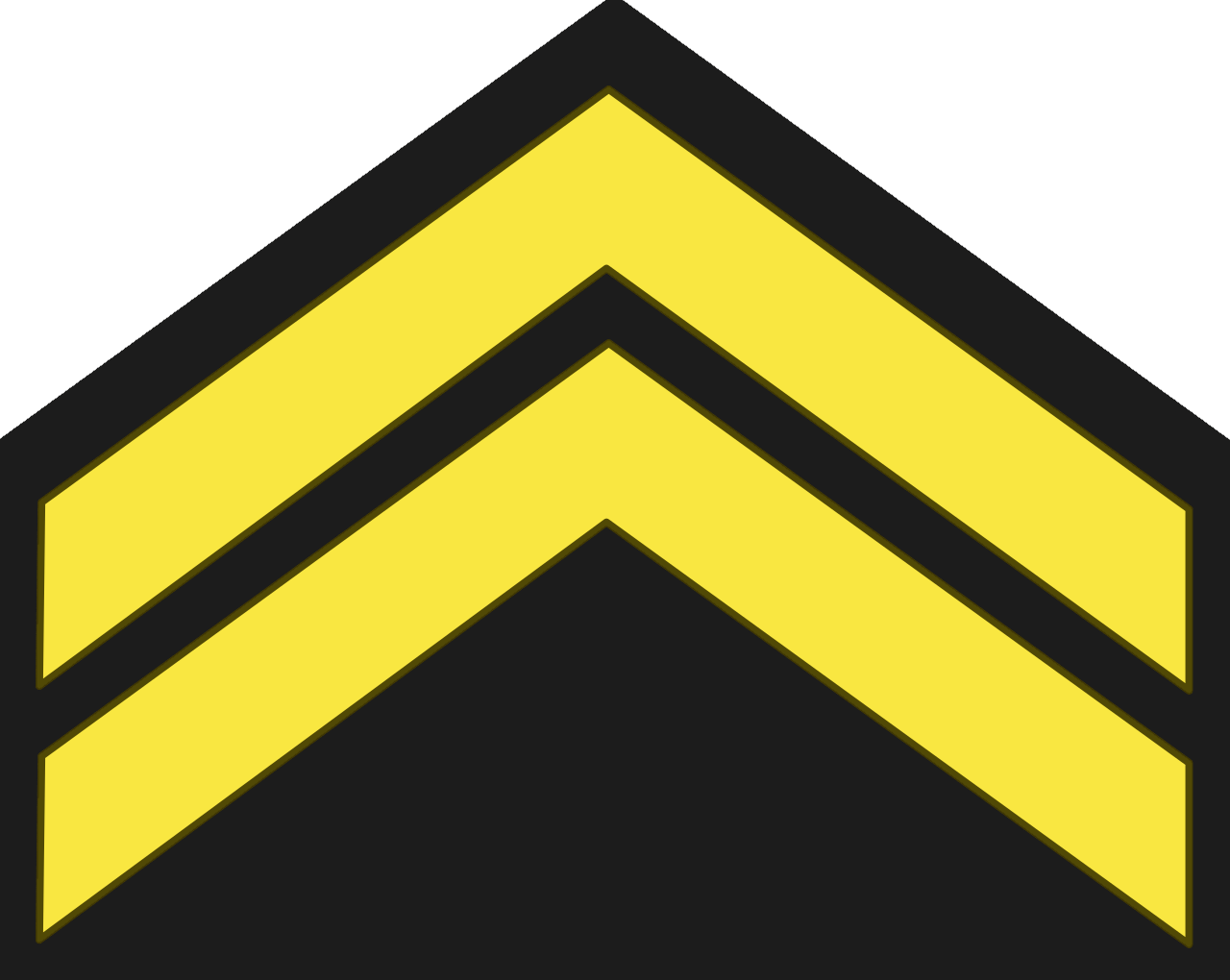
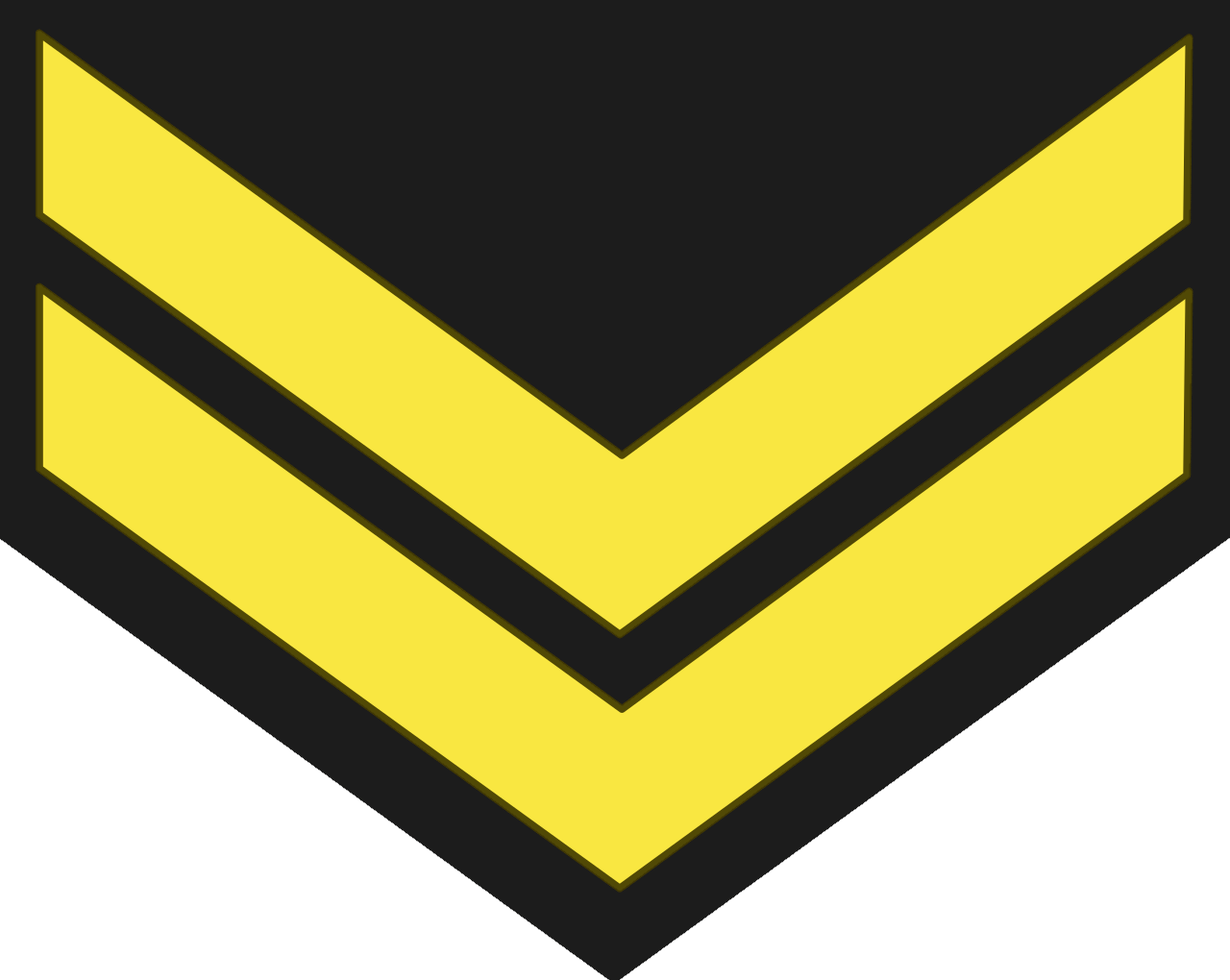
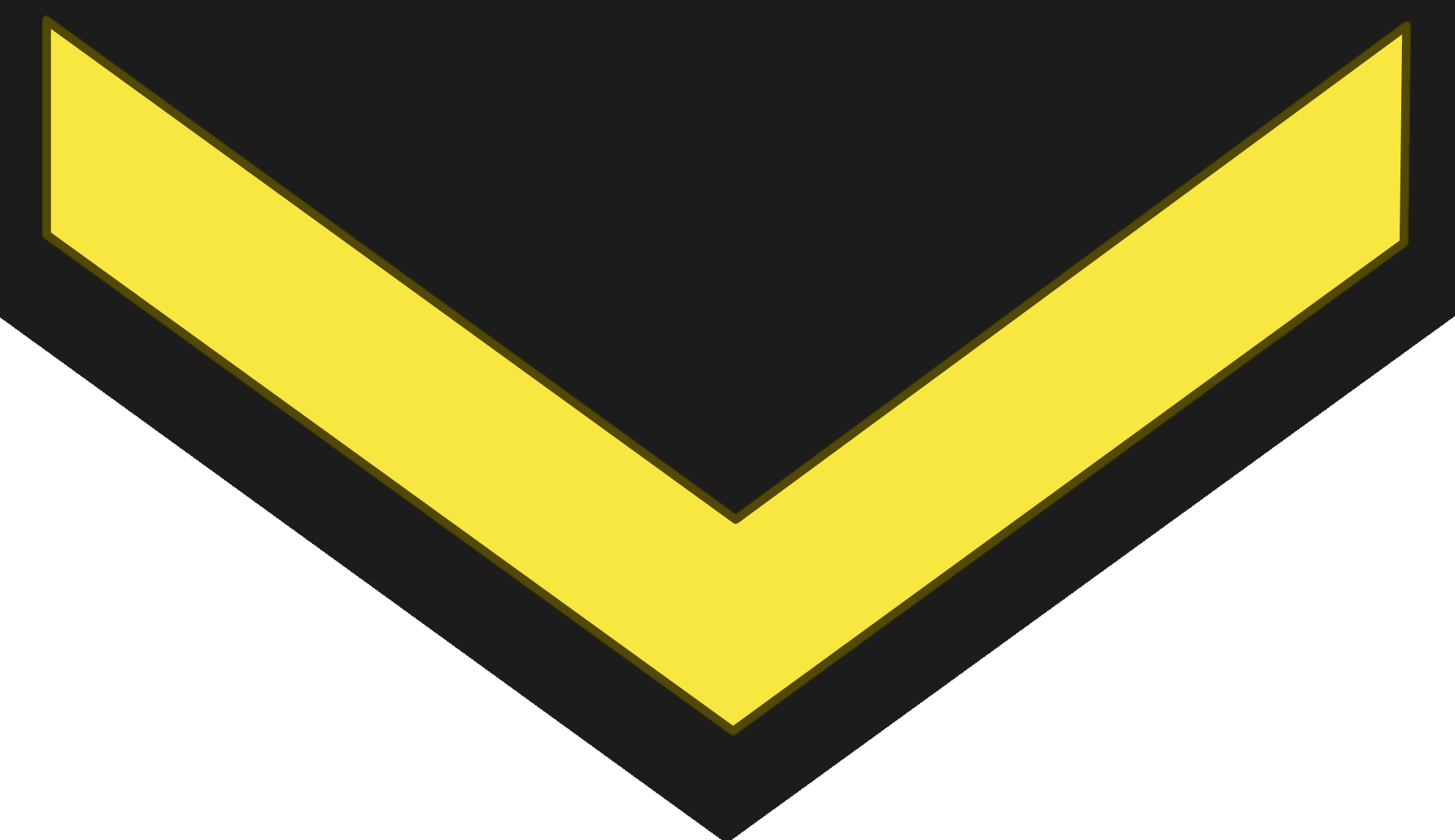
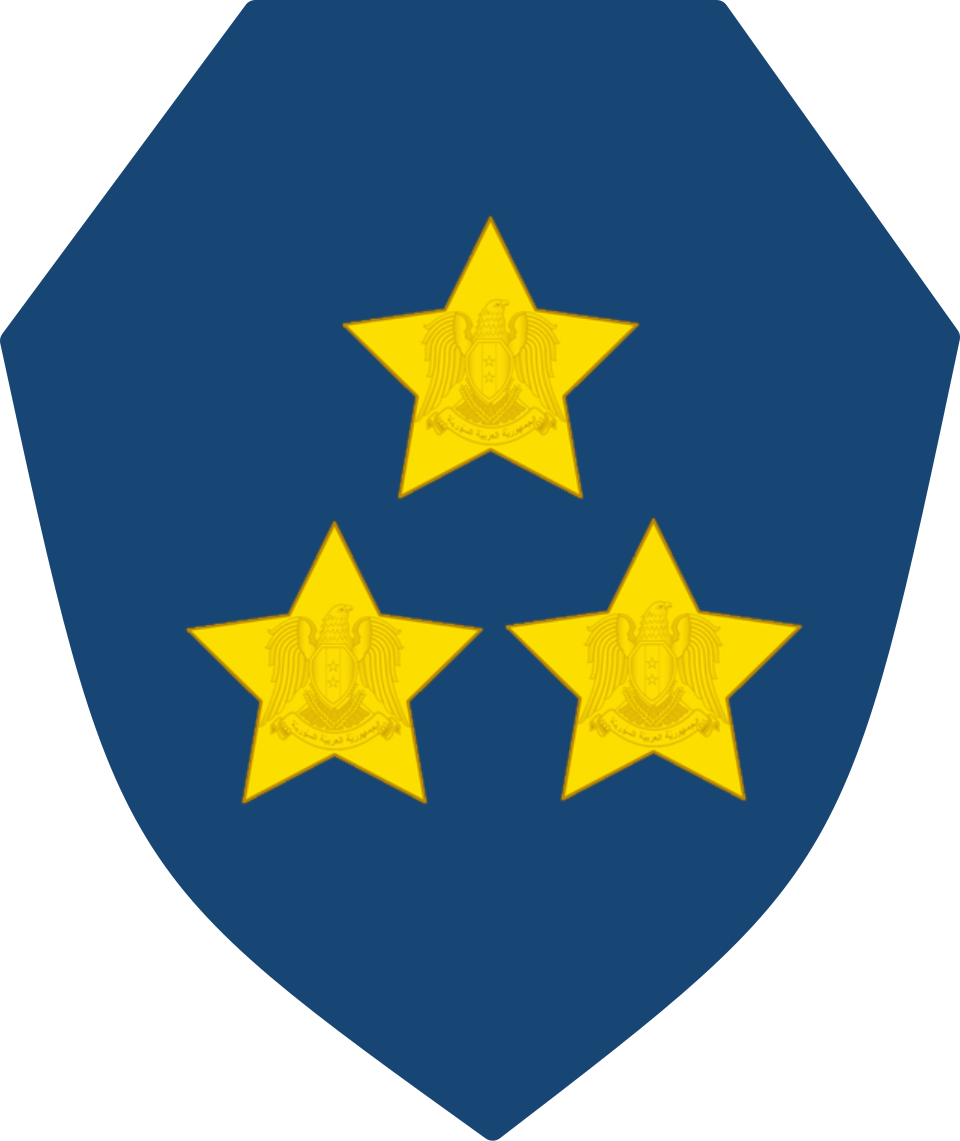
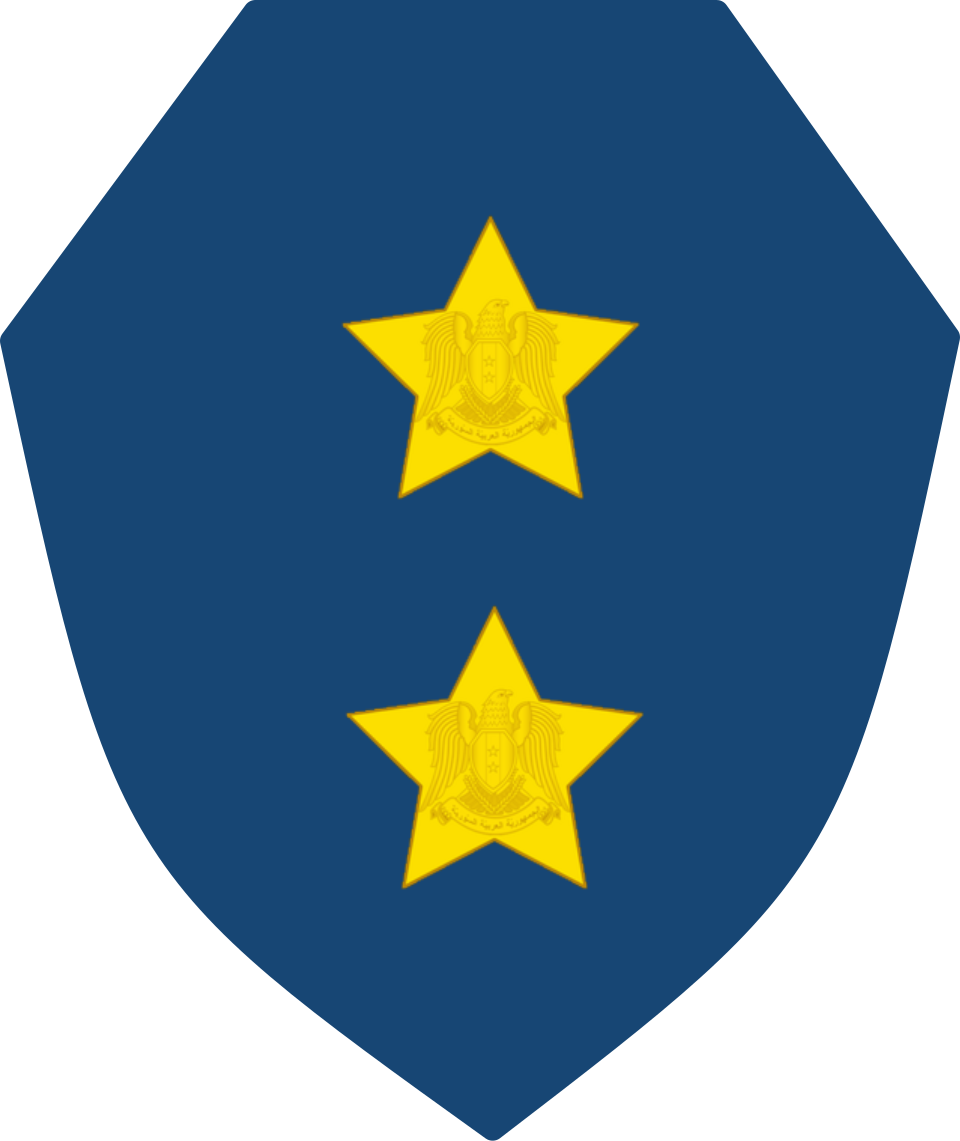
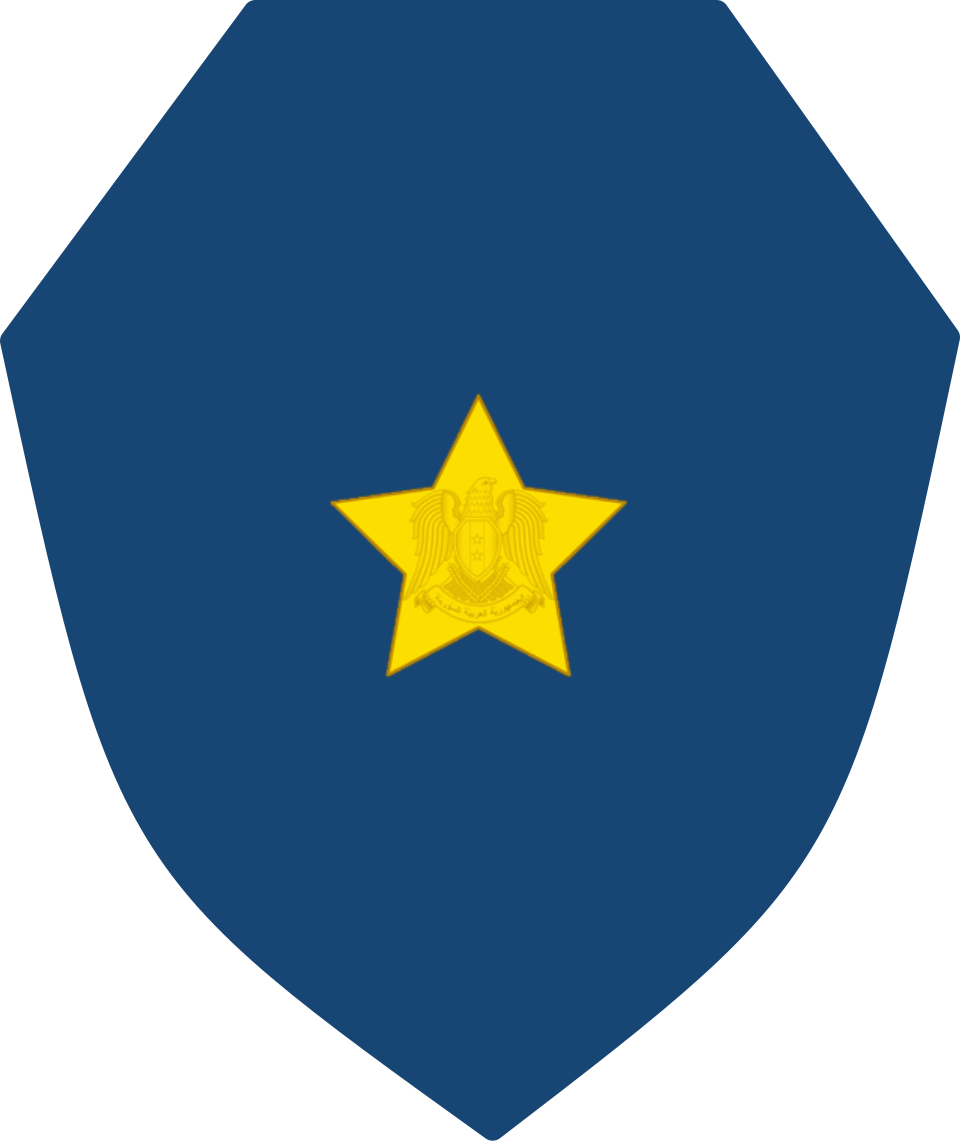
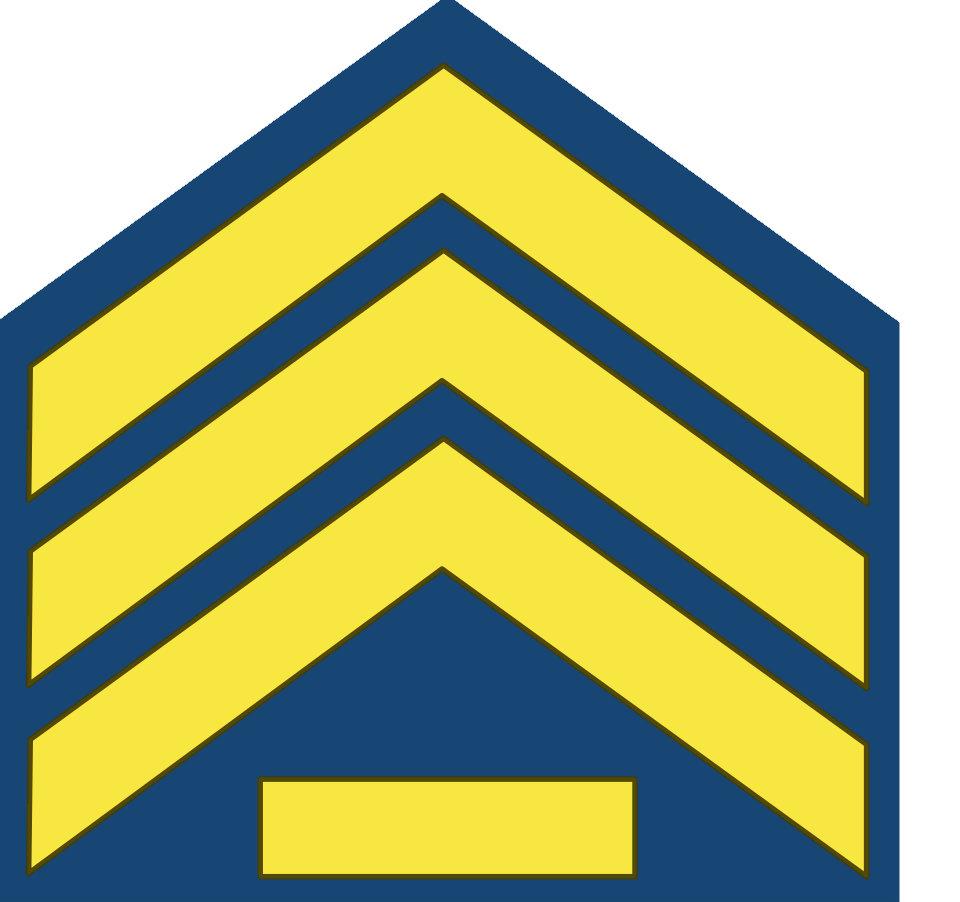
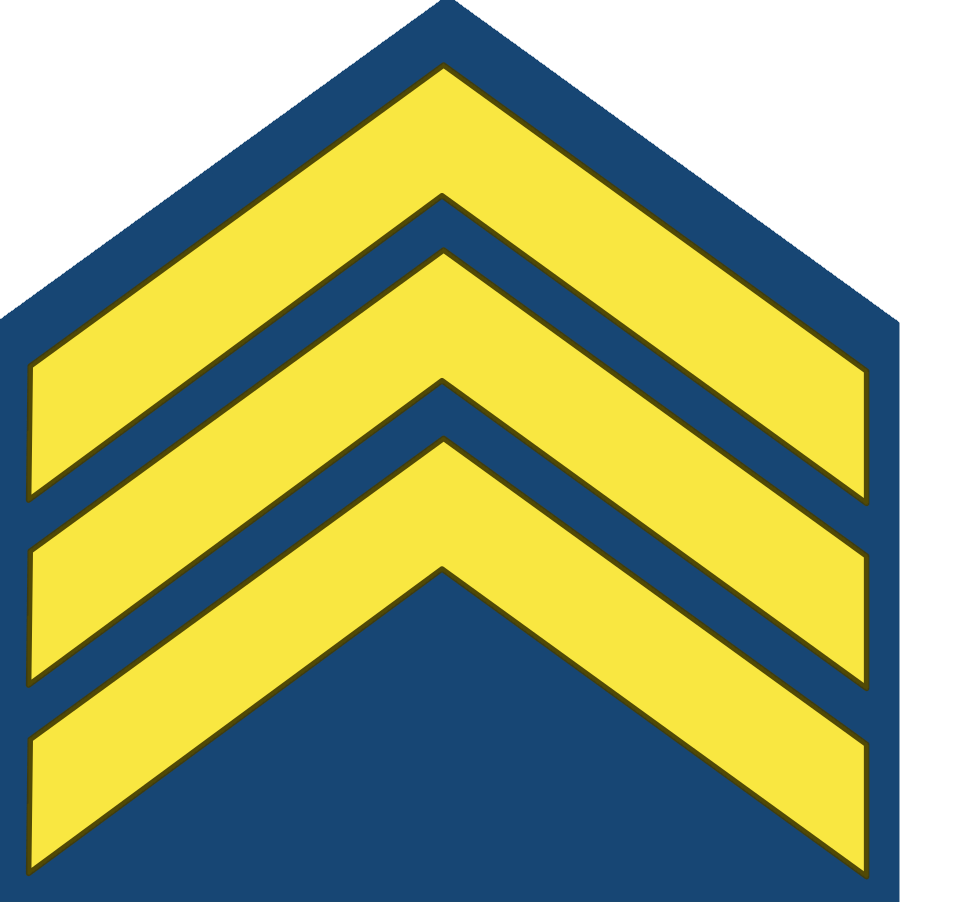
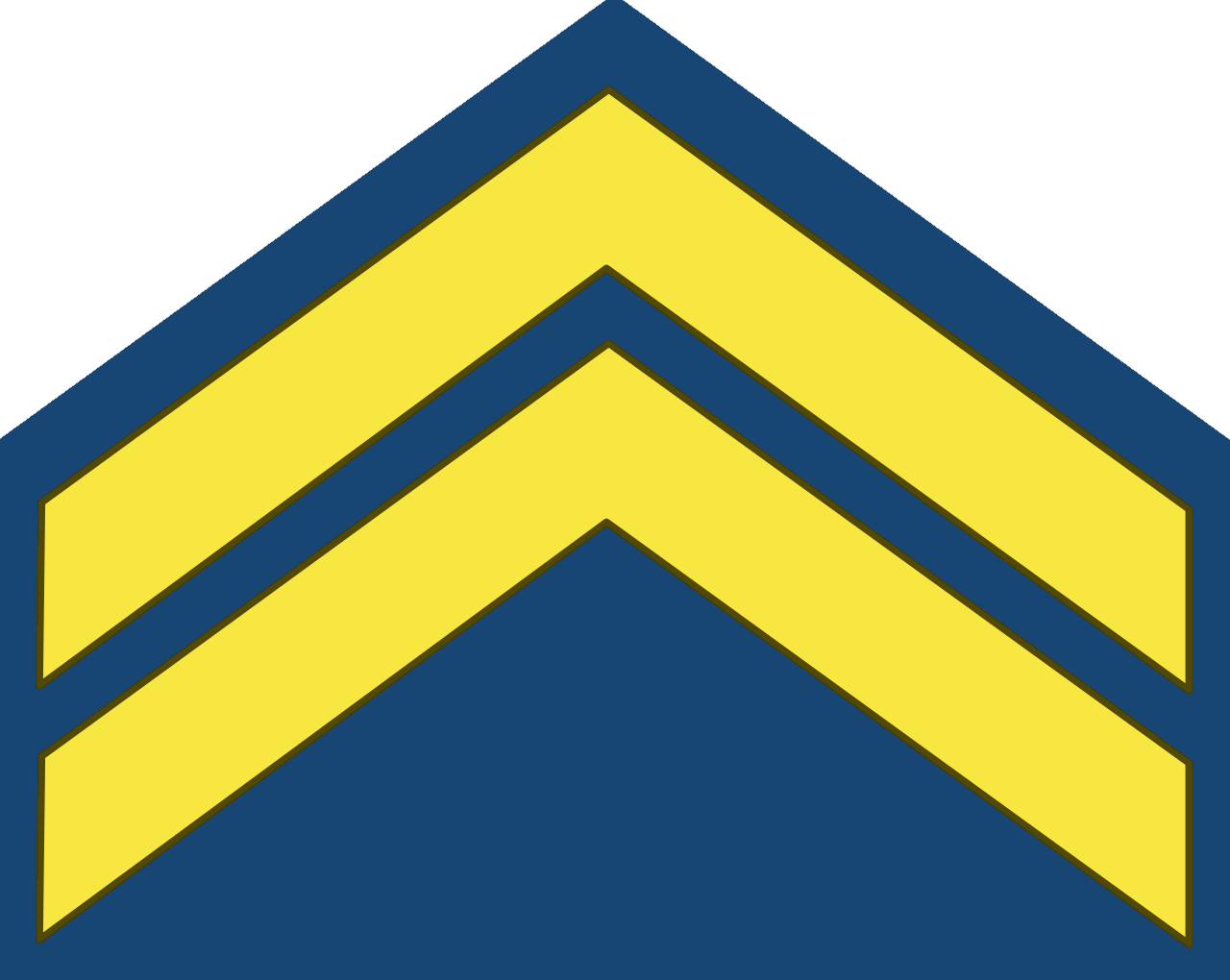
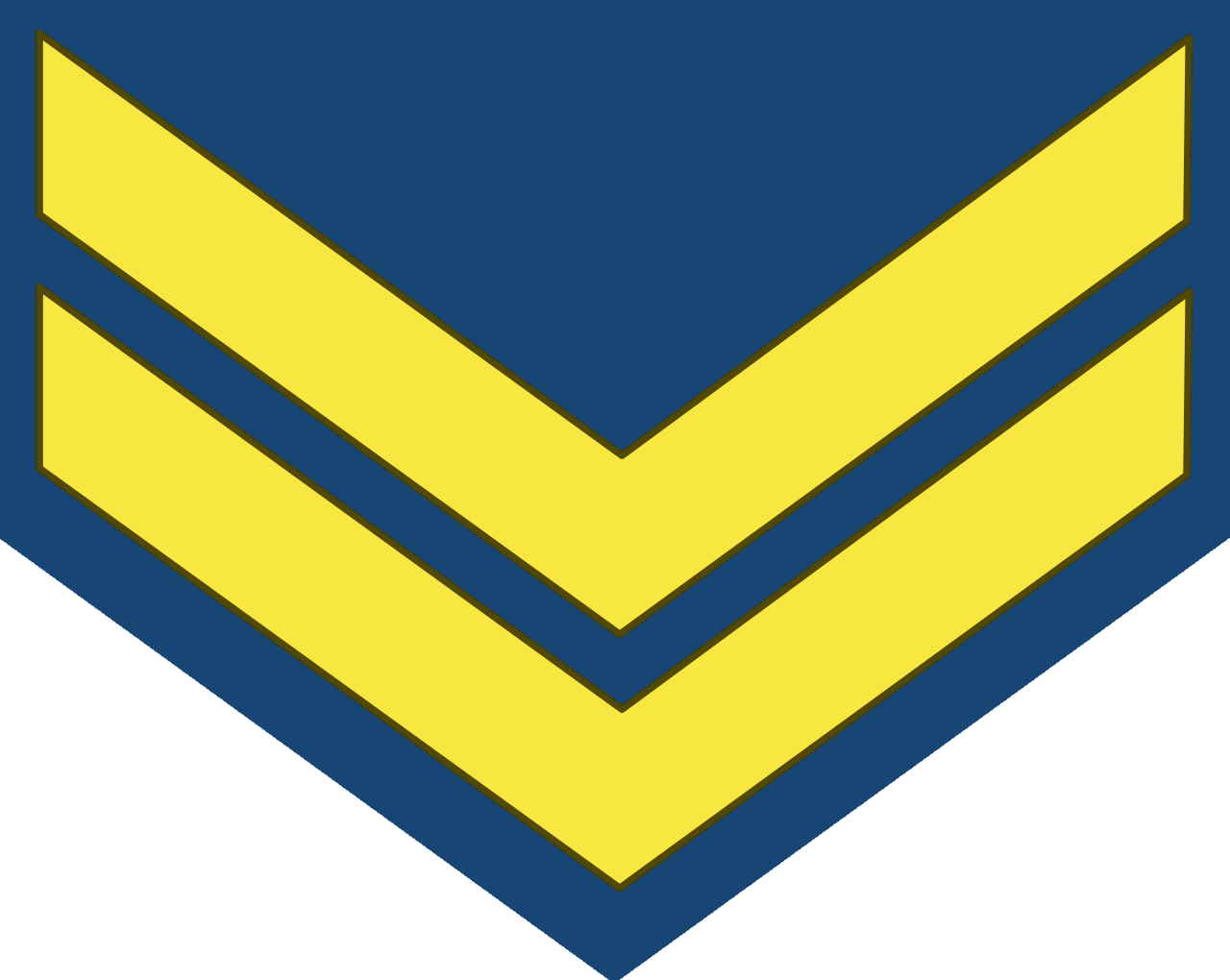
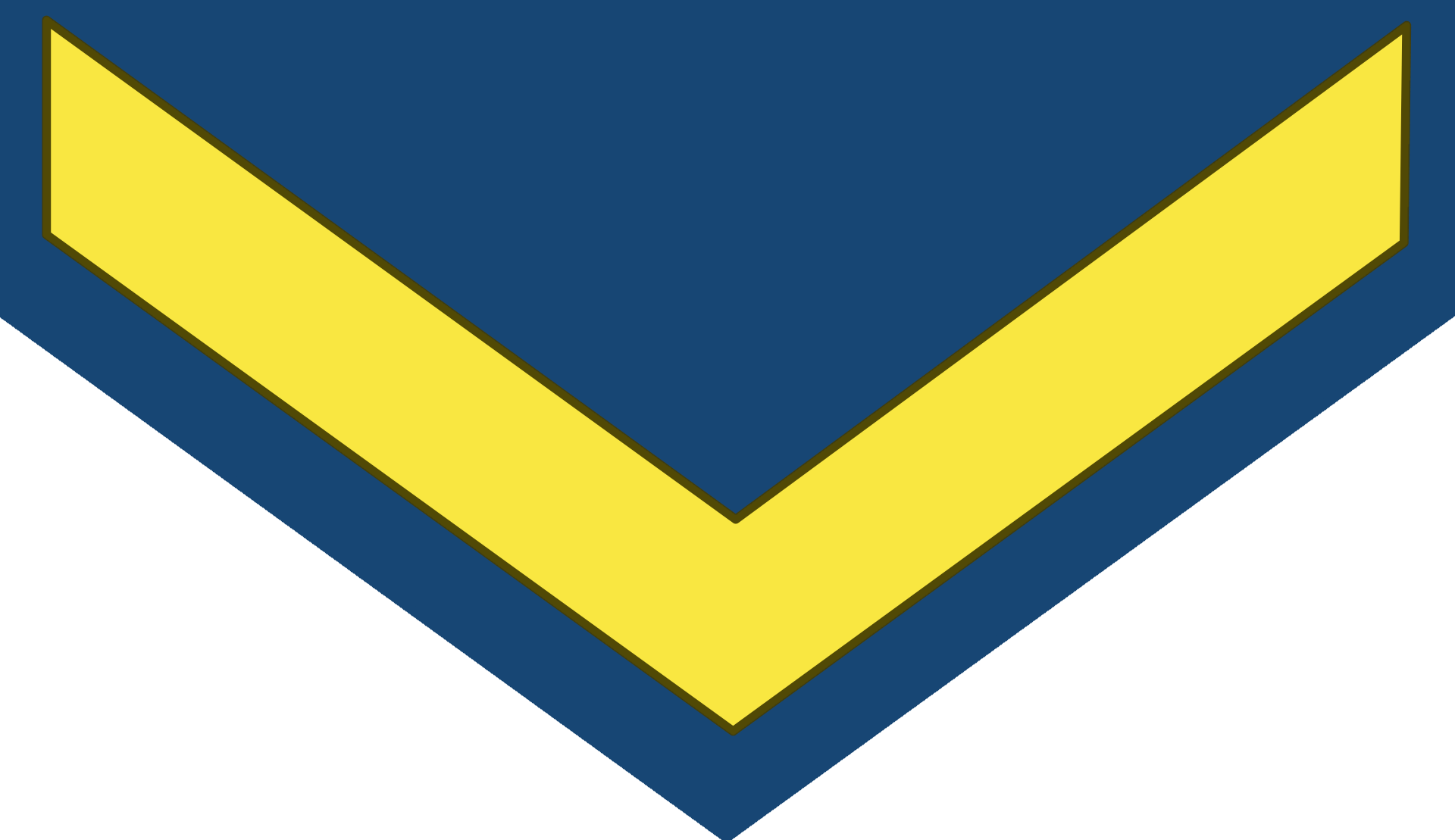
Rank group	Senior NCOs						Junior NCOs	Enlisted
Rank	مساعد أول	مساعد ثاني	مساعد	رقيب أول	رقيب ثاني	رقيب	عريف	جندي أول	جندي
Romanization	Musaeid 'awal	Musaeid thani	Musaeid	Raqib 'awal	Raqib thani	Raqīb	Earif	Jundiun 'awal	Jundiun
Syrian Arab Army (1963–2024)									No insignia
Syrian Arab Navy (1963–2024)									No insignia
Syrian Arab Air Force (1963–2024)									No insignia
